= Preus =

Preus is a surname of Norwegian origin and may refer to:

== People ==
- Anne Grete Preus (1957–2019), Norwegian singer
- Christian Keyser Preus (1852–1921), American Lutheran clergyman who served as the second president of Luther College
- David W. Preus (1922–2021), last head of the American Lutheran Church
- Herman Amberg Preus (1825–1894), Norwegian-American Lutheran clergyman and key figure in organizing the Norwegian Synod
- J. A. O. Preus (1883–1961), American politician and Governor of Minnesota
- J. A. O. Preus II (1920–1994), president of the Lutheran Church–Missouri Synod
- J. A. O. Preus III (1953–2022), American university administrator and president of Concordia University, Irvine
- Leif Preus (1928–2013), Norwegian photographer
- Margi Preus, American children's writer
- Ove J. H. Preus (1880–1951), American academic, president of Luther College (1932–1948)
- Robert Preus (1924–1995), American Lutheran pastor, professor, author, and seminary president

== Other ==
- Preus Museum, national museum for photography in Horten, Norway
- Preus, a DC Comics character

== See also ==
- Preuss
