= List of Norwegian Americans =

This is a list of notable Norwegian Americans, including both original immigrants who obtained American citizenship and their American descendants.

The list is ordered by category of human endeavour. Persons with significant contributions in two fields are listed in both of the pertinent categories, to facilitate easy lookup.

To be included in this list, the person must have a Wikipedia article showing they are Norwegian American or must have references showing they are Norwegian American and are notable.

== List ==
=== Academics ===
- Harold Leroy Enarson - (1919-2006) president of Cleveland State University and Ohio State University
- Burton Hatlen – (1936–2008) American literary scholar and professor at the University of Maine
- C. R. Hagen – professor of particle physics at the University of Rochester
- Hans-Jørgen Holman – (1925–1986) Norwegian-American musicologist and educationalist
- Robert Haugen – (1942–2013) financial economist and pioneer in the field of quantitative investing
- Lloyd Hustvedt – (1922–2004) Norwegian-born American professor and scholar of history
- Jakob Larsen – (1888–1974) American classical scholar
- David T. Lykken – (1928–2006) behavioral geneticist and professor emeritus of Psychology and Psychiatry at the University of Minnesota
- Paul Nystrom – (1878–1969) professor of marketing at Columbia University
- Carleton Opgaard – (1929–2014) American college and university administrator and founding president of Vancouver Island University
- Reidar Fauske Sognnaes – (1911–1984) Dean of the Harvard School of Dental Medicine, founding Dean of the UCLA School of Dentistry and world-renowned scholar in the field of oral pathology

==== Historians, sociologists and anthropologists ====
- Kenneth O. Bjork – (1909–1991) American professor, historian and author
- Carl Blegen – (1887–1971) American archaeologist famous for his work on the site of Pylos in modern-day Greece and Troy in modern-day Turkey.
- Theodore C. Blegen – (1891–1969) American historian and author
- Elise M. Boulding – (1920–2010) Quaker sociologist Norwegian, and author credited as a major contributor to creating the academic discipline of Peace and Conflict Studies
- Odd S. Lovoll – American author, historian and educator
- Peter A. Munch – (1908–1984) Norwegian-American sociologist, educator and author
- Carlton C. Qualey – (1904–1988) American professor, author and historian
- Gary O. Rollefson – American anthropologist
- Rick Steves – American author, historian
- Martin Ulvestad – (1865–1942) American historian and author whose writings focused on Norwegian-American immigration
- Thorstein Veblen – (1857–1929) American economist and sociologist

=== Architects ===
- Gene Amdahl – Norwegian-born computer architect and hi-tech entrepreneur
- George Awsumb – Norwegian-born, prominent American architect of 20th century
- George Bergstrom – American architect most noted for his design work on the Pentagon in Arlington County, Virginia.
- Frederick William Cappelen – (1857–1921) Norwegian-born architect and civil engineer who held the office of Minneapolis City Engineer
- George Dahl – (1894–1987) prominent American architect of 20th century.
- Joachim Goschen Giæver – (1856–1925) Civil engineer involved in the construction of the framework to Statue of Liberty
- Jon Jerde – American architect
- Peter Johnsen
- Henry Orth – (1866–1946) American architect

=== Entertainment ===
==== Actors and actresses ====
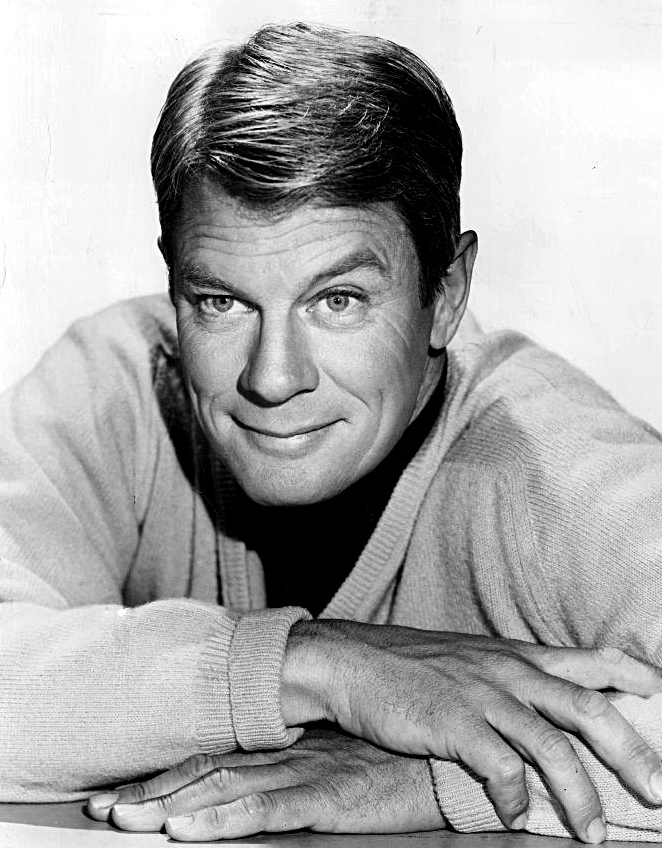
Peter Graves

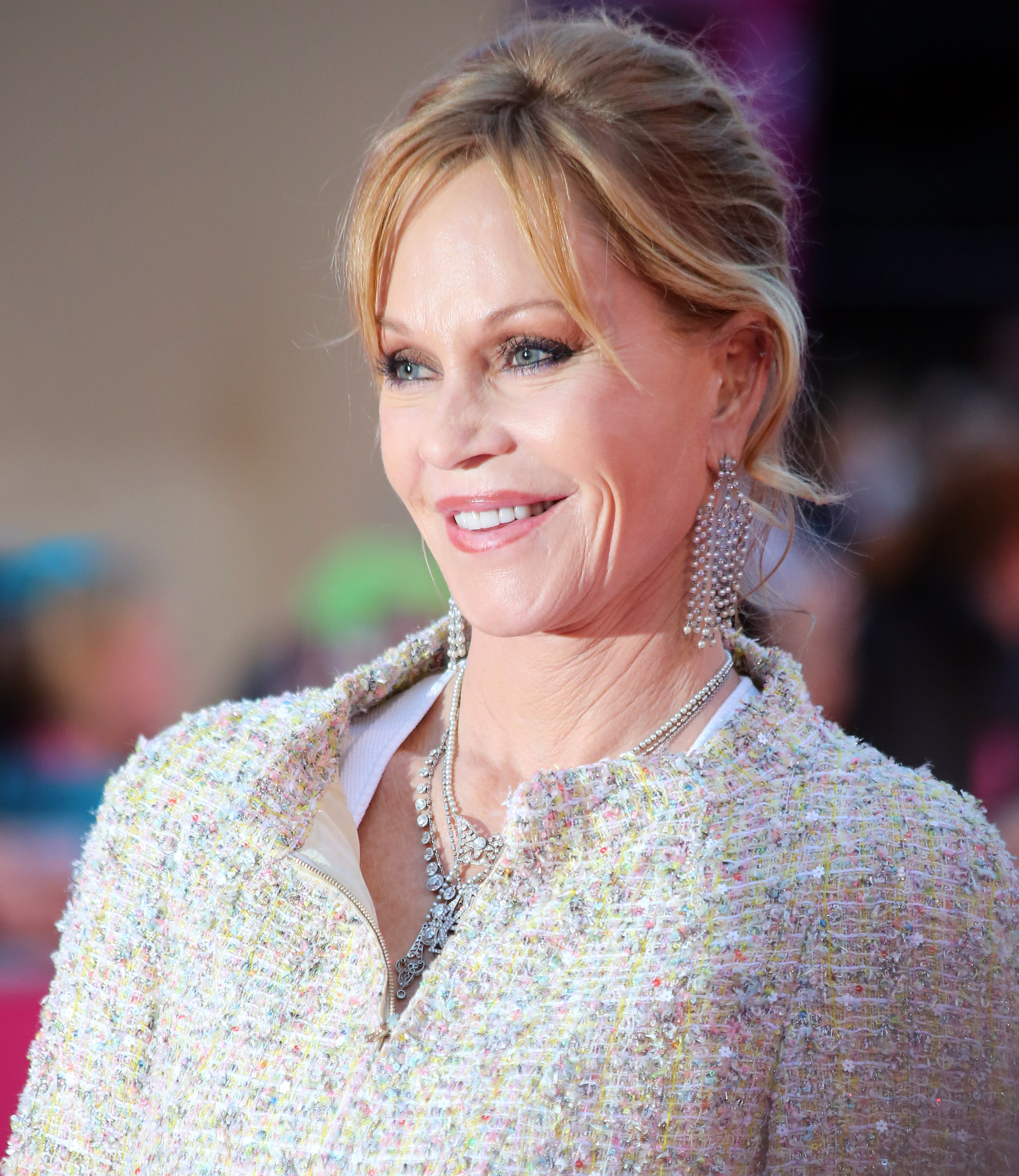
Melanie Griffith

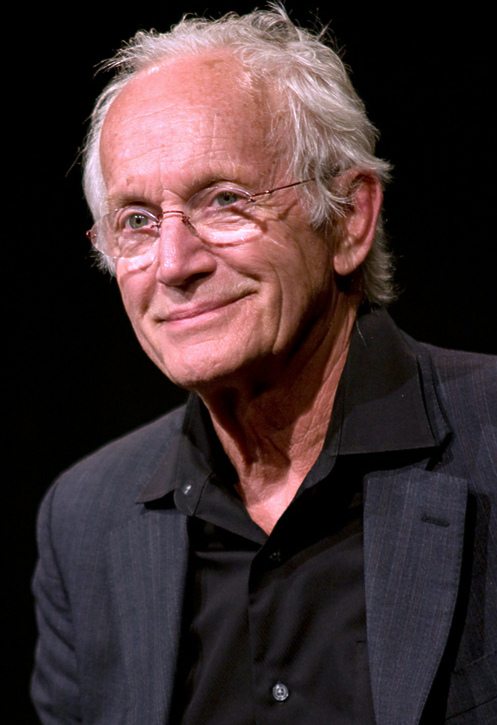
Lance Henriksen

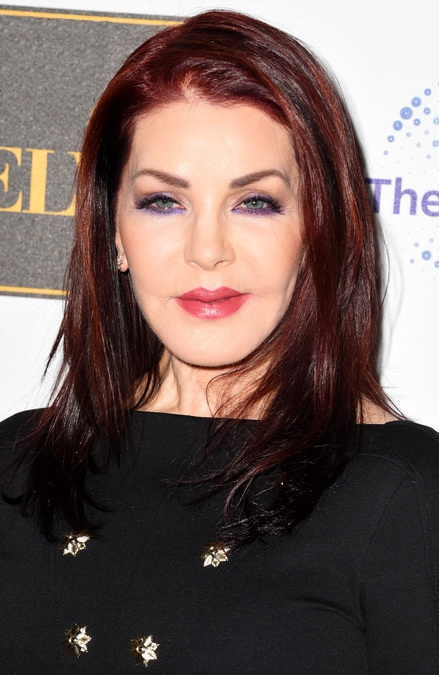
Priscilla Presley

- John Aasen – (1890–1938) American silent film actor, one of the tallest actors in history
- Jean Arthur – (1900–1991) American actress and a major film star of the 1930s and 1940s
- Nina Arvesen – American actress of Norwegian extraction, best known for her performances on American soap operas
- Richard Dean Anderson – American television and film actor, producer and composer
- James Arness – (1923–2011) American actor, best known for portraying Marshal Matt Dillon in the television series Gunsmoke, of part Norwegian descent and was brother of actor Peter Graves
- Dorothy Arnold – (1917–1997) American film actress
- Roger Awsumb – (1928–2002) American television host "Casey Jones" for the Lunch with Casey children's show.
- Earl W. Bascom – (1906–1995) cowboy actor, worked with Roy Rogers, grandmother was Norwegian
- Rowan Blanchard – American actress
- Alisha Boe – Norwegian-born actress, Norwegian mother and Somalian father. She is known for playing Jessica Davis in the Netflix drama series 13 Reasons Why.
- Stan Boreson – "King of Scandinavian Humor"
- James Cagney – (1899–1986) American actor, first on stage, then in film, grandfather was of Norwegian descent
- Dana Carvey – American comedian, actor and producer, 7/16ths Norwegian
- Jennifer Connelly – American film actress, father is of Irish and Norwegian, mother was of Ashkenazi Jewish descent
- Erika Christensen – American actress, father is of part Norwegian descent
- Lauren Cohan – American actress
- Arlene Dahl – American actress and former MGM contract star, mother of actor Lorenzo Lamas
- Laura Dern – American actress
- Tom Drake – (1918–1982) American actor
- Josh Duhamel – American actor and former fashion model, of part Norwegian descent
- Linda Eder – American singer and actress
- Dana Elcar – (1927–2005) American television and movie character actor
- Linda Evans – American actress
- Jimmy Fallon – American television host, comedian, actor, singer, writer, and producer (Norwegian maternal great-grandfather)
- Bob Fosse – (1927–1987) American actor, dancer, musical theater choreographer, director, screenwriter, film editor and film director
- Kristine Froseth – American actress and model of full Norwegian descent
- Peter Graves (actor) – (1926–2010) American film and television actor, of part Norwegian descent
- Sigrid Gurie – (1911–1969) Norwegian-born motion picture actress from the late 1930s to early 1940s
- Carmine Giovinazzo – American actor and singer, best known for his role as Detective Danny Messer in CSI: NY. He is of Norwegian and Italian descent
- Melanie Griffith – American actress, mother is of part Norwegian descent
- Josh Hartnett – American actor
- June Havoc – (1912–2010) Canadian-born American actress, dancer, writer, and theater director
- Tricia Helfer – Canadian American actress
- Lance Henriksen – American actor and artist, Norwegian father
- Celeste Holm – (1917–2012) American stage, film, and television actress
- Jon-Erik Hexum – (1957–1984) American model and actor
- Dakota Johnson - American actress of Norwegian descent
- Jean Kasem – actress and widow of Casey Kasem
- Joey King – American actress
- Marta Kristen – American actress
- Lorenzo Lamas – American actor and reality television participant, mother of Norwegian descent
- Carole Landis – (1919–1948) American film and stage actress
- Gypsy Rose Lee – (1914–1970) American burlesque entertainer, famous for her striptease act
- Lucille Lund – (1913–2002) American film actress of the 1930s.
- Dawn Lyn – American actress best known for her role in three seasons of the comedy My Three Sons
- Kristanna Loken – American actress known for her work in both film and television, and as a fashion model, is of half Norwegian and half German descent
- John Lund – (1911–1992) American film actor who is probably best remembered for his role in the film A Foreign Affair
- Jena Malone – actress, of part Norwegian descent
- Kimberly Matula – actress best known for her role as Hope Logan on CBS’s The Bold and the Beautiful
- Peter MacNicol – American actor (Ally McBeal)
- Jenny Maxwell – (1941–1981) American film and television actress, probably best remembered for her role in the 1961 Elvis Presley film Blue Hawaii
- Robert Mitchum – (1917–1997) American film actor, author, composer and singer, of half Norwegian descent
- Christopher Mitchum – American actor. He is the second son of film star Robert Mitchum and younger brother of actor James Mitchum, father was of half Norwegian descent
- James Mitchum – American actor and son of Robert Mitchum, father was of half Norwegian descent
- Marilyn Monroe – (1926–1962) American actress, singer and model, of part Norwegian descent
- Harry Morgan – (1915–2011) American actor
- Patricia Morison – American stage and motion picture actress and mezzo-soprano singer
- Kari Michaelsen – American actress. She is most known by her role as Katie Kanisky on the television sitcom Gimme a Break!
- Mildred Natwick – (1905–1994) American stage and film actress
- Barry Nelson – (1917–2007) American actor (James Bond)
- Nathan Fillion – actor
- Greta Nissen – (1906–1988) Norwegian-born American film and stage actress.
- Dagmar Oakland – (1893–1989) American actress
- Eric Christian Olsen – American actor known for his role in NCIS: Los Angeles, 100% Norwegian
- Ashley Olsen – actress, producer, fashion designer and businesswoman. Is the twin sister of Mary-Kate Olsen and elder sister of Elizabeth Olsen
- Mary-Kate Olsen – actress, producer, fashion designer and businesswoman. Is the twin sister of Ashley Olsen and elder sister of Elizabeth Olsen
- Elizabeth Olsen – actress, younger sister of twins Mary-Kate and Ashley Olsen
- Barbara Payton – American fashion model and actress, parents of Norwegian descent
- Piper Perabo – American stage, film and television actress, mother is of Norwegian descent
- Chris Pratt – American Actor of English, German, Swiss-German, French-Canadian and Norwegian descent
- Priscilla Presley – American actress and businesswoman and ex-wife of musician Elvis Presley, of part Norwegian descent
- John Qualen – (1899–1987) Canadian-American character actor of Norwegian heritage who specialized in Scandinavian roles
- Evan Ross – American actor and musician, father was Norwegian
- Peter MacNicol - American Actor, part of Norwegian descent
- Kathryn Leigh Scott – American television and film actress
- Kevin Sorbo – American actor (Hercules: The Legendary Journeys), of part Norwegian descent
- Ann Reinking – American actress, dancer, and choreographer
- Sonia Satra – American actress
- David Soul – American-British actor and singer, best known for his role as Detective Kenneth "Hutch" Hutchinson in the television programme Starsky and Hutch
- Sally Struthers – American actress and spokeswoman (Gloria Stivic on All in the Family and as Babette on Gilmore Girls)
- Harry Tenbrook – Norwegian-American actor
- Max Thieriot – American actor
- Sophie Thatcher – American actress
- Justin Torkildsen – American actor, best known for his role on The Bold and the Beautiful
- Aaron Tveit – theatre, television, and film actor
- Kirsten Vangsness – American actress (Criminal Minds)
- Shantel VanSanten – American actress
- Vicky Vette – pornographic actress and model
- Robert Wagner – American actor best known for the Hart to Hart TV series
- Kristen Wiig – American film and television actress, paternal grandfather was of Norwegian descent
- Michelle Williams – American film and television actress, of part Norwegian descent
- Rainn Wilson – American actor
- Renée Zellweger – American actress and producer, mother is Norwegian-born, and of part Norwegian descent

==== Screenwriters, directors and producers of film ====
- John G. Avildsen – American film director
- Janae Bakken – American television producer and screenwriter best known for her work on the television series Scrubs
- Kathryn Bigelow – American director
- Ron Hauge – American television writer
- Brian Helgeland – American screenwriter, film producer and director
- Richard Christian Matheson – novelist, screenwriter and producer
- Richard Matheson (1926–2013) – American author and screenwriter
- Sarah Cameron Sunde – American theatrical director

==== Singers and musicians ====
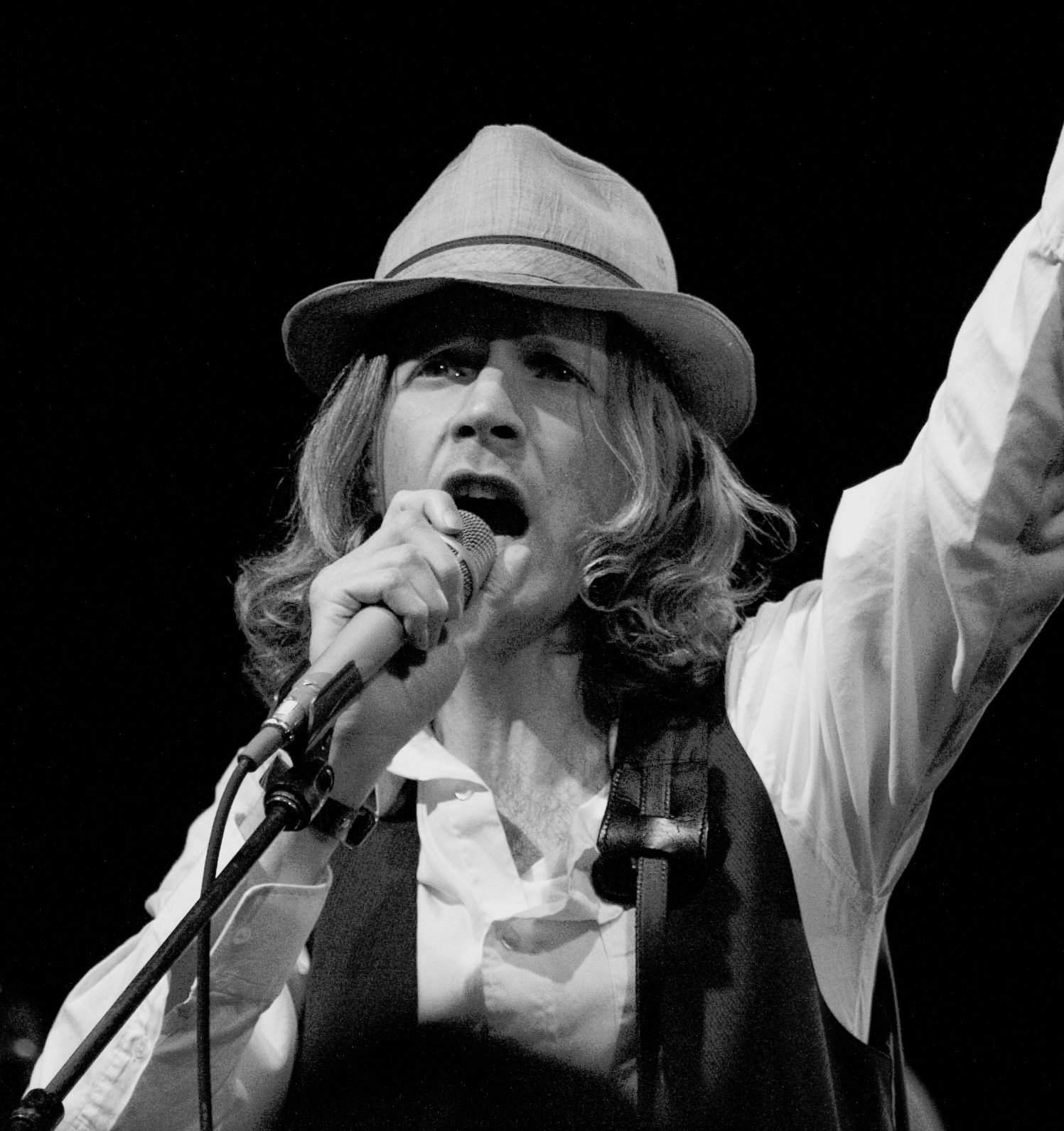
Beck

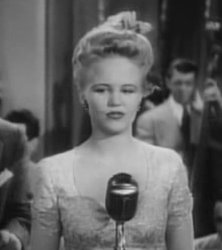
Peggy Lee

- Liz Anderson – American country music singer
- Lynn Andersen – American country music singer and equestrian
- The Andrews Sisters
- Peter Askim – American composer of modern classical music
- Sophie Auster – American singer and actress
- Chet Baker – (1929–1988) American jazz trumpeter, flugelhornist and singer.
- Beck – American musician, singer-songwriter and multi-instrumentalist
- Stan Boreson – the "King of Scandinavian Humor"
- Jackson Browne – American rock singer-songwriter and musician
- Storm Bull – (1913–2007) American musician, composer and educator
- Jerry Cantrell – American musician, lead guitarist of Alice in Chains
- F. Melius Christiansen – (1871–1955) Norwegian-born violinist and choral conductor in the Lutheran choral tradition
- Paul J. Christiansen – (1914–1997) American choral conductor and composer
- David Ellefson – bassist and founding member of the American band Megadeth
- Bradley Ellingboe – American choral composer and conductor
- Myron Floren – (1919–2005) American musician best known as the accordionist on The Lawrence Welk Show
- Leif Garrett – American singer and actor
- Josh Groban – American singer-songwriter (great-grandmother of Norwegian descent)
- Marty Haugen – American composer of liturgical music
- Skitch Henderson – (1918–2005) pianist, conductor, and composer
- Bibbe Hansen – artist, musician, and former actress best known as the mother of musician Beck
- Adolph Herseth – principal trumpet in the Chicago Symphony Orchestra from 1948 until 2001
- Nick Hexum – American musician, currently the vocalist and guitarist for the 311 band
- Josh Homme – American rock musician and record producer
- David Johansen – American rock, protopunk, blues, and pop singer, as well as a songwriter and actor
- Terry Kath – (1946–1978) American guitarist and singer, and former member of the jazz rock band Chicago
- Ardis Krainik – (1929–1997) American mezzo-soprano opera singer
- Adam Lambert – American singer
- Okay Kaya – American singer
- Peggy Lee – (1920–2002) American jazz and popular music singer-songwriter, composer, and actress
- DJ Muggs – Cypress Hill's DJ and producer
- Brent Mydland – (1952–1990) fourth keyboardist to play for the American rock band the Grateful Dead
- Joni Mitchell – Canadian musician, songwriter, and painter that resident in New York
- Spencer Nilsen – video game music composer
- Renee Olstead – American actress and singer
- Malia Ann Kawailanamalie Petersen – Hula Halau 'O Kamuela dancer
- Robin Pecknold – songwriter, lead singer of American indie folk band Fleet Foxes
- Lisa Marie Presley – singer-songwriter and daughter of Elvis Presley
- Iggy Pop – American singer-songwriter, musician, and occasional actor
- Gregg Rolie – American keyboardist, organist, and singer, who is one of the founding members of the bands Santana, The Storm, Abraxas Pool and Journey, for whom he was the original lead singer.
- Alia Shawkat – American actress (Arrested Development)
- Grace Slick – American singer-ongwriter, one of the lead singers of the rock groups The Great Society, Jefferson Airplane, Jefferson Starship, and Starship
- Matt Sorum – American rock drummer and percussionist. He works with Guns N' Roses and Velvet Revolver
- Gwen Stefani – American singer-songwriter, fashion designer and occasional actress. (maternal second great-grandmother parents)
- Harry Stewart – (1908–1956) American comedian and singer
- Axel Stordahl – (1913–1963) arranger active from the late 1930s through the 1950s
- Carl Frederick Tandberg – (1910–1988) bass fiddle musician (Glen Campbell)
- Tinashe – singer
- Peter Tork – American musician and actor, best known as a member of The Monkees
- Eddie Vedder – best known as the lead vocalist of the American rock band Pearl Jam; Vedder was born Edward Louis Severson III
- Paul Waaktaar-Savoy – lyricist, singer, and guitar player from the band a-ha and Savoy. He was born in Oslo and moved to New York after meeting his girlfriend (now wife), Lauren Savoy.
- Tom Waits – American singer-songwriter, composer, and actor
- Camilla Wicks – American violinist and one of the first female violinists to establish a major international career
- Okay Kaya – American singer-songwriter, model, and actor. Most known as OKAY KAYA, her stage name
- Vera Zorina – (1917–2003) Norwegian ballerina, musical theatre actress and choreographer

==== Models ====
- Lauren Anderson
- Brooke Berry
- Jo Collins – Playboy Magazine's Playmate of the Month
- CariDee English – American fashion model and TV personality
- Patti Hansen – American model and actress
- Nicky Hilton – American fashion model, socialite, celebutante, and fashion designer
- Dakota Johnson – American fashion model and actress, daughter of actors Don Johnson and Melanie Griffith
- Surrey Marshe
- Leeann Tweeden – American model
- Nikki Ziering – American model and actress
- Christine Teigen – American model
- Lindsay Ellingson – American model

==== Sport ====
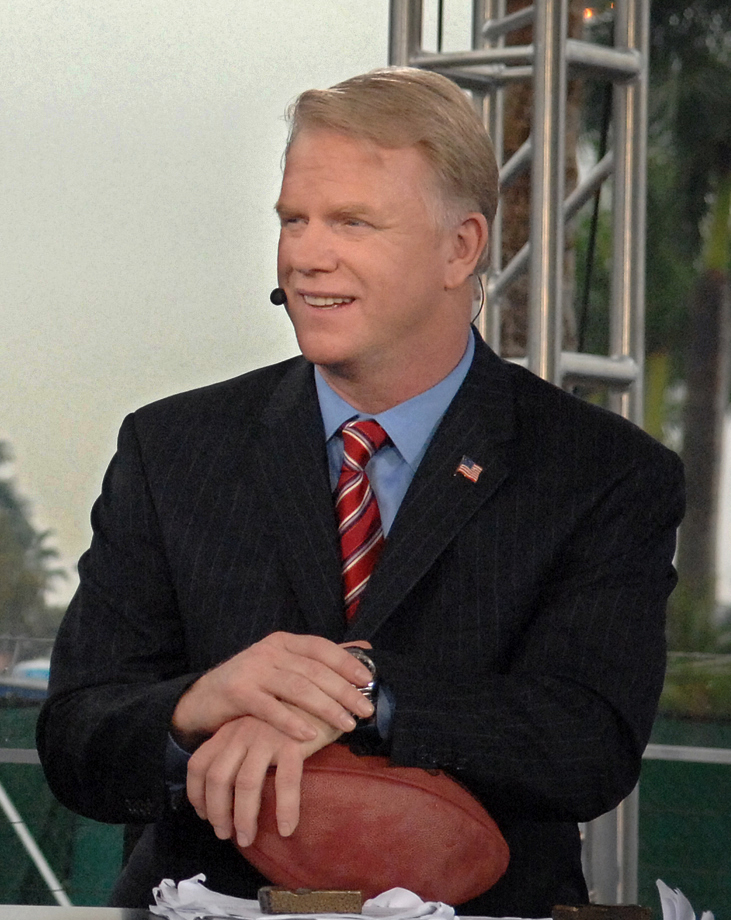
Boomer Esiason

- Lance Armstrong – American former professional road racing cyclist
- Gil Andersen (1879–1930) – American auto racer active during the formative years of motorsport
- Craig Anderson – American NHL goaltender
- John Anderson (1873–1949) – Major League Baseball outfielder and first baseman
- Lisa Aukland (born 1957) – professional bodybuilder and powerlifter
- Espen Baardsen – former footballer
- Jim Bakken – former American football punter and placekicker
- Jill Bakken – American Olympic bobsledder
- Ole Bardahl
- Earl W. Bascom (1906–1995) – hall of fame rodeo champion, "Father of Modern Rodeo"
- Tom Brady – American NFL quarterback for the New England Patriots and Tampa Bay Buccaneers
- Walter Burkemo – American professional golfer
- Dustin Byfuglien – American NHL defenseman
- George Dahlgren (1887–1940) – player in the National Football League
- Mix Diskerud – Norwegian-born American soccer player currently playing for MLS club New York City FC
- Grete Eliassen – American freestyle skier; Norwegian father
- Audun Endestad – Norwegian-born American cross-country skier, author, and field guide
- Alf Engen (1909–1997) – Norwegian-born skier and skiing school owner/teacher; set several ski jumping world records in the 1930s
- Corey Engen (1916–2006) – captain of the U.S. Nordic ski team at the 1948 Winter Olympics in St. Moritz, Switzerland
- Sverre Engen (1911–2001) – Norwegian-born skier, ski coach, ski area manager, and filmmaker
- Hal Erickson (1898–1963) – player in the National Football League
- Stein Eriksen – former alpine ski racer and Olympic gold medalist
- Gretchen Fraser (1919–1994) – Alpine ski racer, the first American to win an Olympic gold medal for skiing
- Sig Haugdahl (1891–1970) – IMCA champion 1927–1932 and an early promoter of stock car racing in the United States
- Anders Haugen (1888–1984) – American ski jumper
- Greg Haugen – retired American boxer
- Michael Haugen Jr. – professional ten-pin bowler
- Art Hauger (1893–1944) – Major League Baseball player
- Sonja Henie (1912–1969) – Norwegian figure skater and film star
- Hjalmar Hvam (1902–1996) – competitive Norwegian-American Nordic skier and inventor of the first safety ski binding
- Burt Ingwersen (1898–1969) – American football, basketball, and baseball player
- Kenneth Di Vita Jensen – Norwegian-born American soccer player
- Si Johnson (1906–1994) – pitcher for the Cincinnati Reds
- Lolo Jones – American track and field athlete who specialized in the 60 and 100-meter hurdles
- Arndt Jorgens (1905–1980) – catcher in Major League Baseball
- Sonny Jurgensen – former American football quarterback in the National Football League
- Brandon Inge – American professional baseball infielder
- Jay Kleven (1949–2009) – Major League Baseball player in 1976 for the New York Mets
- Don Larsen (1929–2020) – American Major League Baseball pitcher who threw a perfect game in the 1956 World Series
- Newt Loken – former artistic gymnast and coach of gymnastics, trampolining, and cheerleading
- Harold "Hal" W. Moe (1910–2001) – American college football player and assistant coach
- Tommy Moe – former alpine ski racer
- Doug Moe – American professional basketball coach
- Sondre Norheim (1825–1897) – Norwegian skier and pioneer of modern skiing
- Werner Nilsen (1904–1992) – Norwegian-American soccer forward
- Casper Oimoen (1906–1995) – American ski jumping champion
- John Olerud – American former first baseman in Major League Baseball
- Ole Olsen (1894–1980) – Major League Baseball pitcher
- Greg Olson – American football coach
- Lute Olson – retired American men's basketball coach
- Peter Oppegard – American retired pair skater and coach
- Danica Patrick – American auto racing driver, model, and advertising spokeswoman
- Sarah Reinertsen – American athlete
- Earl Sande (1898–1968) – American Hall of Fame jockey and thoroughbred horse trainer
- Eddie August Schneider (1911–1940) – set three transcontinental airspeed records for pilots under the age of twenty-one in 1930
- Knute Rockne (1888–1931) – American football coach
- Ed Saugestad – former college men's ice hockey coach
- Bjørn Selander – American racing cyclist
- Jack Skille – American professional ice hockey player for the Florida Panthers of the National Hockey League
- Karsten Solheim (1911–2000) – Norwegian-born American golf club designer and businessman
- Carl Tellefsen (1854–1908) – Norwegian-born skiing champion and the first leader of the U.S. Ski and Snowboard Association
- Jimmy "Big Jim" Wiggs (1876–1963) – pitcher in Major League Baseball
- Jan Stenerud – former professional football player for the American Football League's Kansas City Chiefs
- Snowshoe Thompson (1827–1876) – considered the father of California skiing
- Arthur E. Tokle (1922–2005) – Norwegian-born American ski jumper
- Torger Tokle (1919–1945) – Norwegian-born ski jumper; the Torger Tokle Memorial Trophy was created in his honor after he was killed while serving as a ski trooper in World War II
- Cory Undlin - American football coach
- Paige VanZant – American mixed martial artist
- Lindsey Vonn – American alpine skier
- Johnny Weir – American figure skater
- Babe Didrikson Zaharias (1911–1956) – American athlete who achieved outstanding success in golf, basketball, and track and field
- Brede Hangeland
- Bjørn Maars Johnsen

=== Bankers ===
- Arthur E. Andersen – (1885–1947) founder of the accounting firm Arthur Andersen LLP.
- Richard W. Fisher – President and CEO of the Federal Reserve Bank of Dallas
- Helge Alexander Haugan – (1847–1909) American banking executive in Chicago, Illinois.
- Gabriel Hauge – (1914–1981) prominent American bank executive and economist.
- John Paulson – (born 1955) President and founder of Paulson & Co.
- John Westergaard – (1931–2003) stock analyst and founder of the Westergaard Fund, also political advisor to Senator Daniel Patrick Moynihan

=== Business ===
- Linda Avey – founder of 23andMe, the consumer genetics company
- Simon Benson – (1852–1942) noted businessman and philanthropist
- Alden W. Clausen – former President of the World Bank
- William Copeland (brewer), Copeland was born Johan Martinius Thoresen in Arendal in Norway before he moved to USA. He set up a brewery in Japan which today is known as Kirin Beer.
- Ralph Evinrude – (1907–1986) American business magnate best known for being the Chairman of Outboard Marine Corporation
- H. P. Faye – (1859–1928) Norwegian-born businessman who developed sugar cane plantations on west Kauaʻi
- Gary Haugen – President and CEO of International Justice Mission
- H. G. Haugan – Norwegian-born, American railroad's executive
- Barron Hilton – American socialite, hotel heir, former co-chairman of the Hilton Hotels chain
- Conrad Hilton – (1887–1979) American hotelier and founder of the Hilton Hotels chain
- Conrad Hilton, Jr. – (1926–1969) American socialite, hotel heir, businessman
- Richard Hilton – chairman and co-founder of Hilton & Hyland
- Turi Josefsen – Norwegian-born, American businesswoman
- Fred Kavli – Norwegian and naturalized American physicist, business leader, inventor, and philanthropist
- N. O. Nelson – (1844–1922) founder of the N. O. Nelson Manufacturing Company
- Kjell Qvale – Norwegian-born business executive
- Tova Traesnaes – Norwegian-born American business-woman. She is the founder of the Beauty By Tova cosmetics featured on QVC
- James Trane – (1857–1936) co-founder of Trane
- Reuben Trane – (1886–1954) founded Trane, the heating and air conditioning company, with his father James Trane

=== Cartoonists ===
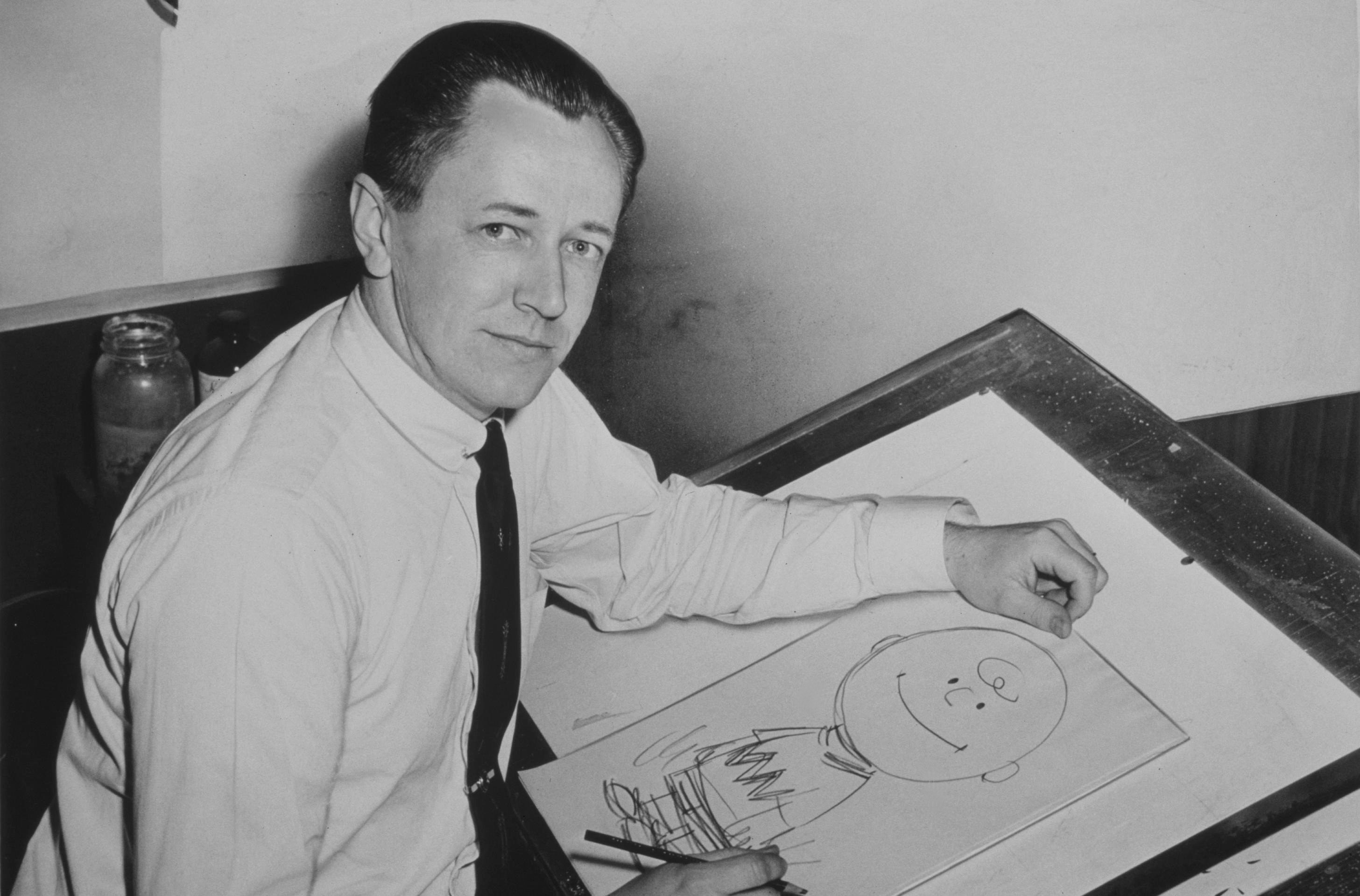
Charles Schulz

- Carl Thomas Anderson – (1865–1948) American cartoonist best remembered for his comic strip Henry.
- Matt Groening – American cartoonist, screenwriter, and producer. He is the creator of the comic strip Life in Hell as well as two successful television series, The Simpsons and Futurama.
- Grim Natwick – (1890–1990) American artist, animator and film director (Betty Boop)
- Charles M. Schulz – (1922–2000) American cartoonist, creator of comic strip Peanuts

=== Explorers and founders ===
- Carl Ben Eielson – (1897–1929) aviator, bush pilot and explorer
- Jafet Lindeberg – (1873–1962) gold prospector and co-founder of the city of Nome, Alaska
- Finn Ronne – (1899–1980) U.S. Antarctic explorer.
- Erik Ramstad – (1860–1951) one of the founders of Minot, North Dakota

=== Journalist ===
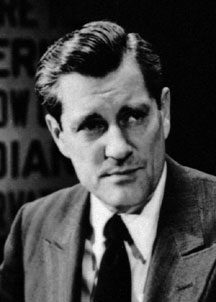
Eric Sevareid

- Waldemar Ager – (1869–1941) Norwegian-born American newspaperman and author
- Brynild Anundsen – (1844–1913) Norwegian-born American newspaper editor and publisher
- Ole Amundsen Buslett – (1855–1924) Norwegian-born American author, newspaperman, and politician
- David Cay Johnston - investigative journalist and author
- William T. Evjue – (1882–1970) American newspaper editor and radio broadcast executive.
- Hans Andersen Foss – (1851–1929) American author, newspaper editor and temperance leader
- Tavi Gevinson – American fashion journalist and blogger
- Gulbrand Hagen – (1864–1919) American newspaper editor, writer, photographe
- Johan Hambro – (1915–1993) Norwegian journalist, translator and biographer
- Vernon Arnold Haugland – (1908–1984) Reporter and writer for Associated Press. As a war correspondent, he documented World War II events as they occurred. He was the first civilian to receive the Silver Star medal.
- Carl Hiaasen – American journalist, columnist and novelist
- Reidar Rye Haugan – (1893–1972) American newspaper editor and publisher
- Judy Lee Klemesrud – (1939–1985) writer for The New York Times from 1966 until her death in 1985
- Victor Lawson – (1850–1925) American newspaper publisher who headed the Chicago Daily News from 1876 to 1925
- Elias Molee – (1845–1928) American journalist, philologist and linguist.
- Jane Pauley – American television journalist
- James DeNoon Reymert – (1821–1896) American newspaper editor, mine operator, lawyer and politician
- Jerry Rosholt – (1923–2008) American journalist and author
- Andreas Nilsen Rygg – (1868–1951) Norwegian-American newspaper editor and author
- Orion Samuelson – (born 1934) Norwegian-American broadcaster, host of the U.S. Farm Report
- Eric Sevareid – (1912–1992) CBS news journalist from 1939 to 1977
- Carl Søyland – (1894–1978) Norwegian-born author, reporter, editor
- Marcus Thrane – (1817–1890) Norwegian author, journalist, and the leader of the first Norwegian labor movement
- Brenda Ueland – (1891–1985) American journalist, writers and editor. Awarded the Knight of Royal Norwegian Order of St. Olav by the Norwegian government for her covering of the treason trials of Vidkun Quisling.
- Johannes B. Wist – (1864–1923) Norwegian-born newspaper editor, journalist and author

=== Lawyers ===
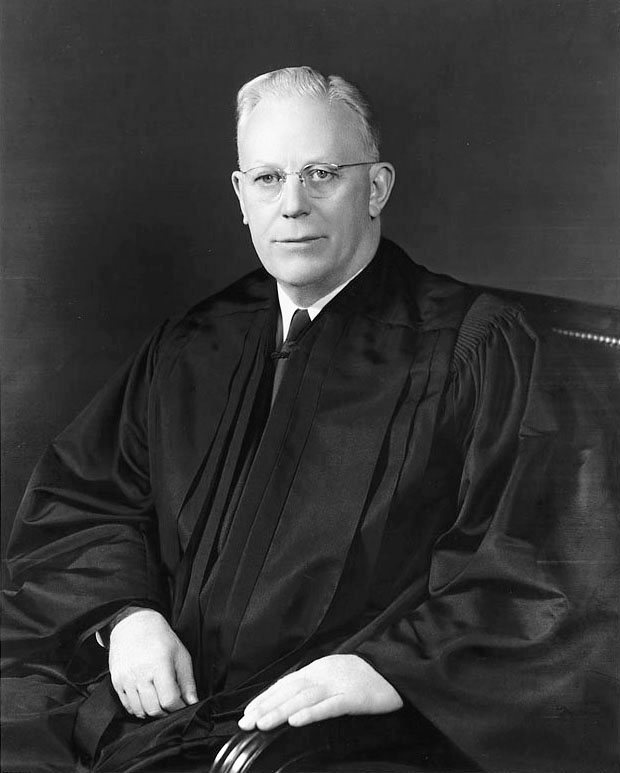
Earl Warren

- Adolph M. Christianson – (1877–1954) justice of the North Dakota Supreme Court.
- Harvey B. Knudson – (1903–1978) Justice on the North Dakota Supreme Court
- Egil Krogh – (1939–2020) American lawyer who became famous as an official of the Richard Nixon
- Arthur Larson – (1910–1993) American lawyer, law professor, United States Under Secretary of Labor from 1954 to 1956, director of the United States Information Agency from 1956 to 1957, and Executive Assistant to the President for Speeches from 1957 to 1958.
- Mary Pawlenty – former American state court judge who served on Minnesota's First Judicial District
- Aad J. Vinje – (1857–1929) justice on the Wisconsin Supreme Court
- Earl Warren – (1891–1974) 14th Chief Justice of the United States Supreme Court and one of only two people to be elected Governor of California three times

=== Meteorologists ===
- Jacob Bjerknes – (1897–1975) Norwegian-born meteorologist.
- Jørgen Holmboe – (1902–1979) Norwegian-American meteorologist.

=== Military ===
- Peter C. Assersen – (1839–1906) Norwegian-born, American civil engineer and Rear Admiral in the United States Navy
- Quentin Aanenson – (1921–2008) Captain of the 391st Fighter Squadron featured in Ken Burn's 2007 documentary The War
- Bernt Balchen – (1899–1973), winner of the Distinguished Flying Cross, Norwegian native and later U.S. citizen, known as a pioneer polar aviator, navigator, aircraft mechanical engineer and military leader
- Bowe Bergdahl – United States Army soldier of Norwegian and Swedish descent. Captured by the Taliban.
- Margarethe Cammermeyer – former colonel in the Washington National Guard and a gay rights activist
- Fred J. Christensen – (1921–2006) fighter pilot and ace with the United States Army Air Forces during World War II
- Richard Daley - Annapolis graduate and retired USMC Lieutenant Colonel. Recipient of two Silver Stars, Korea and Vietnam.
- Thomas Daley Major, USAF (1934 - 2021). Recipient of two Distinguished Flying Crosses, Vietnam.
- Gail Halvorsen – retired career officer and command pilot in the United States Air Force (The Candy Bomber)
- Louis J. Hauge, Jr. – (1924–1945) United States Marine
- Orin D. Haugen – (1907–1945) Colonel in the United States Army
- Knut Haukelid – (1911–1994) Norwegian resistance movement soldier during World War II
- Hans Christian Heg – (1829–1863) Norwegian-born abolitionist, journalist, anti-slavery activist, politician and soldier, led Scandinavian 15th Wisconsin Volunteer Regiment on Union side in American Civil War. Died of the wounds received at Battle of Chickamauga.
- Olaf M. Hustvedt – (1886–1978) United States Navy vice admiral, World War II battleship commander and twice recipient of the Legion of Merit
- Ole C. Johnson – (1838–1886) Norwegian-American soldier in the American Civil War
- Lauris Norstad – (1907–1988) American General in the United States Army Air Forces and United States Air Force
- Ralph Ofstie – (1897–1956) United States Navy vice admiral, World War II aircraft carrier commander and post war commander of the United States Sixth Fleet
- Ludwig Andreas Olsen – (1845–1886) also known as Louis Williams, United States Navy sailor
- George William Rud – (1883–1916) United States Navy Chief Machinist's Mate
- Thorvald A. Solberg – (1894–1964) United States Navy rear admiral, twice recipient of the Legion of Merit, and head of the Office of Naval Research.
- Andrew V. Stoltenberg – (1865–1921) United States Navy sailor and a recipient of the Medal of Honor for his actions in the Philippine–American War.
- Leif J. Sverdrup – (1898–1976) Norwegian-born American civil engineer and general with the U.S. Army Corps of Engineers in the first half of the 20th century.
- Jacob Thorkelson – (1876–1945) American elected official, Naval officer and medical doctor
- Leo K. Thorsness – (1932–2017) fighter pilot and a recipient of the Medal of Honor for his actions in the Vietnam War.
- Karl Westa – (1875–1949) United States Navy sailor

=== Politicians ===
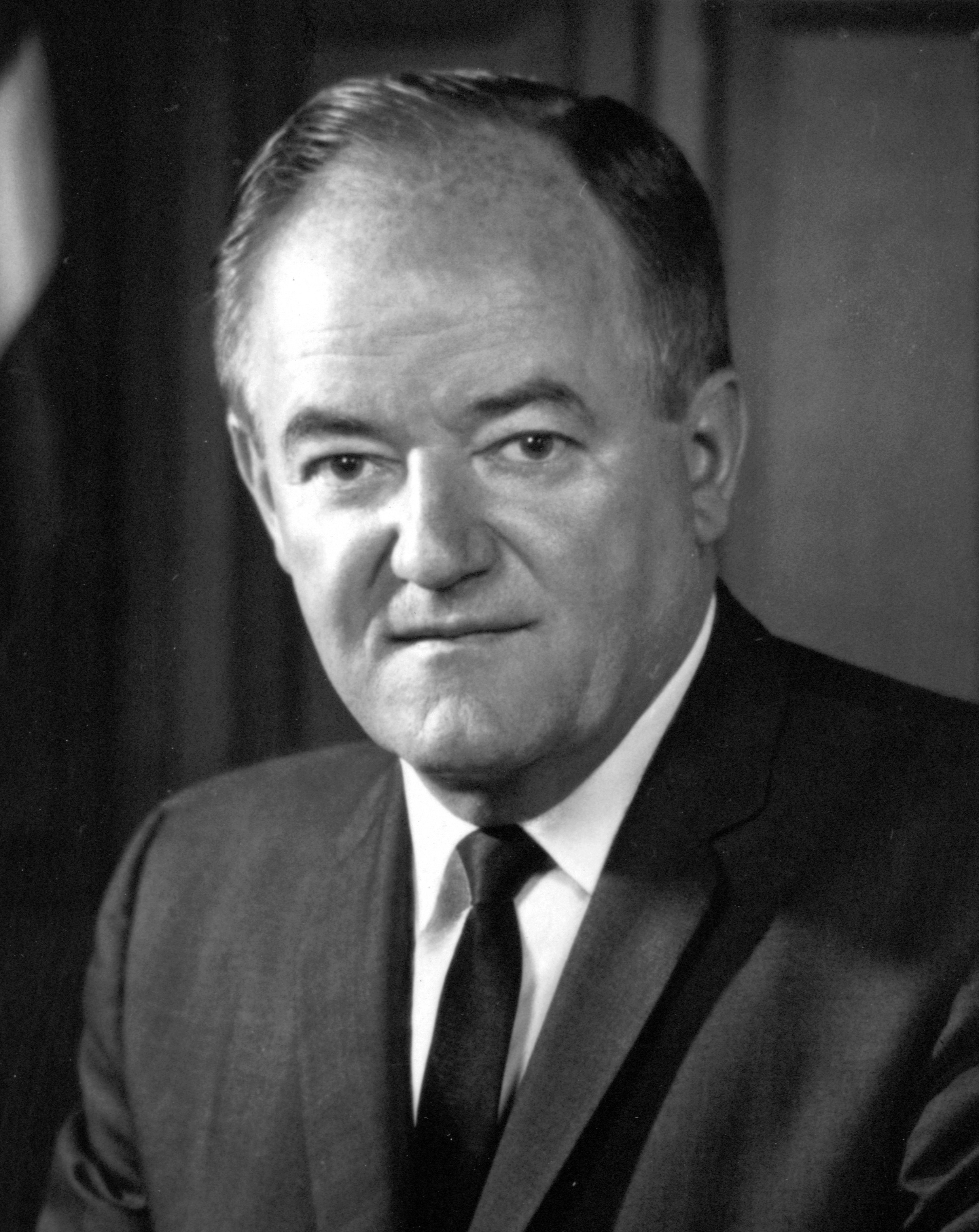
Hubert H. Humphrey

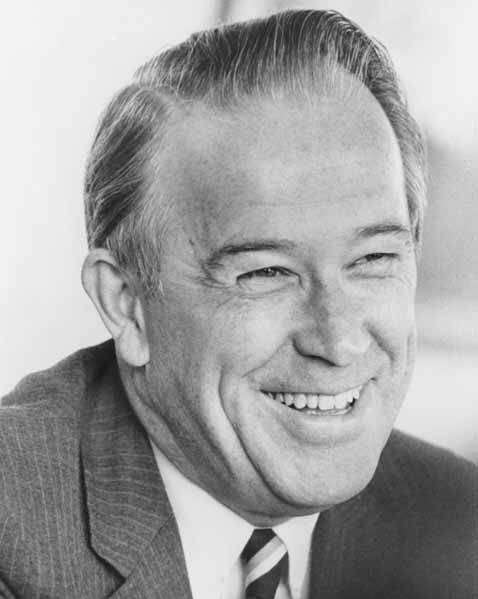
Henry M. Jackson

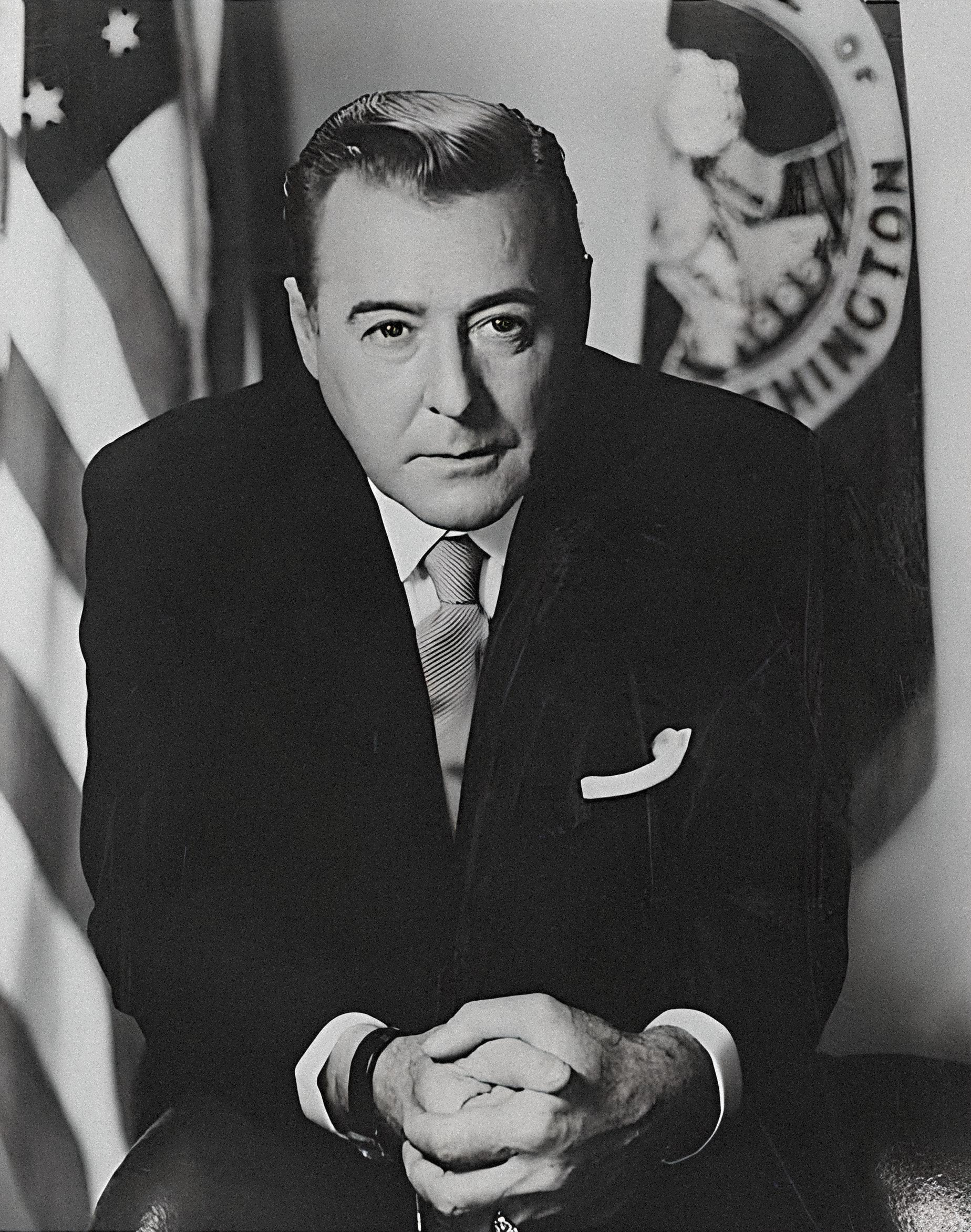
Warren G. Magnuson

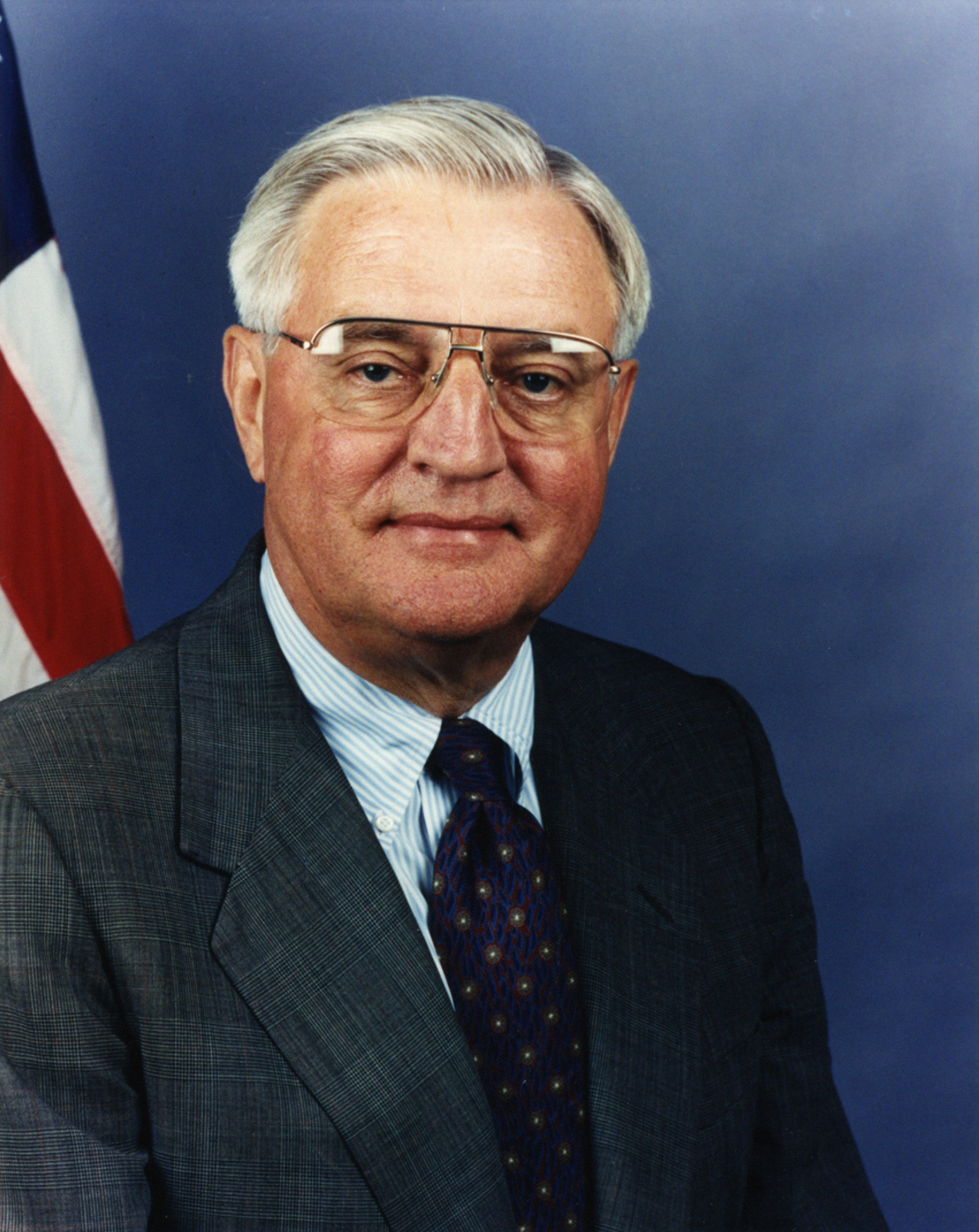
Walter Mondale

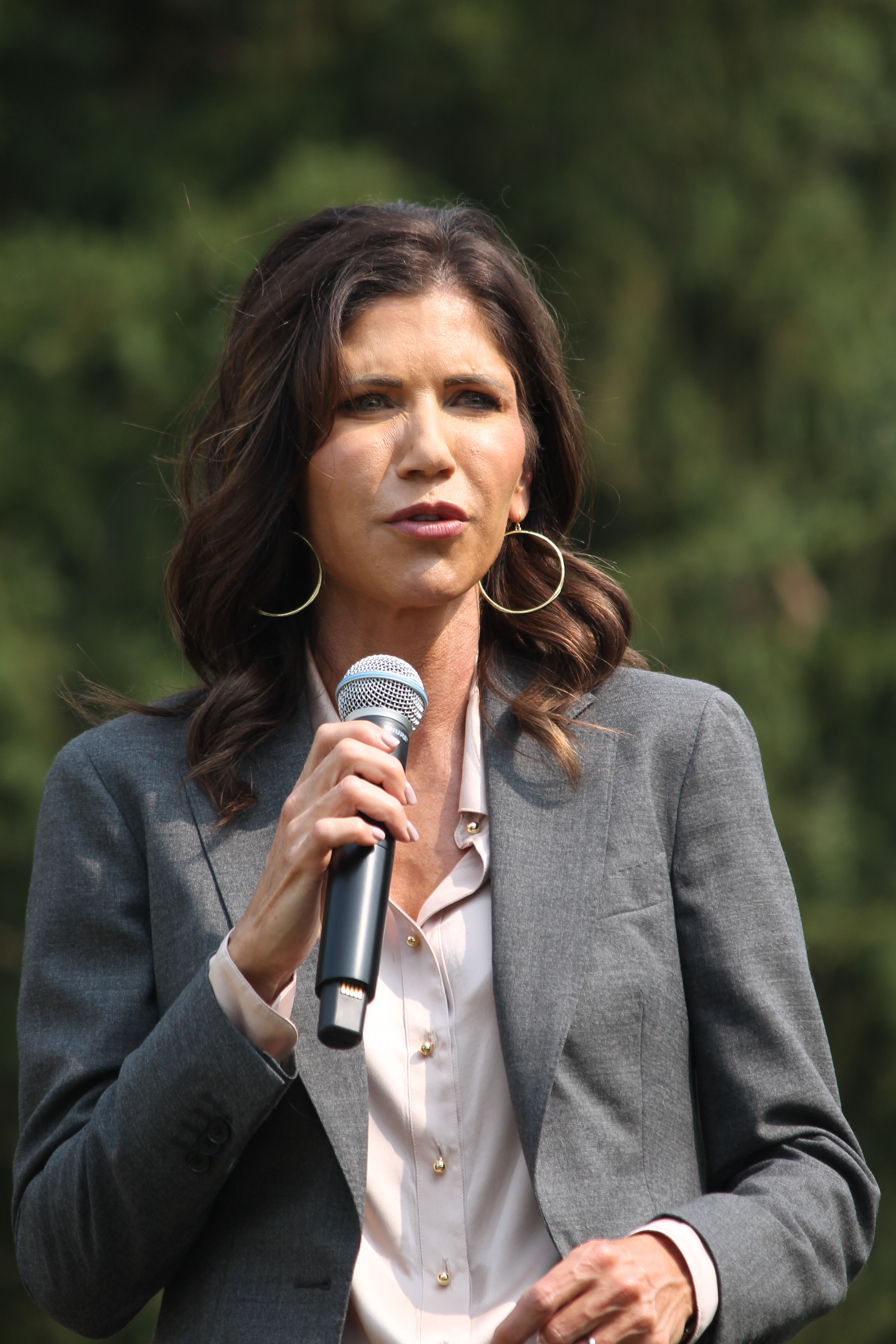
Kristi Noem

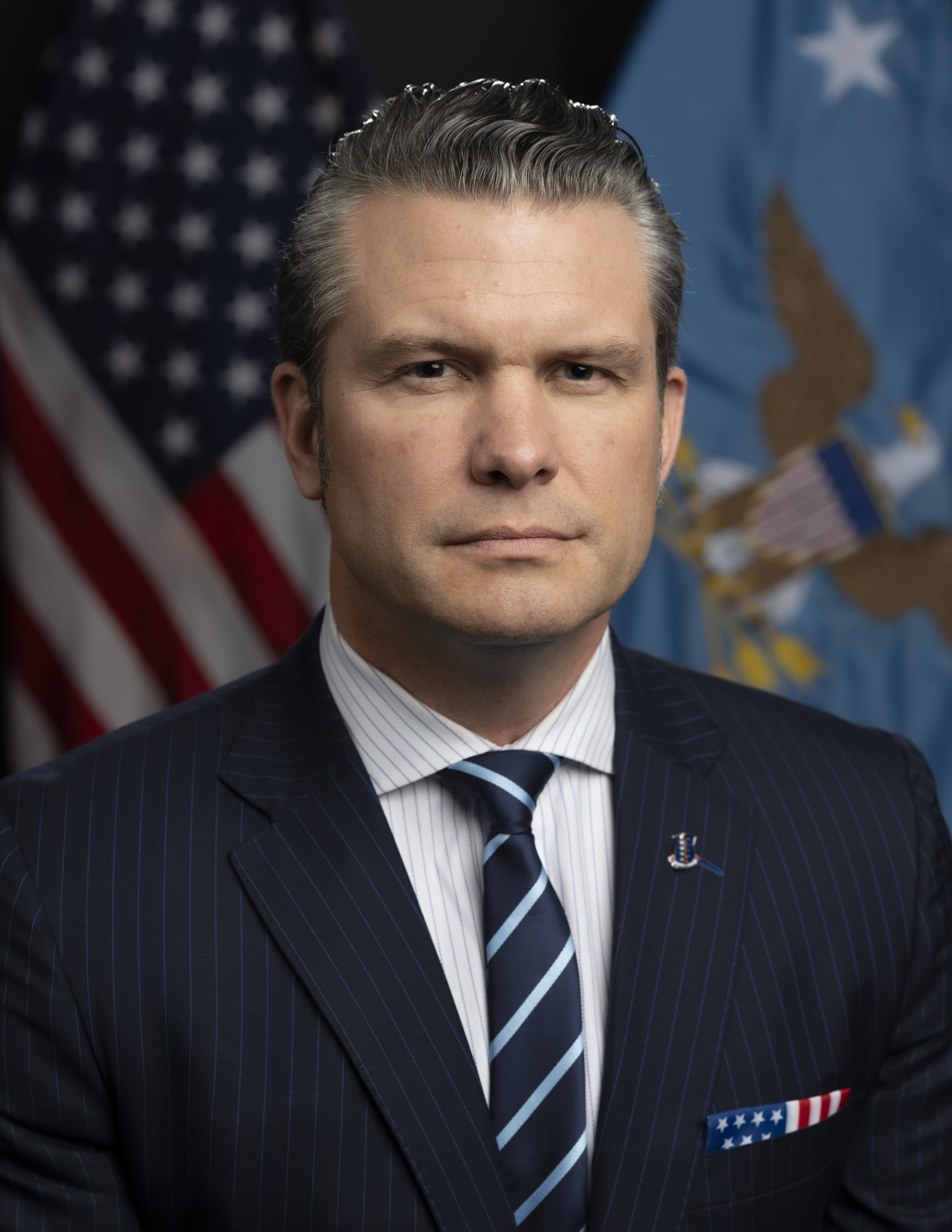
Pete Hegseth

- Fred G. Aandahl – (1897–1966) Republican politician who served as the 23rd Governor of North Dakota and as a U.S. Representative
- Knud Adland – (1829–1912) Wisconsin State Assemblyman
- Thomas Ryum Amlie – (1897–1973) U.S. Representative from Wisconsin
- Elmer L. Andersen – (1909–2004) American businessman, philanthropist, and the 30th Governor of Minnesota
- Canute Anderson – (1830–1893) Wisconsin State Assemblyman
- Nels Anderson – (1889–1986) Wisconsin State Assemblyman
- Sigurd Anderson – (1904–1990) 19th Governor of South Dakota, 17th Attorney General of South Dakota
- Sydney Anderson – (1881–1948) U.S. Representative from Minnesota
- John Ashcroft – United States politician, 79th United States attorney general
- Michele Bachmann – member of the United States House of Representatives, representing Minnesota's 6th congressional district
- Elmer Austin Benson – (1895–1985) American lawyer and politician from Minnesota
- Jan Brewer – 22nd Governor of Arizona
- Nils Andreas Boe – (1913–1992) American politician who served as the 23rd Governor of South Dakota
- Clarence Alfred Bottolfsen – (1891–1964) politician who served as the 17th and 19th Governor of Idaho
- Haldor Boen – (1851–1912) U.S. representative from Minnesota
- Eva Burch Elected 2022 Member of the Arizona Senate from the 9th district (Mother from Norway)
- Holm O. Bursum – (1867–1953) politician from New Mexico
- Olger B. Burtness – (1884–1960) U.S. Representative from North Dakota
- Lois Grimsrud Capps – U.S. Representative for California's 23rd congressional district
- Theodore Christianson – (1883–1948) American politician who served as the 21st Governor of Minnesota
- Charles A. Christopherson – (1871–1933) U.S. Representative from South Dakota
- John E. Erickson (Montana politician) – (March 14, 1863 – May 25, 1946) American politician of the Democratic Party from Montana
- Math Dahl – (1884–1976) North Dakota politician well known for his tenure as the North Dakota Commissioner of Agriculture and Labor from 1939 to 1964
- Clarence P. Dahl – (1892–1976) politician with the Republican Party who served as the Lieutenant Governor of North Dakota
- Arne Dahl – politician who served as the last North Dakota Commissioner of Agriculture and Labor
- Herman Dahle – (1855–1920) United States Congressman in the House of Representatives from Wisconsin
- Steve Daines – (born 1962) U.S. Senator from Montana
- James O. Davidson – (1854–1922) 21st Governor of Wisconsin, 19th Lieutenant Governor of Wisconsin, 13th Treasurer of Wisconsin, Wisconsin State Assemblyman
- Roland B. Day – (1919–2008) Wisconsin Supreme Court Justice from 1974 to 1996
- Arne Duncan – American education administrator and currently United States Secretary of Education.
- Joanell Dyrstad – 43rd Lieutenant Governor of Minnesota
- Herman Ekern – (1872–1954) politician who served as Lieutenant Governor of Wisconsin
- Oscar E. Erickson – (1884–1945) politician who served as the North Dakota Insurance Commissioner
- Michael O. Freeman – attorney and politician from the state of Minnesota
- Orville Freeman – (1918–2003) American Democratic politician who served as the 29th Governor of Minnesota
- Jennifer Granholm – Canadian born American politician of Norwegian and Swedish ancestry
- Nicolai A. Grevstad – (1851–1940) American diplomat, politician and newspaper
- Asle Gronna – (1858–1922) U.S. Senator from North Dakota
- Archie M. Gubbrud – (1910–1987) the 22nd Governor of South Dakota.
- Steve Gunderson – President and CEO of the Council on Foundations
- Carl Gunderson – (1864–1933) 11th Governor of South Dakota
- Henry Gunderson – (1878–1940) Wisconsin politician
- Deb Haaland – (1960–) U.S. Representative from New Mexico
- Harold Hagen – (1901–1957) Minnesota politician
- Kittel Halvorson – (1846–1936) U.S. Representative from Minnesota
- John Hamre – U.S. politician
- Bernt B. Haugan – (1862–1931) American Lutheran minister, politician
- Mary Margaret Haugen – Washington state senator
- Gilbert N. Haugen – (1859–1933) seventeen-term Republican U.S. Representative from Iowa's 4th congressional district
- Nils P. Haugen – (1849–1931) U.S. Congressman from Wisconsin, Wisconsin State Assemblyman
- Brynhild Haugland – (1905–1998) one of the first female legislators in the North Dakota Legislative Assembly and the longest serving state legislator in the history of the United States
- Curly Haugland – born Erling George Haugland, served as the Republican National Committeeman for North Dakota since 1999
- Nils Pederson Haugen – (1849–1931) U.S. Representative from Wisconsin
- Hans Christian Heg – (1829–1863) Norwegian- American politician and soldier in the American Civil War from Wisconsin
- Ralph Herseth – (1909–1969) the 21st Governor of South Dakota
- Ole P. Hoff – (1853–1924) Norwegian-American Republican politician and the first commissioner of labor in the U.S. state of Oregon.
- Martin Hersrud – (1880–1969) Republican member of the North Dakota House of Representatives
- Einar Hoidale – (1870–1952) U.S. Congressman from Minnesota
- Hubert Humphrey – (1911–1978), served under President Lyndon B. Johnson as the 38th Vice President of the United States.
- Henry M. Jackson – (1912–1983) U.S. Congressman and Senator from the state of Washington
- Maurice Johannessen – (born 1934) California State Senator
- Tim Johnson – U.S. Senator from South Dakota
- Coya Knutson – (1912–1996) U.S. Representative from Minnesota
- Harold Knutson – (1919–1923) House Majority Whip, U.S. Congressman from Minnesota
- Paul John Kvale – (1896–1960) U.S. Representative from Minnesota
- Ole J. Kvale – (1869–1929) U.S. Representative from Minnesota
- E. Floyd Kvamme – American engineer, venture capitalist, and government advisor
- Warren Magnuson – (1905–1989) United States Senator of the Democratic Party from Washington
- Roger Moe – American politician and former member and majority leader of the Minnesota Senate
- Walter Mondale – American Democratic Party politician, who served as the 42nd Vice President of the United States
- John Moses – (1885–1945) Norwegian-born, United States Senator and 22nd Governor of North Dakota
- Canute R. Matson – (1843–1903) Norwegian-born politician who served as Sheriff of Cook County, Illinois
- M. Alfred Michaelson – (1878–1949) U.S. Congressman from Illinois
- Janne Myrdal – Republican member of the North Dakota Senate
- John M. Nelson – (1870–1955) U.S. Representative from Wisconsin
- Knute Nelson – (1843–1923) Norwegian-born American politician
- Ragnvald A. Nestos – (1877–1942) 13th Governor of North Dakota, North Dakota State Representative
- Kristi Noem – Governor of South Dakota
- Pete Hegseth – (born 1980) Secretary of Defense and former television presenter from Minnesota
- Ole H. Olson – (1872–1954) elected to the North Dakota House of Representatives and later elected to the North Dakota State Senate.
- J. A. O. Preus – (1883–1961) American politician.
- Floyd B. Olson – (1891–1936) American politician, served as the 22nd Governor of Minnesota
- Allen I. Olson – Republican politician and attorney who served as the 28th Governor of North Dakota
- Sean Parnell – Governor of Alaska
- Al Quie – American politician who served as the 35th Governor of Minnesota
- Karl Rolvaag – U.S. politician
- Karl Rove – American Republican political consultant and policy advisor
- Martin Olav Sabo – American politician and member of the Democratic-Farmer-Labor Party
- Stephanie Herseth Sandlin – Attorney who served as the Democratic U.S. Representative for South Dakota's At-large congressional district
- Conrad Selvig – (1877–1953) U.S. Representative from Minnesota
- Henrik Shipstead – (1881–1960) American politician
- Arlan Stangeland – American politician from Minnesota
- Halvor Steenerson – (1852–1926) U.S. Congressman from Minnesota
- Henry Teigan – (1881–1941) American labor leader, editor and member of the United States House of Representatives from Minnesota.
- Jacob Thorkelson – (1876–1945) U.S. Congressman from Montana
- John Thune – U.S. Senator from South Dakota
- Edward John Thye – (1896–1969) 26th Governor of Minnesota and U.S. Senator
- Andrew Volstead – (1860–1947) American member of the United States House of Representatives from Minnesota
- Knud Wefald – (1869–1936) United States House of Representatives from Minnesota, Minnesota State Representative
- William Williamson – (1875–1972) U.S. Representative from South Dakota
- Harold Windingstad – (1929–2006) American politician from Minnesota

=== Published ===
- John Anderson – (1836–1910) Norwegian-born publisher.
- Tavi Gevinson – American writer, magazine editor, actress and singer.

=== Religious ===
- Marcus Borg – American Biblical scholar and author
- Elling Eielsen – (1804–1883) American minister and Lutheran Church leader.
- John O. Evjen – (1874–1942) American author, Lutheran church historian and professor of theology
- Albert C. Knudson – (1873–1953) Christian theologian in the Methodist tradition
- U. V. Koren – (1826–1910) American author, theologian and church leader
- Bernt Julius Muus – (1832–1900) Norwegian-born, Lutheran minister and church leader
- Russell M. Nelson – President of the Church of Jesus Christ of Latter-day Saints
- Olaf M. Norlie – (1876–1962), also referred to as O. M. Norlie, Lutheran minister, educator and scholar
- Sven Oftedal – (1844–1911) Norwegian-born, Lutheran minister who helped found the Lutheran Free Church
- Jacob Aall Ottesen Preus – American Lutheran clergy
- J. A. O. Preus II – (1920–1994) Lutheran pastor, professor, author, and church president
- Herman Amberg Preus – (1825–1894) American Lutheran clergyman and church leader
- Canute Peterson – (1824–1902) Norwegian Mormon pioneer settler of Utah Territory
- Christian Keyser Preus – (1852–1921) American Lutheran Minister who served as the second President of Luther College
- Robert Preus – (1924–1995) American Lutheran pastor, professor, author, and seminary president
- August Weenaas – (1835–1924) Norwegian-born Lutheran minister and educator
- William S. Skylstad – American Roman Catholic Bishop
- Peer Stromme – (1856–1921) American pastor, teacher, journalist, and author
- Hans Gerhard Stub – (1849–1931) American Lutheran theologian and church leader
- Georg Sverdrup (theologian) – (1848–1907) Norwegian-born Lutheran theologian and an educator
- Nils Otto Tank – (1800–1864) Moravian Church missionary
- Jacob Tanner – Norwegian-born, Lutheran minister, educator and religious author
- Abraham Vereide – (1886–1969) Norwegian-born Methodist clergyman and founder of Goodwill Industries of Seattle
- John A. Widtsoe – (1872–1952) member of the Quorum of the Twelve Apostles of The Church of Jesus Christ of Latter-Day Saints
- Mildred Bangs Wynkoop – (1905–1997) ordained minister in the Church of the Nazarene, who served as an educator, missionary and theologian

=== Scientists and engineers ===
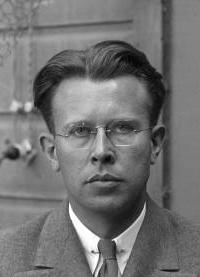
Ernest O. Lawrence

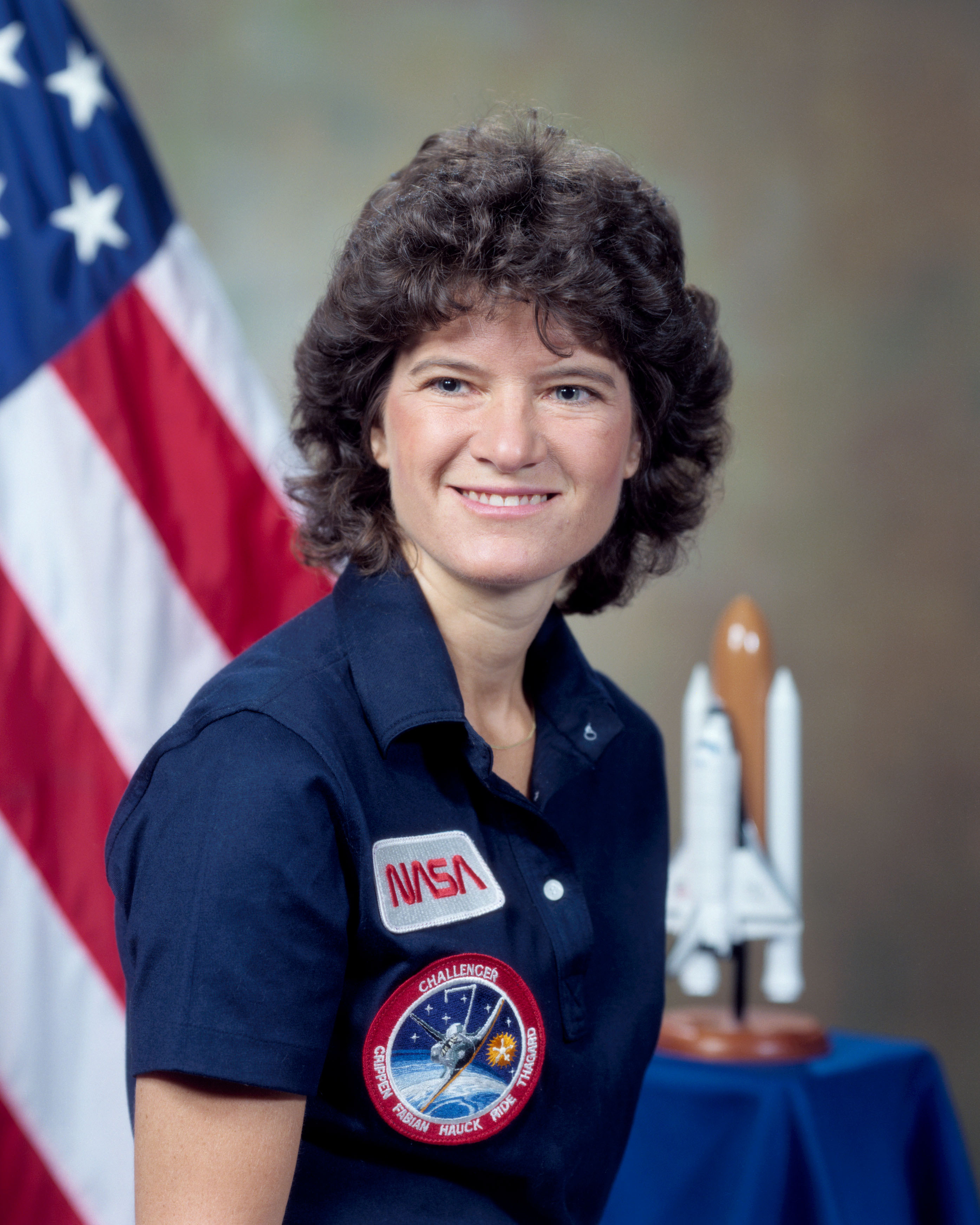
Sally Ride

- Philip Abelson – (1913–2004) American physicist, scientific editor, and science writer
- Christian B. Anfinsen – (1916–1995) American biochemist
- Peter Agre – American medical doctor, professor, and molecular biologist
- Neal Amundson – (1916–2011) American chemical engineer
- John August Anderson – (1876–1959) American astronomer. The crater Anderson on the Moon is named after him
- Erik Asphaug – American planetary scientist, winner of Urey Prize
- Gunvald Aus – (1851–1950) Norwegian-American engineer
- Daniel Baker – (1948–) American space scientist
- Earl Bakken – engineer, businessman and philanthropist of Dutch and Norwegian American ancestry
- Carl Georg Barth – (1860–1939) Norwegian-American mathematician and mechanical engineer
- Magnus Bjorndal – (September 13, 1899 – January 23, 1971) Norwegian American engineer and inventor
- Eduard Boeckmann – (1849–1927) Norwegian American ophthalmologist, physician and inventor
- Ivar Brogger – (1880–1963) electrical engineer and inventor
- William A. Bugge – (1900–1992) civil engineer
- Storm Bull – (1856–1907), engineer and educator
- Robert A. Dahl – Sterling Professor emeritus of political science at Yale University
- Olin J. Eggen – (1919–1998) American astronomer
- Claire Egtvedt – (1892–1975) - Airplane designer and president and chairman of the Boeing Company
- Douglas Engelbart – American inventor and early computer pioneer and internet pioneer
- Ole Evinrude – (1877–1934) Norwegian-American inventor, known for the invention of the first outboard motor with practical commercial application.
- Joe Foss – (1915–2003) leading fighter ace of the United States Marine Corps during World War II
- Mike Fossum – American astronaut
- Frederick C. Finkle – (1865–1949) American consulting engineer and geologist
- Ivar Giaever – (1929–2025) physicist who won the Nobel Prize in Physics in 1973
- Clarence Gonstead – (1898–1978) Doctor of Chiropractic and creator of the Gonstead Technique
- Lars Grimsrud – aerospace engineer and performance automobile
- Adolph Gundersen – (1865–1938) Norwegian-born American medical doctor and founder of Gundersen Lutheran Medical Center
- Robert C. Gunderson – (1931–2003) first supervisor of the Genealogical Society of Utah's Royalty Identification Unit
- Lawrence R. Hafstad – (1904–1993) American physicist and son of two Norwegian immigrants. Created first nuclear fission reaction in the United States.
- Alf Hjort – (1877–1944) Norwegian-born American electrical engineer
- Iver Johnson – U.S. firearms, bicycle, and motorcycle manufacturer
- Robert B. Ingebretsen – (1948–2003) pioneer in the development of digital sound
- Gary Kildall – (1942–1994) American computer scientist and microcomputer entrepreneur who created the CP/M operating system and founded Digital Research, Inc.
- Carl Otto Lampland – (1873–1951) American astronomer
- Norman Bernard Larsen (1923–1970) American industrial chemist who is sometimes credited with the invention of WD-40.
- Ernest Lawrence – (1901–1958) American physicist and Nobel Laureate
- John H. Lawrence – (1904–1991) American physicist and physician best known for pioneering the field of nuclear medicine
- Mark C. Lee – (1952–) American astronaut
- C. Walton Lillehei – (1918–1999) American surgeon who pioneered open-heart surgery
- Alfred M. Moen – (1916–2001) American inventor and founder of Moen, Inc.
- Olaus Murie – (1889–1963) called the "father of modern elk management", was a naturalist, author, and wildlife biologist
- Nathan Myhrvold – formerly Chief Technology Officer at Microsoft, is co-founder of Intellectual Ventures, and referred to by many as a patent troll.
- Ted Nelson – American sociologist, philosopher, and pioneer of information technology
- Peter Norman Nissen – (1871–1930) Canadian-American resident in United States. A mining engineer, developed the prefabricated shelter called the Nissen hut in 1916
- Karen Nyberg – mechanical engineer and retired NASA astronaut. Nyberg became the 50th woman in space on her first mission in 2008. First person to ever sew in space.
- Ken Olsen – (1926–2011) American engineer who co-founded Digital Equipment Corporation
- Tinius Olsen – (1845–1932) Norwegian-born American engineer and inventor
- Charles J. Pedersen – (1904–1989) American organic chemist best known for describing methods of synthesizing crown ethers
- Lars Onsager – (1903–1976) Norwegian-born American physical chemist and theoretical physicist
- Sally Ride – (1951–2012) American physicist and former NASA astronaut
- Ole Singstad – (1882–1969) Norwegian-American civil engineer who innovated the ventilation system for the Holland Tunnel
- Marius Nygaard Smith-Petersen – (1886–1953) Norwegian-born American physician and orthopaedic surgeon
- George Schlukbier – North American innovator who in the 1990s built Nando
- Elias Anton Cappelen Smith – (1873–1949) Norwegian American civil engineer and metallurgist
- Theodore Theodorsen – (1897–1978) Norwegian-American theoretical aerodynamicist noted for his work at NACA (the forerunner of NASA) and for his contributions to the study of turbulence
- Merle A. Tuve – (1901–1982) American scientist and geophysicist, the founding director of the Johns Hopkins University Applied Physics Laboratory
- Oswald Veblen – (1880–1960) American mathematician, geometer and topologist

=== Seamen ===
- Erik Eriksen (explorer) – (1820–1888) Norwegian ice sea captain born in Lyngør, Norway
- Thea Foss – (1857–1927) the founder of Foss Maritime, the largest tugboat company in the western United States.
- Andrew Furuseth – (1854–1938) Norwegian-born merchant seaman and American labor lead
- Sig Hansen (1966– ) – TV personality, and Captain of the fishing vessel Northwestern, featured in the TV series Deadliest Catch
- Harry Lundeberg – (1901–1957) merchant seaman and an American labor leader.
- G. Unger Vetlesen – (1889–1959) Norwegian shipbuilder and naturalized American philanthropist

=== Settlers ===
- Carl Martin Bergh – (1849–1906) Norwegian immigrant of United States who is most associated with the resettlement of fellow Scandinavian families to the area of James City County and York County surrounding the community of Norge, Virginia.
- Valdemar Knudsen – (1819–1898) sugar cane plantation pioneer on west Kauaʻi, Hawaii
- Cleng Peerson – (1783–1865) Norwegian-born pioneer who led the first group of Norwegians to emigrated to the United States
- James M. Wahl – (1846–1939) Norwegian-born settler and the first legislator of Lincoln County, South Dakota

=== Visual artists ===
- Mikkel Aaland – American photographer known for work in the early days of digital photography
- Hendrik Christian Andersen – (1872–1940) American sculptor, painter and urban planner
- Gene Amondson – (1943–2009) landscape painter, woodcarver, Christian minister and prohibition activist
- Sigvald Asbjornsen – (1867–1954) Norwegian-born sculptor
- Earl W. Bascom – (1906–1995) cowboy artist and sculptor, "cowboy of cowboy artists"
- Jon-Erik Beckjord – (1939–2008) paranormal investigator and photographer known for his far-reaching ideas regarding such phenomena as UFOs, crop circles, the Loch Ness Monster, and his specialty, Bigfoot
- Emil Biorn – (1864–1935) Norwegian-born, American sculptor, painter and composer
- Benjamin Blessum – (1877–1954) American painter, graphic artist and illustrator
- Bjorn Egeli – (1900–1984) Norwegian-born portrait artist
- Jacob Fjelde – (1855–1896) Norwegian-born American sculptor
- Pauline Fjelde – (1861–1923) Norwegian-born American painter, embroiderer, and textile artist
- Paul Fjelde – (1892–1984) noted American sculptor and educator
- Alexander Grinager – (1865–1949) American artist most noted for his murals and scenic painting
- Herbjørn Gausta – (1854–1924) American artist best known for his landscapes, portraits and scenes from rural settings
- Al Hansen – (1927–1995) American artist considered one of the most important Fluxus figures
- Lars Jonson Haukaness – (1863–1929) Norwegian-born American-Canadian impressionist painter and art instructor
- Per Lysne – (1880–1947) artist most associated with bringing the traditional Norwegian folk art of Rosemaling to the United States
- Eric Norstad – noted ceramicist and architect
- Karl Ouren – (1882–1943) Norwegian-born artist best known for his paintings of Norwegian landscapes and scenes
- Shag – American artist
- Yngvar Sonnichsen – (1873–1938) Norwegian-born American artist and painter
- Svend Rasmussen Svendsen – (1864–1945) Norwegian-born American impressionist artist.
- Trygve Rovelstad – (1903–1990) renowned sculptor and designer of medals
- Dan Weggeland – (1827–1918) considered the "Father of Utah Art", artist and teacher in the early history of Utah

=== Writers and editors ===
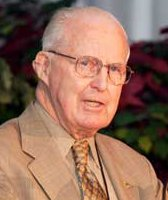
Norman Borlaug

- Rasmus B. Anderson – (1846–1936) American author, professor, and diplomat
- Christopher Bakken – American poet, translator, and professor at Allegheny College
- Robert Bly – American poet, author, activist and leader of the Mythopoetic men's movement
- Hjalmar Hjorth Boyesen – (1848–1895) Norwegian-born author and college professor
- Dorthea Dahl – (1881–1958) Norwegian-born, American writer
- George Helgesen Fitch – (1877–1915) American author, humorist, and journalist
- Rolf G. Fjelde – (1926–2002) American playwright, educator and poet
- Kathryn Forbes – (1908–1966) American writer and memoirist
- George T. Flom – (1871–1960) American professor of linguistics and author of numerous reference books
- Greta Gaard – ecofeminist writer, scholar, activist, and documentary filmmaker
- Rudolph Hjalmar Gjelsness – (1894–1968) prominent American librarian and literary translator who served as Dean of the University of Michigan's Library Science Department
- Ingebrikt Grose – (1862–1939) author, college professor and founding president of Concordia College
- Haldor Johan Hanson – (1856–1929) American hymn writer, publisher and author
- Gregory T. Haugan – American author and expert in the field of work breakdown structure
- Eva Lund Haugen – (1907–1996) American author and editor
- Einar Haugen – (1906–1994) American linguist, author and Professor at University of Wisconsin–Madison and Harvard University
- Michael Hauge – script consultant, author and lecturer
- Johan Andreas Holvik – (1880–1960) author and professor at Concordia College in Moorhead, Minnesota
- Siri Hustvedt – American writer, novelist
- Randolph Edgar Haugan – (1902–1985) American author, editor and publisher
- Simon Johnson – (1874–1970) Norwegian-born American novelist
- Harold Knutson – American editor
- Arne Brun Lie – (1925–2010) Norwegian-American author and Holocaust survivor
- Greg Mortenson – American humanitarian, professional speaker, writer, and former mountaineer
- Gerhard Brandt Naeseth – (1913–1994) American librarian and genealogist
- Ingri Parin d'Aulaire – writer and illustrator of children's books in the 20th century
- Ole Edvart Rølvaag – (1876–1931) American novelist and professor
- Aagot Raaen – (1873–1957) American author and educator
- Peter Straub – American author and poet
- Elise Wærenskjold – (1815–1895) Norwegian-American writer
- Agnes Mathilde Wergeland – (1857–1914) Norwegian-American historian, poet and educator

=== Others ===
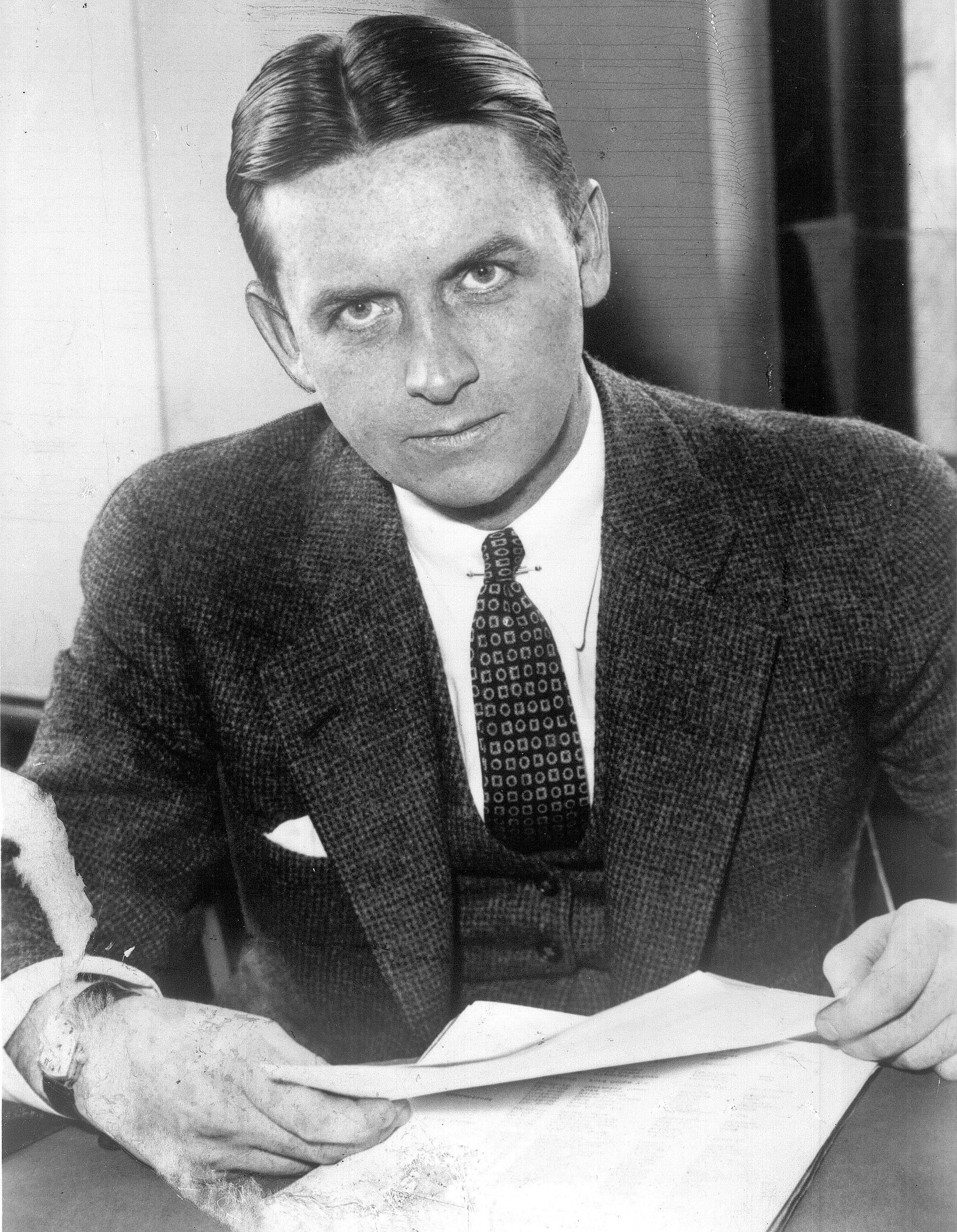
Eliot Ness

- Gunvald Aus – Norwegian-American engineer, most associated with the engineering of the Woolworth Building in New York City together with fellow Norwegian Kort Berle
- Gunnar Berg (Scouting) – (1897–1987) national director of the Boy Scouts of America
- Norman Borlaug – (1914–2009) American agronomist, humanitarian, and Nobel laureate who has been called "the father of the Green Revolution"
- Ward Christensen - co-founder of bulletin board system (BBS)
- Ophelia Dahl – American social justice and health care advocate
- Steve Dahl – Chicago radio personality and humorist
- Jeffrey Dahmer — Serial killer; Mother was from Norwegian ancestry
- Helga Estby – (1860–1942) Norwegian-American immigrant most noted for her walk across the United States during 1896
- David Grose – (1944–2004) world-renowned authority on the classification of early ancient glass from the Roman period
- Robert Hanssen – spied for Soviet and Russian intelligence services against the United States
- George Harbo – (1870–1946) Norwegian-born American who in 1896, became the first people ever to row across an ocean.
- Alf Gundersen
- Belle Gunness – (1859–c. 1908) Norwegian-born American serial killer
- Frances Haugen - American data engineer and scientist, product manager, and whistleblower.
- Clint Hill (Secret Service) – Secret Service agent who was the one that jumped onto the back of President JFK's car during assassination.
- Paris Hilton – American heiress and media personality. She is a great-granddaughter of Conrad Hilton (founder of Hilton Hotels)
- Oscar Hauge – (1868–1945) served on the Los Angeles County Board of Supervisors
- Merle Hansen – (1919–2009) founding president of the North American Farm Alliance and a spokesman for the plight of family farmers.
- Thom Hartmann – (born 1951) Progressive/liberal talk radio host and author. Founded the theory of the Hunter vs. farmer hypothesis in regard to Attention deficit hyperactivity disorder. Founded The Hunter School in Rumney, New Hampshire – which he co-founded with his wife Louise.
- Clarence Iverson – popular radio personalities in the Midwest during the 1930s and 1940s
- Soren Johnson - American computer game designer
- Gunnar Kaasen – (1882–1960) Norwegian-born musher who delivered a cylinder containing 300,000 units of diphtheria antitoxin to Nome, Alaska, in 1925, as the last leg of a dog sled relay that saved the U.S. city from an epidemic
- Eliot Ness – (1903–1957) American Prohibition agent, famous for his efforts to enforce Prohibition in Chicago, Illinois, also the leader of team The Untouchables
- Pat Paulsen – (1927–1997) American comedian and satirist notable for his roles on several of the Smothers Brothers TV shows, and for his campaigns for President of the United States
- Frank Samuelsen – (1870–1946) Norwegian-born American who in 1896, became the first people ever to row across an ocean
- Tim Schafer – American computer game designer
- Henry Seadlund - Kidnapper and killer who received the death sentence and was put to death by electric chair in Cook County Jail, Chicago, Illinois
- Nels Skumsrud
- Jacqueline Smith – Norwegian trade unionist
- Thorvald Solberg – (1852–1949) first Register of Copyrights (1897–1930) in the United States Copyright Office
- Frank Stephenson - (born 1959) Automobile designer
- Per Ivarson Undi – (1803–1860) also known as Peter Iverson, early Norwegian-American homesteader in Wisconsin Territory

== See also ==
- List of Norwegians
- Norwegians
