= Jacob Preus =

Jacob Preus, more completely Jacob Aall Ottesen Preus, is the name of three generations of important American Lutherans:

- J. A. O. Preus (1883–1961), politician, Governor of Minnesota from 1921 to 1925
- J. A. O. Preus II (1920–1994), theologian, President of the Lutheran Church - Missouri Synod from 1969 to 1981
- J. A. O. Preus III (born 1953), theologian, President of Concordia University, Irvine, California

== See also ==
- Preus, more people with the same surname
