= Ottesen =

Ottesen is a surname. Notable people with the surname include:

- Camilla Ottesen (born 1972), Danish television presenter
- Carl Ottesen (1918–1972), Danish actor, screenwriter and film director
- Elise Ottesen-Jensen (1886–1973), Norwegian-Swedish sex educator, journalist and anarchist agitator
- Jacob Aaal Ottesen Preus III (1953–2022), former president of Concordia University in Irvine, California
- Jacob Aall Ottesen Preus (1883–1961), American politician
- Jacob Aall Ottesen Preus II (1920–1994), Lutheran pastor, professor, author, and church president
- Jakob Aall Ottesen Larsen (1888–1974), an American classical scholar
- Marian Saastad Ottesen (born 1975), Norwegian actress
- Janove Ottesen (born 1975), Norwegian musician
- Jeanette Ottesen (born 1987), Danish swimmer
- Lasse Ottesen (born 1974), Norwegian former ski jumper
- Realf Ottesen Brandt (1859–1927), American Lutheran minister
- Sölvi Ottesen (born 1984), Icelandic footballer
- Sturla Ottesen (born 2001), Norwegian footballer
- Tyge Ottesen Brahe (1546–1601), Danish nobleman known for his accurate and comprehensive astronomical and planetary observations
