= David W. Preus =

American Lutheran minister and presiding bishop (1922–2021)

David Walter Preus
- Born: May 28, 1922; Madison, Wisconsin, U.S.
- Died: July 23, 2021 (aged 99); Minneapolis, Minnesota, U.S.
- Education: Luther College; Luther Theological Seminary
- Occupations: Pastor, bishop, professor
- Spouse: Ann Margaret Overgaard Madsen Preus
- Children: 2 sons, 3 daughters
- Religion: Lutheranism
- Church: American Lutheran Church
- Ordained: 1950
- Congregations served: Brookings, South Dakota; Vermillion, South Dakota; Minneapolis, Minnesota; Moorhead, Minnesota
- Offices held: ALC President/Presiding Bishop 1973–1987; ALC Vice-president 1966–1972

David Walter Preus (May 28, 1922 – July 23, 2021) was an American Lutheran minister. He served as the last president/presiding bishop of the American Lutheran Church (ALC) from 1973 until that body merged into the Evangelical Lutheran Church in America (ELCA) in 1988.

== Birth and early life ==
Preus was born on May 28, 1922, in Madison, Wisconsin. He grew up in Decorah, Iowa, where his father was a pastor and professor at Luther College. His mother was a musician.

He attended college at Luther College, graduating in 1943. After college he enlisted in the U.S. Army and served in the U.S. Army Signal Intelligence until 1946. He learned Japanese during duty in the Philippines and in Japan.

After his military service, Preus enrolled in the University of Minnesota Law School for a year. He then enrolled in Luther Theological Seminary in St. Paul, Minnesota, and was ordained in 1951.

== Career ==
Preus served as a pastor for 25 years at various congregations. His first pastorate was in Brookings, South Dakota, where he married Ann Margaret Overgaard Madsen in 1951. He later served a congregation in Vermillion, South Dakota, and at University Lutheran Church of Hope in Minneapolis, Minnesota. During the 1960s, he served on the Minneapolis School Board, including two years as its chairman. He also served on the Minneapolis City Planning Commission, and other civic organizations.

In 1968, Preus was elected as vice-president of the ALC, and in 1973, he was elected president (later renamed to presiding bishop). Discussions during his tenure led to the merger of the ALC, the Lutheran Church in America, and the Association of Evangelical Lutheran Churches to form the ELCA on January 1, 1988. While ALC president, he also served as vice president of the Lutheran World Federation and as a member of the Central Committee of the World Council of Churches. During much of the time that Preus was presiding bishop of the ALC, his cousin J. A. O. Preus II was the president of the Lutheran Church–Missouri Synod.

In 1988, Preus was appointed a distinguished visiting professor at Luther Seminary and director of its Global Mission Institute. After retiring from those positions in 1994, he continued to preach and write. From 1994 to 1996 he served as senior pastor of Trinity Lutheran Church in Moorhead, Minnesota.

== Death ==
Preus died on July 23, 2021, in Minneapolis. His funeral and interment service took place on August 1, 2021, at Trinity Lutheran Church in Laporte, Minnesota.

== Works ==
- Preus, David W. (2011). Pastor and President: Reflections of a Lutheran Churchman. Lutheran University Press. ISBN 978-1932688641.

== See also ==
- Herman Amberg Preus (1825–1894)
- Robert Preus (1924–1995)
- J. A. O. Preus (1883–1961)
- Christian Keyser Preus (1852–1921)
- Ove J. H. Preus (1880–1951)
- J. A. O. Preus III (born 1953)
