= Ove J. H. Preus =

Fourth president of Luther College in Decorah, Iwoa

- Born: January 21, 1880; Spring Prairie, Wisconsin
- Died: February 13, 1951 (aged 71); Decorah, Iowa
- Education: Luther Seminary
- Spouse: Amanda Magdalene Forde
- Parent: Christian Keyser Preus
- Church: Norwegian Lutheran Church of America
- Ordained: 1904
- Offices held: President, Augustana College (1929-1932); President, Luther College (1932-1948)

Ove J. H. Preus (January 21, 1880 – February 13, 1951) was the fourth president of Luther College in Decorah, Iowa.

== Early life ==
Ove J. H. Preus was born January 21, 1880, in Spring Prairie, Wisconsin, to Christian Keyser Preus and Louise Augusta Hjort. Preus attended Luther College from 1895 to 1901, earning degrees in theology and law. Preus later graduated from Luther Seminary in 1904, and spent a year at Johns Hopkins University from 1904 to 1905.

== Career ==
Between 1905 and 1929, Preus served as pastor to congregations in Tacoma, Washington, and in California. He was appointed president of Augustana College in Sioux Falls, South Dakota, in 1929.

=== President of Luther College ===
In 1932, Preus was elected the fourth president of Luther College in Decorah, Iowa. His father, Christian Keyser Preus, had served as the second president of the college from 1902 to 1921. When Preus assumed the presidency, the college was facing many problems, including financial troubles, declining enrollment, and faculty cuts. Under his presidency, the college began admitting women beginning in 1936. Preus also helped organize the Diamond Jubilee of Luther College in 1936, and oversaw the transition of power from the Board of Education of the Norwegian Lutheran Church of America to the Board of Trustees of Luther College, freeing the college from the control of the church. On June 3, 1948, Preus retired as president. He continued teaching Norwegian culture at the college until his death on February 13, 1951.

== Personal life ==
Preus married Amanda Magdalene Forde in 1908, and they had six children.

== See also ==
- Herman Amberg Preus (1825–1894)
- Robert Preus (1924–1995)
- Christian Keyser Preus (1852–1921)
- J. A. O. Preus (1883–1961)
- J. A. O. Preus II (1920–1994)
- J. A. O. Preus III (1953-2022)
- David W. Preus (1922–2021)
