= Malia Ann Kawailanamalie Petersen =

Malia Ann Kawailanamalie Petersen is a Hawaiian hula dancer of Norwegian and American descent. Malia attended Saint Patrick School in Kaimuki, and the University Laboratory School in Mānoa.

Malia Ann Kawailanamalie Petersen is a Hula Halau 'O Kamuela dancer and won the 2002 Miss Aloha Hula contest of The 39th Annual Merrie Monarch Festival.

Petersen of Hula Halau O Kamuela won the title of Miss Aloha Hula 2002 over 11 other dancers in the competition held at the Edith Kanaka'ole Tennis Stadium in Hilo.

Petersen is a former Miss Keiki Hula.

== See also ==
- Norway
- List of Norwegian Americans
- Merrie Monarch Festival
