= 1918 Minnesota State Auditor election =

- November 5, 1918
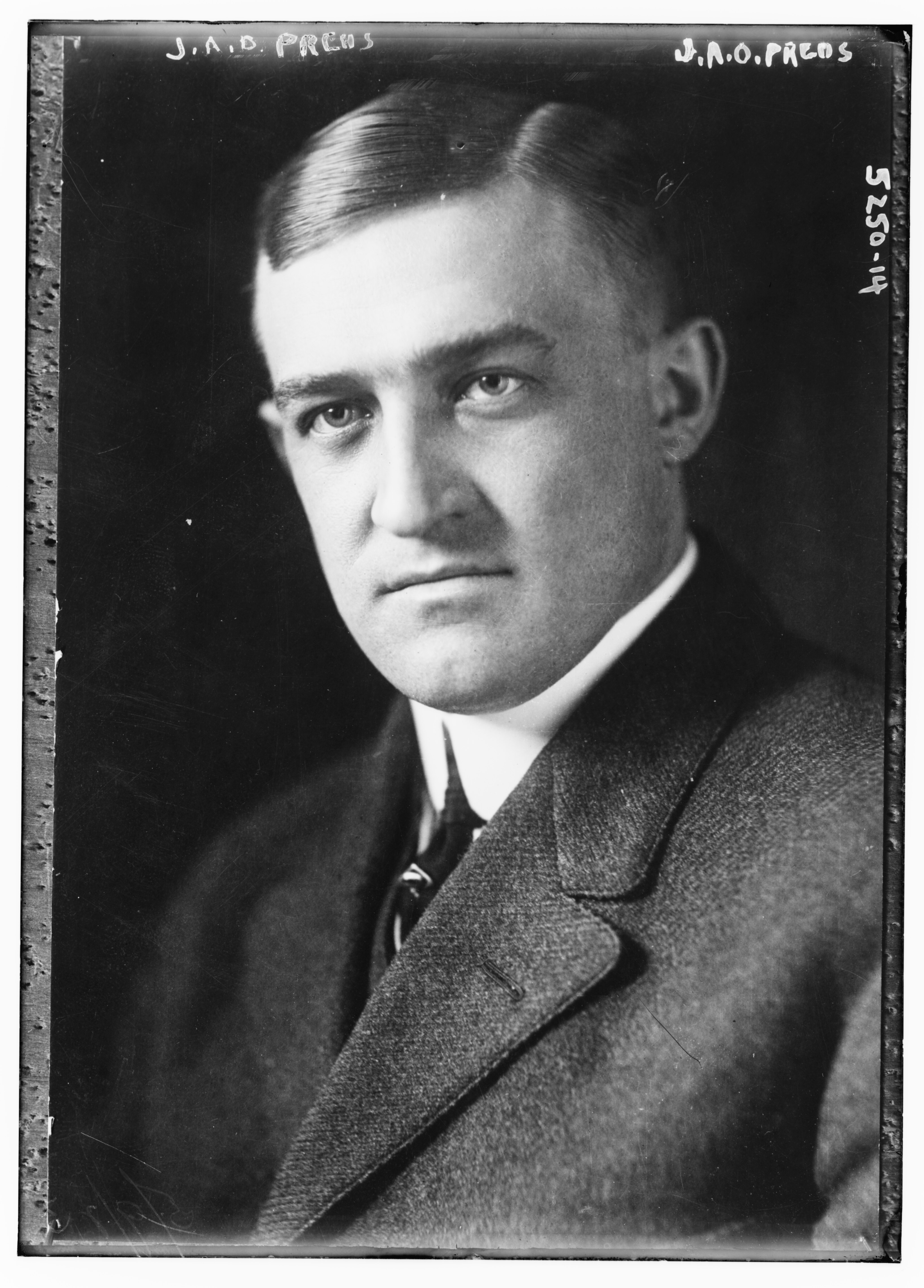

| Nominee | J. A. O. Preus | Larke W. Huntley | Fremont R. McManigal |
| Party | Republican | Democratic | National |
| Popular vote | 214,278 | 89,433 | 37,657 |
| Percentage | 62.77% | 26.20% | 11.03% |
State Auditor before election
J. A. O. Preus
Republican
Elected State Auditor
J. A. O. Preus
Republican

The 1918 Minnesota State Auditor election was held on November 5, 1918, in order to elect the state auditor of Minnesota. Republican nominee and incumbent state auditor J. A. O. Preus defeated Democratic nominee Larke W. Huntley and National nominee Fremont R. McManigal.

== General election ==
On election day, November 5, 1918, Republican nominee J. A. O. Preus won re-election by a margin of 124,845 votes against his foremost opponent Democratic nominee Larke W. Huntley, thereby retaining Republican control over the office of state auditor. Preus was sworn in for his second term on January 3, 1919.

=== Results ===
Minnesota State Auditor election, 1918
| Party | Candidate | Votes | % |
|---|---|---|---|
| Republican | J. A. O. Preus (incumbent) | 214,278 | 62.77 |
| Democratic | Larke W. Huntley | 89,433 | 26.20 |
| National | Fremont R. McManigal | 37,657 | 11.03 |
| Total votes | | 341,368 | 100.00 |
| Republican hold | | | |
