= Preuss =

Preuss or Preuß is a German surname derived from Preussen, the German word for Prussia, and may refer to:

- Charles Preuss (1803–1854), surveyor and cartographer on Fremont expeditions in the American West
- Christoph Preuß (born 1981), German football player
- Franziska Preuß (born 1994), German biathlete
- Hugo Preuß (1860–1925), German lawyer and liberal politician
- Josefine Preuß (born 1986), German actress
- Konrad Theodor Preuss (1869–1938), German ethnologist
- Paul Preuss (author) (born 1942), American science-fiction author and science consultant for film companies
- Paul Preuss (climber) (1886–1913), Austrian mountain climber
- Ted Preuss (born 1962), American fine art photographer
- Werner Preuss (1894-1919), German fighter ace

== See also ==
- Preus (surname)
- Preuss's monkey, a diurnal primate
- The Preuss School UCSD, a coeducational college-preparatory charter day school established on the University of California, San Diego campus
