= Bethany Lutheran Theological Seminary =

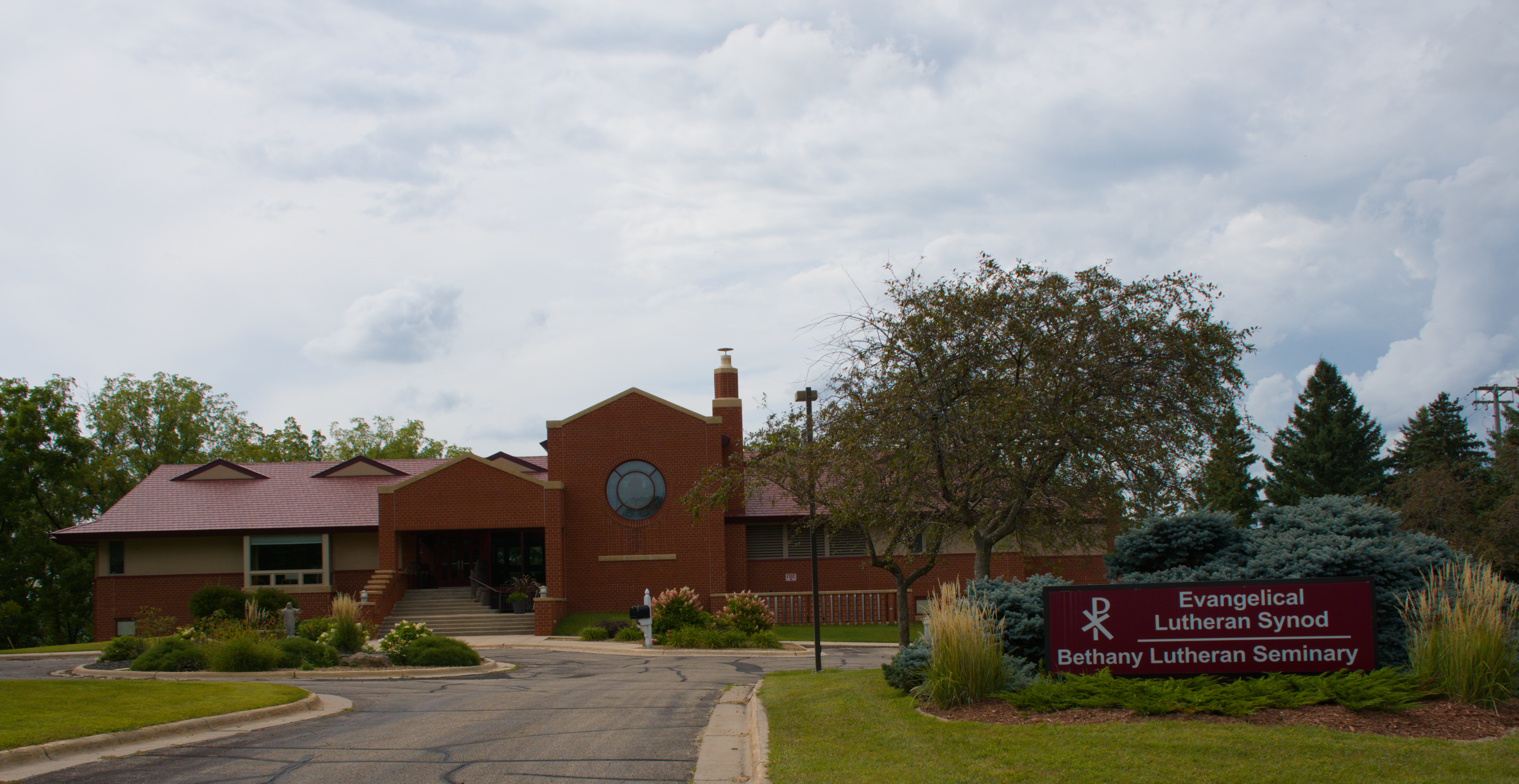
- Motto: One Thing Needful
- Type: Theological seminary
- Established: 1946
- Affiliations: Evangelical Lutheran Synod
- President: Rev. Timothy Hartwig
- Academic staff: 3 Full-time, 3 Adjunct
- Location: Mankato, Minnesota, USA; 44°10′6″N 93°59′21″W
- Campus: Small town
- Website: www.blts.edu

Bethany Lutheran Theological Seminary (BLTS) is the training school for pastors of the Evangelical Lutheran Synod.

== History ==
Founded in 1946, BLTS was essentially a department of Bethany Lutheran College (BLC), before the two institutions were officially separated in 1974. BLTS is located adjacent to the BLC campus, which overlooks the Minnesota River valley in Mankato, Minnesota, a community of about 53,000. From 1946 through 1974, as a department of the college, the seminary was headed by the Dean of the Seminary. These deans included Norman A. Madson and Milton Otto. In 1974, the seminary was separated from the college and given its own president, thus the office of Dean of the Seminary was eliminated. The first president of the newly separated seminary was Theodore A. Aaberg, who was forced to resign due to health issues a few years later. Glenn Reichwald served as acting president for the 1979–1980 school year until Wilhelm W. Petersen was installed as the new president. Upon his retirement in 1997, Gaylin R. Schmeling was called. He retired in 2022, and Timothy Hartwig was installed as the next president.

== Academics ==
BLTS awards two different degrees. First and foremost, BLTS exists to train Lutheran pastors for parish ministry. Therefore, it offers a four-year course of study culminating in the Master of Divinity (M.Div.) that is the basic degree for most clergy in North America. Secondly, BLTS offers a Master of Arts (M.A.) in Lutheran Theological Studies for interested laymen who do not want to enter the public ministry but are interested in a deeper study of Lutheran history and theology. The curriculum centers on the four basic divisions of theology: Biblical Theology, the study of the Bible in its original languages; Systematic Theology, the study of the doctrines gleaned from the Bible; Historical Theology, the study of the history of the Church in relation to the collected doctrines thereof; and Practical Theology, the study of everyday functions of the pastoral office such as preaching, teaching, and counseling.

== Notable graduates ==
- Robert Preus (1946), professor at Concordia Seminary and president of Concordia Theological Seminary
- Gunnar Stålsett (1959)
