= Robert Preus =

American Lutheran pastor, professor, author, and seminary president (1924 – 1995)

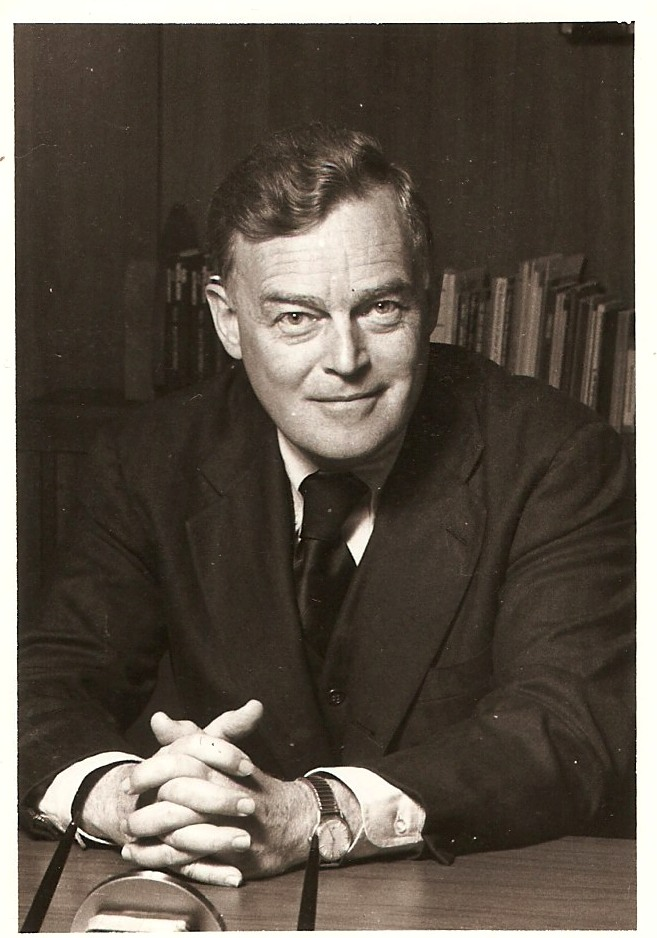
- Preus in his study
- Born: October 16, 1924
- Died: November 4, 1995 (aged 71)
- Education: Luther College (BA); Bethany Lutheran Theological Seminary; University of Edinburgh (ThD); University of Strasbourg (PhD)
- Spouse: Donna Rockman
- Parent(s): Jacob A. O. ("Jake") Preus and Idella Haugen Preus

Ecclesiastical career
- Church: Lutheran Church–Missouri Synod (LCMS)
- Ordained: October 1947
- Offices held: President, Concordia Theological Seminary (1974-1989)

Robert David Preus (October 16, 1924 – November 4, 1995) was an American Lutheran pastor, professor, author, and seminary president.

== Biography ==
Robert Preus was born to Minnesota Governor J.A.O. Preus and Idella Haugen Preus. His older brother is J.A.O. Preus II, former president of the Lutheran Church – Missouri Synod (LCMS).

Preus graduated from Luther College with a B.A. degree and thereafter entered Luther Theological Seminary in St. Paul, Minnesota, where his uncle Herman Preus served as a professor. Preus found Luther Seminary, which was the seminary of the Norwegian Lutheran Church of America (NLCA), to be theologically compromising and indifferent, so he left to attend the newly formed Bethany Lutheran Theological Seminary of the Evangelical Lutheran Synod (ELS) in Mankato, Minnesota. The ELS had been founded by a group of Norwegian Lutherans congregations that had not joined the merger creating the NLCA in 1917 and had remained in the Evangelical Lutheran Synodical Conference of North America with the LCMS. Preus became the seminary's first graduate in 1947.

Preus was ordained in October 1947. He served congregations in Mayville, North Dakota, and Bygland, Minnesota. He married Donna Rockman in 1948. They had ten children (six sons and four daughters) and more than 50 grandchildren.

Preus entered the University of Minnesota in 1949, and then the University of Edinburgh, where he completed his first doctorate in theology under Thomas F. Torrance in 1952. After earning his doctorate, Preus was appointed pastor at Harvard Street Church in Cambridge, Massachusetts. He served the congregation for three years and then served three congregations near Fosston, Minnesota.

In 1957, Preus was appointed instructor of systematics (creeds and confessions) and philosophy at Concordia Seminary in St. Louis, Missouri. Also in 1957, Preus' book The Inspiration of Scripture: A Study of the Theology of the Seventeenth Century Lutheran Dogmaticians was reissued by the publishing house of the ELS. Preus' work came at a time when controversies over the inspiration of Scripture were confronting Lutheranism in America, and specifically, in the LCMS at Concordia Seminary. The Seminex controversy involving the doctrine of Biblical inspiration was met by Preus (among a minority of four others at Concordia Seminary) and his brother, Jack, who was at that time the president of the LCMS. Preus refused to teach or use the historical-critical method of Biblical interpretation, a stance reaffirmed and adopted by the LCMS in its New Orleans Convention in 1973.

In 1969, Preus earned a second doctorate from the University of Strasbourg in France. From this was produced The Theology of Post-Reformation Lutheranism. This "established Preus as the leading English-language interpreter of the seventeenth-century Lutheran divines".

Preus was appointed president of Concordia Theological Seminary in Springfield, Illinois, in 1974. In 1976, the seminary was moved to Fort Wayne, Indiana, where it had been founded over a hundred years earlier.

Preus served for years on the LCMS Board of Missions and was a board member for Lutheran Bible Translators from 1960 to 1980. He also taught about and fought against the Church Growth movement at Concordia Theological Seminary and throughout Lutheranism and Christianity, although in a seminary publication he once stated that "Concordia Theological Seminary is a church-growth seminary". As president of the seminary, he promoted confessional Lutheran theology. In 1991, he created the Luther Academy, a Lutheran foundation that has the goal of the production of a Confessional Lutheran Dogmatics series of books.

Preus participated in a number of interdenominational ventures. He was among leading evangelical theologians who signed the Chicago Statement on Biblical Inerrancy (1978) and further participated in the three summits of the International Council on Biblical Inerrancy (1978, 1982, and 1986). Preus also served as one of the translators of the New International Version of the Bible.

Preus was "honorably retired" against his wishes in 1989. Although reinstated by the synod as seminary president and restored to the clergy roster of the LCMS, LCMS officials would not accept the outcome. In 1992 the synod elected a new president and much was done to resolve the situation, but this proved to be insufficient. Preus never regained the presidency, and died in 1995, months before he was scheduled to preach at the chapel at Concordia Theological Seminary. During his last years, Preus continued teaching and preaching. His private library was donated to Bethany Lutheran College in Mankato, Minnesota.

== Selected works ==
- The Inspiration of Scripture: A Study of the Theology of Seventeenth Century Lutheran Dogmaticians
- The Theology of Post-Reformation Lutheranism (2 Volumes)
- Getting Into The Theology of Concord: A Study of the Book of Concord
- Justification and Rome: An Evaluation of Recent Dialogues
- Preaching to Young Theologians: Sermons of Robert Preus
- Doctrine is Life: Robert D. Preus Essays on Scripture
- Doctrine is Life: Robert D. Preus Essays on Justification and the Lutheran Confessions

== See also ==
- Herman Amberg Preus (1825–1894)
- Christian Keyser Preus (1852–1921)
- Ove J. H. Preus (1880–1951)
- J. A. O. Preus III (1953–2022)
- David W. Preus (1922–2021)
