= J. A. O. Preus II =

American Lutheran theologian (1920–1994)

- Born: January 8, 1920; Saint Paul, Minnesota
- Died: August 13, 1994 (aged 74); Burnsville, Minnesota
- Education: Concordia Seminary
- Spouse: Delpha Mae Holleque
- Parent: Jacob A. O. ("Jake") Preus
- Church: Lutheran Church–Missouri Synod (LCMS)
- Ordained: 1945
- Offices held: President, LCMS (1969-1981); President, Concordia Theological Seminary (1962-1969)

Jacob Aall Ottesen Preus II (January 8, 1920 – August 13, 1994) was an American Lutheran pastor, professor, author, seminary president and church denominational president. He served as the eighth president of the Lutheran Church–Missouri Synod (LCMS) from 1969 to 1981. He was a major figure in the "Seminex" theological/political controversy, which resulted in a schism in the LCMS during the early 1970s.

== Career ==
Preus was born on January 8, 1920, in Saint Paul, Minnesota. He attended Luther Theological Seminary in Minneapolis, Minnesota, graduating in 1945. While in school he married Delpha Mae Holleque on June 12, 1943. He was ordained a pastor and served several congregations in Minnesota. He received a Ph.D. from the University of Minnesota in 1951.

In 1958, he moved to Concordia Theological Seminary, then in Springfield, Illinois, as a professor. He became the president of the seminary in 1962.

In 1969, Preus was elected president of the LCMS, upsetting the incumbent, Oliver R. Harms. Preus represented a theologically more conservative wing of the LCMS, and his administration worked to reverse the policies of the more moderate administration preceding his.

In 1973–74, a battle over teachings at the LCMS's flagship seminary, Concordia Seminary in St. Louis, resulted in the suspension of the president of the seminary, John Tietjen, and the walkout of most of seminary's professors and students to form a rival seminary known as Concordia Seminary-in-Exile or Seminex. This resulted in a schism in the LCMS, with a small group eventually leaving the synod to form the Association of Evangelical Lutheran Churches in 1976. The AELC served as a catalyst for the merger of the moderate and liberal Lutheran churches in the United States into the Evangelical Lutheran Church in America in 1988.

Preus was named President Emeritus of the LCMS in 1992. He died in Burnsville, Minnesota on August 13, 1994.

== Scholarship ==
Preus was known as a scholar of the Orthodoxy period of Lutheran history, especially of Lutheran Protestant theologian Martin Chemnitz (1522–1586). He translated many of Chemnitz's works into English, including The Two Natures in Christ (1971), The Lord's Supper (1979), Justification: The Chief Article of Christian Doctrine as Expounded in Loci Theologici (1985), and Loci theologici (1989). His own works include What Stands Between? (1949) and It Is Written (1971). His last work, published in 1994, was a biography of Chemnitz titled The Second Martin: The Life and Theology of Martin Chemnitz.

== Relatives ==
Preus's grandfather Herman Amberg Preus was an influential Midwestern Norwegian Lutheran seminary professor. His father, Jacob A. O. ("Jake") Preus, was a politician who served as Minnesota's eighth state auditor and 20th governor in the 1920s. His brother, Robert Preus, was a graduate of the Evangelical Lutheran Synod's Bethany Lutheran Theological Seminary, professor of the LCMS's Concordia Seminary, and later president of Concordia Theological Seminary in Fort Wayne, Indiana. His son, J. A. O. Preus III, was a professor at Concordia Seminary and served as president of Concordia University in Irvine, California. His cousin David W. Preus served as president/presiding bishop of the American Lutheran Church from 1973 to 1988.

== See also ==
- Christian Keyser Preus (1852 - 1921)
- Ove J. H. Preus (1880 – 1951)

Religious titles
Preceded by Oliver Harms	President; Lutheran Church–Missouri Synod; 1969–1981	Succeeded by Ralph A. Bohlmann
