= J. A. O. Preus III =

American academic administrator (1953–2022)

Jacob Aall Ottesen Preus III (March 20, 1953 – August 4, 2022) was an American preacher and academic administrator who was the president of Concordia University, Irvine from 1998 to 2009. Previously, he was a professor at Concordia Seminary in St. Louis, Missouri. On September 23, 2009, he resigned as the university president to become the executive vice president of Mission Advancement for Bethesda Lutheran Communities in Watertown, Wisconsin.

== Early life ==
Preus was born in Minnesota to the Rev. Dr. J.A.O. Preus II and his wife Delpha Mae Holleque.

== Education ==
Preus studied Spanish and American studies and graduated from the University of Missouri in 1975. He received his Master of Divinity (1980), Master of Sacred Theology (1986), and Doctor of Theology (1986), from Concordia Seminary in Clayton, Missouri, a suburb of St. Louis.

== Career ==
Upon graduation from the seminary, he was ordained in the Lutheran Church–Missouri Synod (LCMS) and served congregations in St. Louis and Rancho Palos Verdes, California. He also served as a chaplain in the U.S. Marine Corps Reserve and was assigned to the 3rd Battalion, 24th Regiment of the U.S. Marine Corps during the First Gulf War in 1990–91.

Preus became a professor of systematic theology at Concordia Seminary and served in that position and as dean of the faculty until 1998, when he became president of Concordia University in Irvine, California. During his tenure at the university, the School of Theology was established in 1999, the School of Business in 2002, and the School of Adult Studies (later renamed the School of Professional Studies) in 2005. Robert Alan Grimm Hall and the Chi Rho, and Chi Sigma residence halls were constructed during his presidency.

He retired from the university presidency in 2009 and went on to serve as the executive vice President for Mission Advancement at Bethesda Lutheran Communities until 2014. He subsequently served as North American Liaison for Fundación Educacional Concórdia.

== Personal life and death ==
Preus and his wife Sherry had three children. His father, J. A. O. Preus II, was the eighth president of the LCMS and drew fame for his role in the church schism of the 1970s known as Seminex. His grandfather, J. A. O. Preus, was a politician who served as Minnesota's eighth state auditor and 20th governor. His extended family has been prominent in American Lutheranism, especially within the LCMS. His son Jack Preus IV is a teacher and sports coach.

He died on August 4, 2022, at the age of 69.

== See also ==
- Herman Amberg Preus (1825–1894)
- Robert Preus (1924–1995)
- Christian Keyser Preus (1852–1921)
- Ove J. H. Preus (1880–1951)
- David W. Preus (1922–2021)
