= Christian Keyser Preus =

American Lutheran minister

Christian Keyser Preus (October 13, 1852 – May 28, 1921) was an American Lutheran minister who served as the second president of Luther College in Decorah, Iowa.

== Career ==
Preus was born in the Spring Prairie, Wisconsin, parsonage to Norwegian immigrants Herman Amberg Preus and Caroline (Linka) Keyser Preus. He enrolled in Luther College in 1865, but had to withdraw due to contracting typhoid fever. He resumed his studies in 1868 and graduated in 1873. He then attended Concordia Seminary in St. Louis, Missouri, graduating in 1876.

Preus was ordained that same year and served with his father at the historic Spring Prairie Lutheran Church. Between 1893 and 1895, he also served Our Saviour's congregation in Chicago, Illinois.

In the summer 1897, health problems resulted in his relocating to Decorah. In 1898, he became an instructor of religion and Norwegian in the preparatory department of Luther College.

In 1902, Preus became president of Luther College and served until his death in 1921. While president he continued to teach religion, Norwegian, and Latin. During his administration, in 1915, the college gained accreditation by the North Central Association of Colleges and Secondary Schools.

Preus was a charter member and the first Iowa District president of the Choral Union of the Norwegian Synod, which was organized in 1903. In addition, he was vice-president of the Norwegian Synod from 1911 until that synod's merger into the Norwegian Lutheran Church of America in 1917, and then vice-president of the Iowa District of the new synod until his death. He was also president of the Winneshiek County Old Settlers' Association in 1913 and the first president of the Educational Association of the Norwegian Lutheran Church of America.

Preus died on May 21, 1921. His personal papers and records are maintained in the Luther College Archives. His son, Ove Jacob Hjort Preus, served as president of two colleges, Augustana College in South Dakota and Luther College, serving as Luther's fourth president from 1932 to 1948.

== Selected works ==
- Hvilken Retning og Mod Hvilket Maal Bor Luther College Udvikles for Bedst at Tjene Synoden? (Decorah, IA: Lutheran Publishing House, 1904) Norwegian

== See also ==
- Robert Preus (1924–1995)
- Ove J. H. Preus (1880–1951)
- J. A. O. Preus (1883–1961)
- J. A. O. Preus II (1920–1994)
- J. A. O. Preus III (born 1953)
- David W. Preus (1922–2021)

== Other sources ==
- Luther College Faculty, Luther College Through Sixty Years, 1861-1921 (Minneapolis, MN: Augsburg Publishing House, 1922)
- Nelson, David Theodore, Luther College, 1861-1961 (Decorah, IA: Luther College Press, 1961)

== Other readings ==
- Tingelstad, Oscar Adolf and Olaf M. Norlie Christian Keyser Preus, 1852-1921 (Augsburg Publishing Co. Minneapolis: 1922) Norwegian
