= J. A. O. Preus =

American politician (1883–1961)

Jacob Aall Ottesen Preus
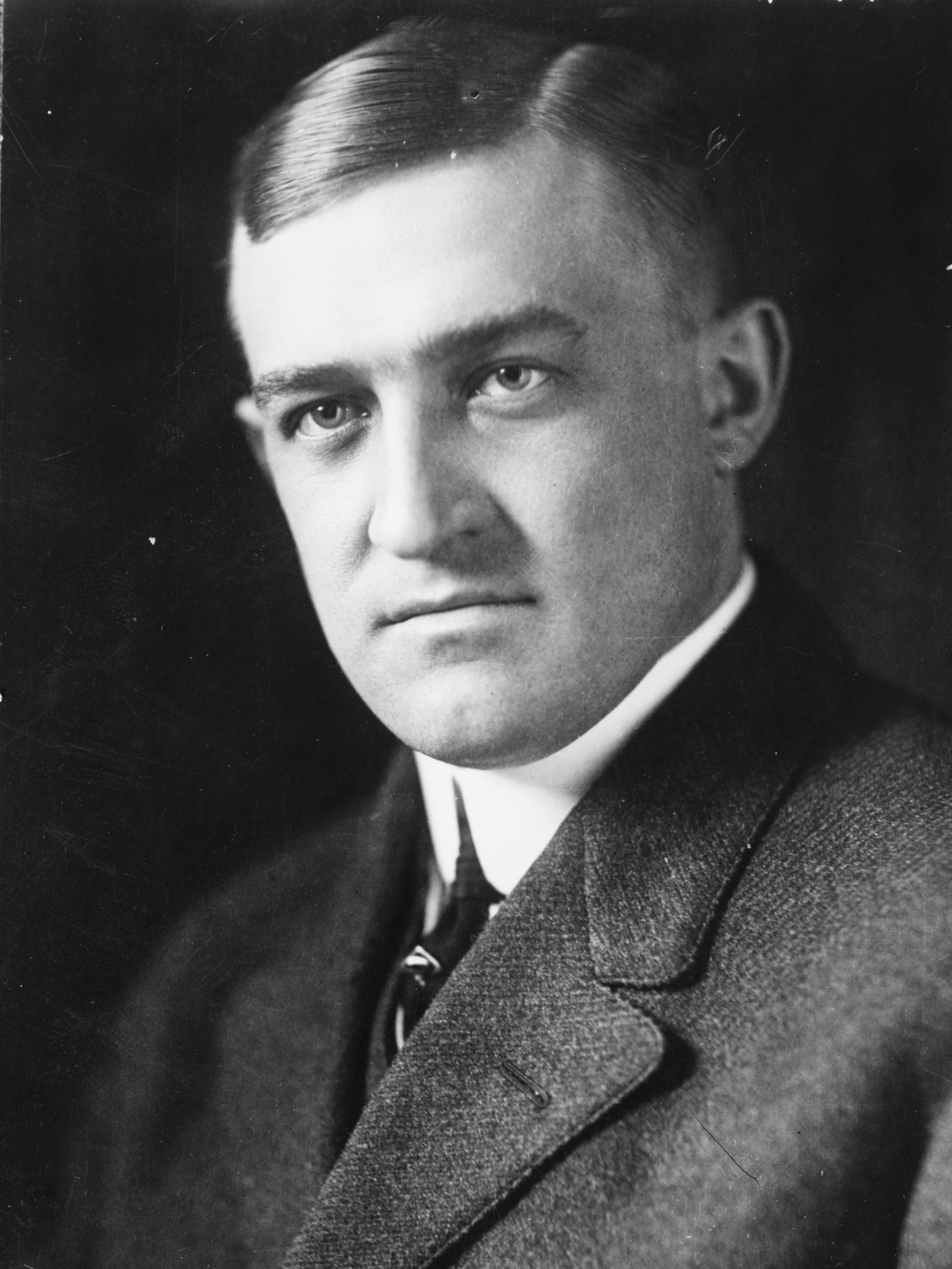
- Preus in 1915

20th Governor of Minnesota
- In office January 5, 1921 – January 6, 1925
- Lieutenant: Louis L. Collins
- Preceded by: Joseph A. A. Burnquist
- Succeeded by: Theodore Christianson

8th Auditor of Minnesota
- In office January 5, 1915 – January 5, 1921
- Governor: Winfield S. Hammond; J. A. A. Burnquist
- Preceded by: Samuel G. Iverson
- Succeeded by: Ray P. Chase

Personal details
- Born: August 28, 1883 Columbia County, Wisconsin, U.S.
- Died: May 24, 1961 (aged 77) Minneapolis, Minnesota, U.S.
- Party: Republican
- Spouse: Idelle Louise Haugen
- Education: Luther College; University of Minnesota

Jacob Aall Ottesen Preus (/prɔɪs/ PROYSS; August 28, 1883 – May 24, 1961) was an American politician. He served as the eighth state auditor of Minnesota from January 5, 1915, to January 5, 1921, and as the 20th governor of Minnesota from January 5, 1921, to January 6, 1925. He was a Republican.

== Background ==
He was born in Columbia County, Wisconsin, on August 28, 1883, of Norwegian descent. The grandson, son, father, grandfather, and great-grandfather of Lutheran pastors, he chose to serve the state rather than the church. He was a 1903 graduate of Luther College in Decorah, Iowa, where his extended family has had a key role in the development, governance, and academic life of the college-community since its founding in 1862.

As a recent graduate of the University of Minnesota Law School he cut his political teeth in Washington as executive clerk to Senator Knute Nelson. Back home after three years, he continued his climb up the Republican ladder of state service toward the governor's office.

== Career ==
When Preus first ran for governor in 1920, he adamantly opposed the Farmer-Labor Party, a coalition of discontented farmers and laborers who had formed a new political organization. The party, he declaimed, represented "socialism—a political cult that would destroy the principles of private property, our religion, and our homes." Preus would be successful among independents, who were the deciding demographic in the election. This was the first time a gubernatorial in Minnesota would be decided by independents. On October 21, 1920, William J. Mayo, a Democrat, endorsed Preus.

Despite his reservations about the Farmer-Labor philosophy, Governor Preus nonetheless encouraged the legislature to meet some of the farmers' demands by broadening cooperatives' legal powers, making low-interest loans available through the Rural Credit Bureau, and creating the Department of Agriculture. Preus also demanded higher taxes from the owners of ore-rich mines on the Iron Range, expanded highway construction, and improved equal rights and election procedures. His political savvy, combined with an apparent desire to correct inequities, made him a surprisingly prolific reformer.

After completing his second term, Preus became an insurance executive in Chicago. He returned to Minneapolis in 1958 and served until his death as board chairman of Lutheran Brotherhood, a fraternal insurance society he had co-founded in 1917. Lutheran Brotherhood merged with Aid Association for Lutherans in 2002 to become Thrivent Financial for Lutherans.

== Personal life ==
Preus was married during 1909 to Idella Louise Haugen. Their son, Jacob Aall Ottesen Preus II, was a theologian, professor, author, and president of the Lutheran Church–Missouri Synod. Their other son, Robert Preus, was a Lutheran pastor, professor, author, theologian, and president of Concordia Theological Seminary. He died on May 24, 1961.

== Electoral history ==
=== 1914 ===
1914 Minnesota State Auditor election
Party	Candidate	Votes	%
Republican	Jacob A.O. (J.A.O.) Preus	181,198	57.13
Democratic	Andrew J. Rush	92,133	29.05
Socialist	Timothy (T.A.) Thompson	30,291	9.55
Progressive	Will Curtis	13,556	4.27
Total votes		317,178	100.00
Republican hold			

=== 1918 ===
1918 Minnesota State Auditor election
Party	Candidate	Votes	%
Republican	Jacob A.O. (J.A.O.) Preus (incumbent)	214,278	62.77
Democratic	Larke (L.W.) Huntley	89,433	26.20
National	Fremont R. McManigal	37,657	11.03
Total votes		341,368	100.00
Republican hold			

=== 1920 ===
Republican Party of Minnesota primary results
Party	Candidate	Votes	%
Republican	J. A. O. Preus	133,832	43.55%
Republican	Henrik Shipstead	125,861	40.96%
Republican	Thomas Frankson	27,421	8.92%
Republican	Franklin F. Ellsworth	7,754	2.52%
Republican	Samuel G. Iverson	7,383	2.40%
Republican	Thomas Keefe	5,060	1.65%
Total votes		195,202	100%

1920 Gubernatorial Election, Minnesota
Party	Candidate	Votes	%	±%
Republican	J. A. O. Preus	415,805	53.06%	+10.33%
Independent	Henrik Shipstead	281,402	35.91%	n/a
Democratic	Laurence C. Hodgson	81,293	10.37%	−9.33%
Socialist	Peter J. Sampson	5,124	0.65%	−1.35%
Majority		134,403	17.15%	
Turnout		783,624		
Republican hold		Swing		

=== 1922 ===
1922 Gubernatorial Election, Minnesota
Party	Candidate	Votes	%	±%
Republican	J. A. O. Preus (incumbent)	309,756	45.21%	−7.85%
Farmer–Labor	Magnus Johnson	295,479	43.13%	n/a
Democratic	Edward Indrehus	79,903	11.66%	+1.29%
Majority		14,277	2.08%	
Turnout		685,138		
Republican hold		Swing		

== See also ==
- Herman Amberg Preus (1825–1894)
- Christian Keyser Preus (1852–1921)
- Ove J. H. Preus (1880–1951)
- J. A. O. Preus III (1953–2022)
- David W. Preus (1922–2021)

Party political offices
Preceded by Samuel G. Iverson	Republican nominee for Minnesota State Auditor; 1914, 1918	Succeeded by Ray P. Chase
Preceded by Joseph A. A. Burnquist	Republican nominee for Governor of Minnesota; 1920, 1922	Succeeded by Theodore Christianson
Preceded by Knute Nelson	Republican nominee for U.S. Senator from Minnesota (Class 2); 1923	Succeeded by Thomas D. Schall
Political offices
Preceded by Joseph A. A. Burnquist	Governor of Minnesota; 1921–1925	Succeeded by Theodore Christianson
Preceded by Samuel G. Iverson	Minnesota State Auditor; 1915–1921	Succeeded by Ray P. Chase
