= Herman Amberg Preus =

American Lutheran author and clergyman (1825–1894)

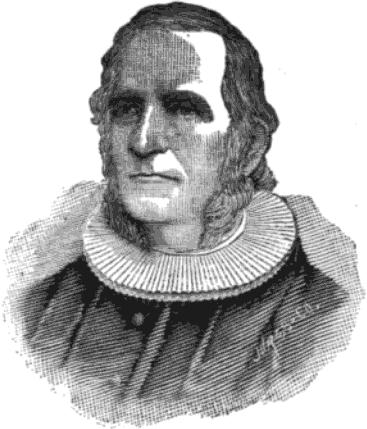
- Herman Amberg Preus
- Born: June 25, 1825; Kristiansand, Sweden-Norway
- Died: July 2, 1894 (aged 69); Lee, Illinois
- Education: University of Oslo, Norway
- Occupation: denominational president
- Spouse: Caroline Keyser
- Parent: Paul Arctander Preus
- Religion: Evangelical Lutheran (Church of Norway, Norwegian Synod)
- Ordained: 1848
- Offices held: President of the Synod of the Norwegian Evangelical Lutheran Church in America (1862–1894)

Herman Amberg Preus (June 16, 1825 – July 2, 1894) was an American neo-Lutheran author, clergyman, and church leader. Ordained in 1848, he became a key figure in organizing the Norwegian Synod.

== Background ==
Herman Amberg Preus was born in Kristiansand, Norway. His grandfather was Johan Keyser, the Bishop of Kristiansand in the Church of Norway. Herman attended the Cathedral School in Kristiansand. He was educated in Christian theology, graduating from the University of Oslo in Oslo in 1848. The same year he was ordained an Evangelical Lutheran pastor by the bishops of the Church of Norway.

== Career ==
In May 1851, Preus and Caroline Keyser were married, and they immigrated to the United States the same year.

Preus died at his daughter's home in Lee, Illinois, in 1894.

== Absolution and election controversies ==
In 1874, the Norwegian Synod received charges of teaching universalism from Professors A. Weenaas and Sven Oftedahl. Preus, president of the Norwegian Synod at that time, presented an essay in response to their claims. Among their claims was that a minister may not absolve a sinner with certainty because he does not know the sinner's faith. In response to these claims, Preus defended the doctrine of objective justification. In particular, he wrote:

"According to his new gospel the professor must preach that through his suffering and death Christ has only accomplished so much that God has now become willing to let his wrath cease and to be reconciled and to loose, confer grace, forgive, justify and open access to salvation, but that in actuality he can only do and does all this if man on his part fulfills the condition placed on him by God, namely that he is supposed to believe. And the thing which is thus supposed to be believed does not become this that God already has done this and is reconciled but that God will do it and will be reconciled when he sees the obedience and the good quality in man, that he believes."

The pastor does not know the sinner’s faith; besides God, only the individual truly knows his own faith. Preus agreed with this statement; however, when added to the premise that Christ's death brought justification only for those who believe in Him, the pastor would not be able to absolve the sins of anyone. Thus the issue at hand was that of objective justification or universal atonement (Unlimited Atonement). Did Christ's death bring justification to all people? Preus argued that it did. He held the doctrine of objective justification and God's promise in His Word to be the certainty of faith. He did not hold that the fruits of faith gave you confidence of legitimacy of your own faith; rather, fruits of faith, i.e. good works toward neighbor and confessing Christ before men, are only for the sake of helping your neighbor, thus proving to him—not to yourself—that you have faith. Preus believed that faith is certainly necessary for salvation, but even that is given to us by God through his Word, as it is confessed in Article V of the Augsburg Confession of 1530, the prime doctrinal document of Evangelical Lutheran belief contained in the Book of Concord of 1580. Therefore, he held that a Christian can only look to God's Word and its promise of Christ's Vicarious Atonement on the cross for all mankind; if the Christian looks at the fruits of his faith for confidence, he only ends up looking at himself and away from Christ. Preus also pointed out that the unfaithfulness of the sinner does not cause God's absolution to be unfaithful, appealing to Romans 3:3: "For what if some did not believe? Shall their unbelief make the faith of God without effect? God forbid." Thus Preus held that a pastor can forgive in Christ's stead the sins of those who confess their sins even if he can not see the heart of the one confessing.

The Norwegian Synod was a member of the conservative Synodical Conference, a church denominational confederation. The absolution controversy preceded the controversy on Election in the 1880s, of which the Lutheran Church – Missouri Synod was also a member. Herman Amberg Preus and his son, Christian Keyser Preus, were pastors together in the same Wisconsin parish when the election controversy erupted. The opposing side was teaching that God predestined His saints for salvation in view of their faith in Christ (intuitu fidei). Preus and others, including C. F. W. Walther, one of the leading founders and first president of the theologically conservative Missouri Synod, took the position that the only cause that moved God to elect saints unto salvation is grace, and that election or predestination of saints to salvation is not the same as God's foreknowledge. The Missourians were looked at as the leaders in the election controversy. When Preus and the other Norwegians supported the same position as Walther and Missouri, they were accused of loyalism to the Missouri Synod. The controversy became so fierce in the circles of the Norwegian Synod that on Good Friday, 1883, Herman and Christian were physically removed from their congregations. The Anti-Missourian Brotherhood, a group within the Norwegian Synod, had engineered their removal. They were later received back to their parish after most of the people were convinced of the correctness of Preus's position on election.
