= Rolf Knierim =

German-American theologian (1928–2018)

Rolf P. Knierim
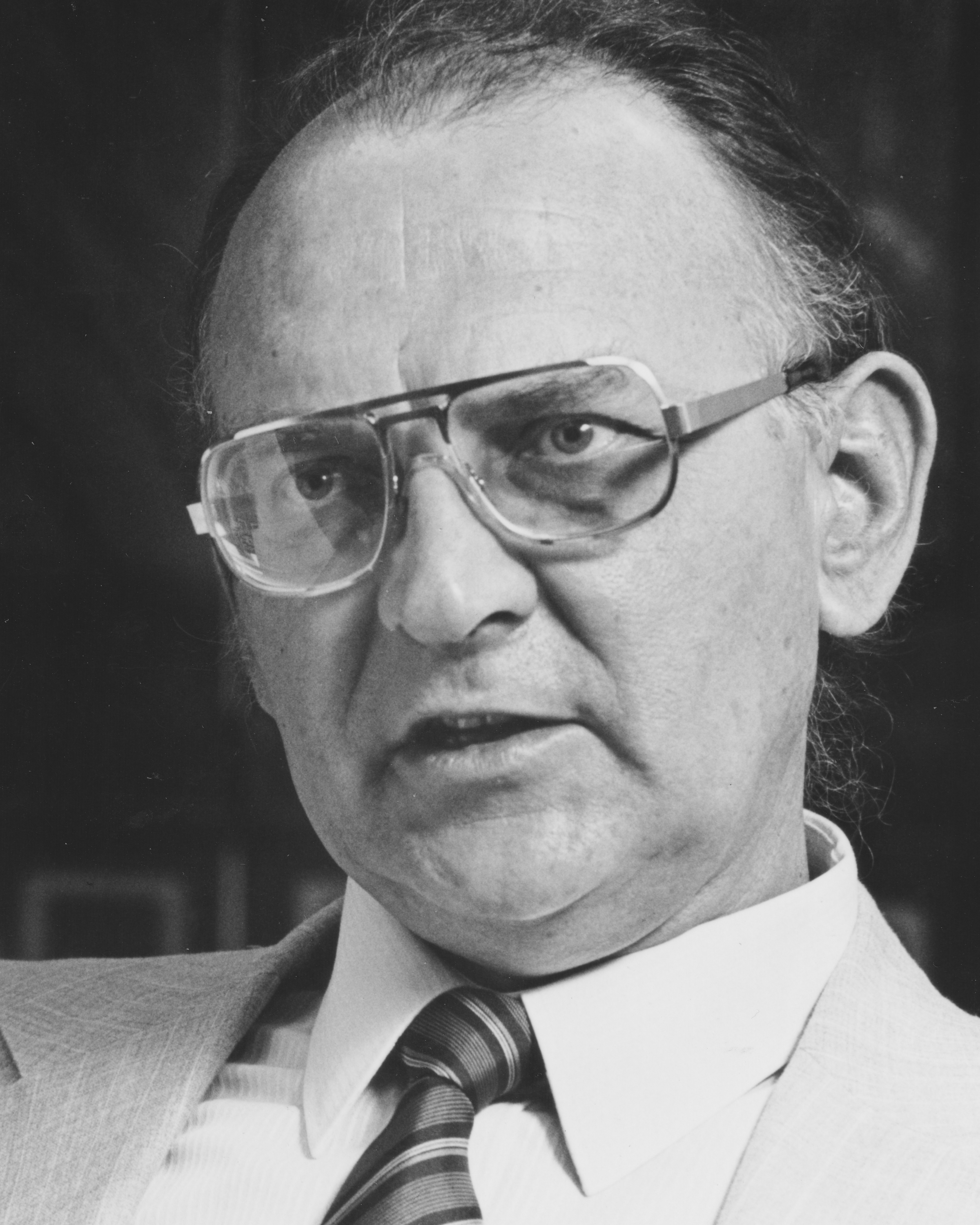
- Born: July 8, 1928; Pirmasens, Germany
- Died: September 29, 2018 (aged 90) near Winslow, Arizona, United States
- Known for: form criticism systematic methodology for Old Testament Theology
- Title: Avery Professor of Religion; Professor of Old Testament; Ordained Elder

Academic background
- Education: University of Heidelberg
- Thesis: 'Die Hauptbegriffe für Sünde im Alten Testament' (1965)
- Doctoral advisor: Gerhard von Rad

Academic work
- Era: 20th century
- Discipline: Old Testament scholar Old Testament theologian Biblical scholar
- Institutions: University of Heidelberg; Claremont Graduate University; Claremont School of Theology; United Methodist Church
- Notable works: • The Task of Old Testament Theology : Substance, Method, and Cases. Grand Rapids, Mich: William B. Eerdmans, 1995. ISBN 9780802807151 • “Old Testament Form Criticism Reconsidered” Interpretation 27 (1973): 435-468.

Rolf Paul Knierim (8 July 1928 – 29 September 2018) was a German American theologian and biblical scholar who specialized in the research of the Old Testament. He was a tenured Professor of Old Testament at the Claremont School of Theology and Avery Professor of Religion at Claremont Graduate University.

Knierim was a founding research project director at Claremont Graduate University's internationally esteemed Institute for Antiquity and Christianity, where he initiated and led the Old Testament Form-Critical Project, which produced the Institute's longest-running and most prolific publication series, the Forms of the Old Testament Literature (FOTL) Series.

In 1997, a Festschrift was published in Knierim's honor entitled, Problems in Biblical Theology: Essays in Honor of Rolf Knierim, which included contributions from scholars such as Klaus Koch, Wolfhart Pannenberg, Rolf Rendtorff, James A. Sanders, and Claus Westermann. Once a student of Gerhard von Rad and a former faculty member at the University of Heidelberg, Knierim's most noted scholarly contributions have been his influential role in fostering the global expansion and development of the discipline of form criticism and his methodological proposal that the task of Old Testament theology is by necessity a systematic one, a proposal he vigorously advanced in his seminal 1984 essay, “The Task of Old Testament Theology,” and in his more expansive 1995 multi-essay tome, The Task of Old Testament Theology: Substance, Method, and Cases.

== Life, education, and work ==
Knierim was born in Pirmasens, Germany to parents Gottfried Knierim, a shoe factory worker, and Luise Knierim, née Buchmann. Knierim grew up in a family household deeply involved in the communal life of their local Methodist congregation, where his paternal grandmother had been a founding member. At the age of ten, Knierim signed up for school at the local Humanistisches Gymnasium, the classical high school in Pirmasens, where he received training in the reading of the classics, the study of Greek and Latin, and early exposure to the dialogue between humanistic pursuits and Christian thought.

In December 1943, the studies of 15-year-old Knierim at the Pirmasens Humanistisches Gymnasium were interrupted when, during World War II, Knierim was forcibly conscripted with his class into the German military and he was assigned to service as an air defense artillerist (Luftwaffenhelfer). In his essay "On the Subject of War in Old Testament and Biblical Theology," originally published in German, Knierim describes the experience of his own forcible conscription into the German military, alongside the parallel experience of his friend and fellow Old Testament scholar, Hans Eberhard von Waldow, stating that, “These experiences, followed by the impact of the Holocaust, or Shoah, profoundly influenced the direction of our lives, including our commitment to Old Testament studies.”

In March 1945, after a war-battered Pirmasens had undergone severe structural damage and numerous casualties among its citizenry, Knierim was captured by American forces, interrogated, but then sent home. In the fall of 1946, area schools reopened. Surviving years of hunger pervasive in the still war-involved region at the time, Knierim completed his schooling at the Pirmasens Humanistisches Gymnasium, and passed final exams, earning his diploma in the summer of 1948.

Soon after receiving his diploma, Knierim left Pirmasens to pursue training for church ministry, and subsequently received a pastoral assignment and was stationed at Pforzheim, Germany. At the age of 21, after completing two years at Marbur/Lahn-Wetzlar in central Germany, Knierim went on to receive further training at the Methodist seminary in Frankfurt/Main.

In 1951, Knierim moved to Heidelberg, Germany to continue his studies at the University of Heidelberg. In Heidelberg, Knierim shared a room with Manfred Hoffmann, who went on to later become professor of church history at the Candler School of Theology, Emory University in Atlanta, Georgia. While at Heidelberg, Knierim interacted with prominent scholars, including: Gerhard von Rad, Gunther Bornkamm, Heinrich Bornkamm, Hans Freiherr von Campenhausen, Edmund Schlink, and Peter Brunner. Knierim studied at the University of Heidelberg under the tutelage of Old Testament scholar, Gerhard von Rad. On May 7, 1955, Knierim passed his comprehensive exams at the University of Heidelberg.

On June 2, 1955, Knierim married Hildegard Salm in Edenkoben, Germany. Twenty years earlier, Rolf and Hildegard had met as students in the same class of first and second graders and had walked home together daily after school.

In July 1955, the couple moved into an apartment atop the chapel at Eutingen where Knierim had been assigned for his first year as a pastor to serve the three villages of Eutingen, Öschelbronn, and Wurmberg, Germany. While there, Knierim published a reflection in the church newsletter addressing his congregation entitled, "Biblishes Denken" [biblical thinking], a piece he mentions in the foreword of his 1995 book, The Task of Old Testament Theology: Substance, Method, and Cases. There, years later in the opening of the 1995 book, one of the culminating works of his career, he noted that although he had become “involved in the scholarly side of the task” in his professional life over the decades that followed his pastoral service, a view had persisted for him through the years, namely that he had ”never believed that biblical thinking is reserved only for the scholars.”

Knierim and his family moved to Saarbrücken in 1956 where he was assigned a small congregation to pastor, and he worked on his doctoral dissertation at the invitation of Gerhard von Rad, his mentor. In 1957, Knierim was ordained as an Elder of the Methodist church at the annual conference at Pirmasens, and he obtained his Dr. Theologiae,. Soon thereafter, Knierim received a postcard from Gerhard von Rad wherein von Rad offered him a university position, and effectively “changed the direction of Rolf’s career from the practical field of ministry in the German Methodist Church to the academic field of teaching the Old Testament at the University of Heidelberg.”

While at Heidelberg, Knierim served in a range of roles as a pastor, hospital chaplain, assistant to Claus Westermann and Gerhard von Rad, Privatdozent teaching Hebrew and seminars for beginning students, and an Old Testament faculty member.

In 1963, Knierim earned his Habilitation at the University of Heidelberg. In 1964-65, Knierim was invited to serve as visiting professor at the Claremont School of Theology in Claremont, California. Knierim was then offered a dual professorship at the Claremont School of Theology and Claremont Graduate School in Claremont, California, which he accepted.

In 1966, Knierim joined the faculty of the Claremont School of Theology as Professor or Old Testament and the faculty of Claremont Graduate School (now Claremont Graduate University) as Professor of Religion. Over the course of his work as a professor at Claremont, Knierim supervised over 30 doctoral students to the completion of their PhD dissertations and served as an adviser to numerous MA students.

At Claremont, Knierim was a founding project director at the Institute for Antiquity and Christianity (IAC), initiating the Old Testament Form-Critical Project, and formally chartering the Forms of Old Testament Literature (FOTL) series with Gene Tucker in the spring of 1966. In November 1967, Knierim participated in the organizational meeting of the IAC Research Council, alongside five others: William H. Brownlee, James M. Robinson, IAC founder; Ernest Cadman Colwell, first director of the IAC; Hans Dieter Betz, and Loren R. Fisher. Knierim continued as IAC project co-director with Gene Tucker, and later through his retirement with Marvin A. Sweeney.

In 1997, a Festschrift was published in Knierim's honor, Problems in Biblical Theology: Essays in Honor of Rolf Knierim. Knierim's Festschrift included contributions from scholars such as Klaus Koch, Wolfhart Pannenberg, Rolf Rendtorff, James A. Sanders, and Claus Westermann. Notably contained in the Festschrift's opening pages were two works that offered rare insights into the larger historical and biographical context of Knierim's work: the book's foreword by James M. Robinson, and the detailed factual biographical narrative authored by Hildegard Knierim containing material spanning a timeframe of over five decades, and having as its setting Claremont, California and key locales in Germany, Knierim's country of origin.

After his retirement from his post as a professor at Claremont, Knierim continued to contribute to ongoing discourse in the fields of Biblical and Old Testament studies. On November 22, 1997, at the annual meeting of the Society of Biblical Literature in San Francisco, California, a panel of leading Biblical scholars convened to engage in a discussion with Knierim concerning his landmark 1995 book, The Task of Old Testament Theology: Substance, Methods, and Cases. In 2005, Knierim co-authored with George W. Coats, Numbers, volume IV of the Forms of the Old Testament Literature series, one of the last volumes of the series.

On September 29, 2018, Knierim and his wife, Hildegard, were killed in a car accident near Winslow, Arizona while returning home to Claremont from a vacation in New Mexico.

== Contributions and scholarly impact ==
=== Form criticism ===
As a former student of Gerhard von Rad, a noted German scholar of the form-critical method, Knierim was regarded as being especially well-positioned to bring continental formgeschichte to the United States. Knierim's establishment of the Old Testament Form-Critical Project represented a key step in the establishment of form criticism as a leading exegetical methodology in 20th-century American and international biblical scholarship. Enlisting a global team of researchers, the Forms of the Old Testament Literature (FOTL) series carried forth the form-critical discipline developed over several generations by German biblical scholars as its volumes also evidenced new developments, for instance a departure from a characteristic pre-World War II exegetical focus preoccupied nearly exclusively with diachronic concerns, to a more synchronic one, moving the field well beyond its previously prioritized analytic parameters.

In describing the reasoning behind the establishment of the Old Testament Form-Critical Project, Knierim revealed that the project had been founded "in order to make it possible to establish the field of form-critical research on the Hebrew Bible as an exegetical discipline in its own right besides the exegetical disciplines practiced at the time in the United States and the English-speaking world." On the centrality of the Forms of the Old Testament Literature (FOTL) series, the signature publication of the Project, written by an international team of Old Testament scholars assembled and coordinated for over four decades by Knierim with series co-editor Gene Tucker, and later with co-editor Marvin A. Sweeney, James M. Robinson remarked that “the ongoing dialogue among its [FOTL] editors has become de facto the center of Old Testament form-critical theological scholarship in America.”

Knierim's impact on the development of form criticism was exerted not only through his leadership of the Old Testament Form-Critical Project and his editorial guidance of its signature publications, the volumes of the Forms of the Old Testament Literature Series, but also in the ripples of scholarly discussion set in motion by his landmark 1973 journal article, “Old Testament Form Criticism Reconsidered.” The essay was later described by Sweeney as representing “more or less of a coming of age of form-critical theory in that it moved well beyond past conceptualizations of the method.” Sweeney went on to say that “Knierim recognizes biblical texts as literary entities that are formed in the context of a societal or life setting in which typical sociolinguistic forms of expression function and convey meaning.” Similarly, David L. Petersen saw in the article the pivotal suggestion of the reformulation of form-critical programmatic consensus up to that point, consensus that had been “built on the foundations” going back to Hermann Gunkel.

=== Old Testament theology as a systematic task ===
Remarking on Knierim and his signature approach to biblical research, Jeffrey Kuan, Claremont School of Theology president, said of Knierim that “his passion and commitment to the scientific study of the Bible was absolutely unwavering.” Knierim's scientific approach to Biblical Studies was perhaps most clearly evidenced in his firmly-held conceptualization of Old Testament theology as necessarily systematic and his hopes, albeit cautiously guarded ones, for the shape of future scholarly explorations of Old Testament theology.

In his essay, “Comments on the Task of Old Testament Theology,” Knieirm discussed the essential contours of his methodological approach, explaining that the main points “revolve above all around the issues of diversity, the systematization of the diverse theologies by comparison and their relativity to each other, the relationship of text and concept in the individual tests, and Old Testament theology as a genre sui generis.”

Ben C. Ollenburger noted that Knierim's assertion that the task of Old Testament theology is a systematic one was shocking and quite a step forward on a distinctive course of exploration. Old Testament lecturer Katrina Larkin offered a similar assessment of Knierim's programmatic proposal, positing that applying it would “be massive and involve the reconceptualization of basic interpretive paradigms.”

In his “A Posteriori Explorations” toward the end of ‘‘The Task of Old Testament Theology,’’ Knierim reflected soberly on the plausibility of the realization of a particular “utopian” dream, saying that “It is not inconceivable that someday, if not an individual, a team of like-minded Old Testament scholars will organize a comprehensive Old Testament theology using methods similar to those by which research projects in the modern sciences are organized. Such a project is, to my knowledge, currently not on the horizon.”

=== Substance criticism ===
Knieirm identified what he termed substance criticism as a driving concern for his methodology, discussing it in the context of his essay, “On the Contours of Old Testament and Biblical Hamartiology” and in his essay, “On Gabler.” In “On the Contours of Old Testament and Biblical Hamartiology,” Knierim explores the question of a method for a biblical hamartiology. In the section entitled “Substance Criticism,” Knierim states that “the biblical texts not only narrate, describe, and prescribe. They also qualify.” (p. 422). In “On Gabler,” Knierim asserts that “the task of Old Testament theology, as of any theology, is constituted by the substance-critical approach.” He elaborated in the associated note that, “Standardized expressions for the German Sachkritik and sachkritish do not — yet — exist in English. What is meant by these German terms is the substance of the problem at issue in a text, idea, concept, etc. Therefore, I am using the expressions “substance criticism” and “substance-critical” in the just-mentioned sense. After all, the root meaning of the word “substance” is: a stance under something. Sachkritik aims at discussing that “stance.” (p. 495)

Simon J. DeVries noted that with the German term ‘’Sachkritik’’, Knierim’s usage had meant “that in the final analysis, the consideration that gives validity and authority to Bible interpretation is whether it is ‘’sachlich’’, by which he means appropriate and effective in a realistic and personal way. This requires that the Old Testament be interviewed first of all for its actual, ostensible meaning within its ancient context, and only then put to analogous use in addressing the problems of contemporary human life.”

=== Doktorvater ===
Knierim did his role of Doktorvater. Over the course of his professorship at Claremont, Knierim supervised over 30 doctoral dissertations and many master's degree theses.

A few of Knierim's doctoral dissertation advisees included: Kent Harold Richards, SBL Executive Director Emeritus, Antony F. Campbell, George Blankenbaker, Marvin A. Sweeney, Yoshihide Suzuki, recipient of the 1990 Japan Academy Prize for his dissertation-based work, "A Philological Study of Deuteronomy," and Mignon R. Jacobs, Dean and Professor of Old Testament at Ashland Theological Seminary.

Two dissertations completed by Knierim doctoral advisees featured discussions that specifically treated the place of Knierim's work in the development of the disciplines of biblical criticism in general, and form criticism, exegetical methodology, Old Testament theology and hermeneutics in particular: David Bruce Palmer's Text and Concept in Exodus 1:1-2:25: A Case Study in Exegetical Method, and Wonil Kim's Toward a Substance-Critical Task of Old Testament Theology.

In Text and Concept in Exodus 1:1-2:25: A Case Study in Exegetical Method, Palmer explained that "Knierim has contributed to the ferment of discussion and proposals for refinements and methodological innovations relative to form-critical methodology. This is clear first in Knierim’s interaction with the impact of structuralism and structural linguistics upon form-critical method. His developments in this regard have stood alongside those of Richter. Koch, and Hardmeier and others who have in one way or another effected newer developments in form criticism emerging from the mid-twentieth century onward...The emphasis on concept was to be a significant focus on Knierim’s part as a further development along the trajectory which the engagement between form criticism and structural linguistics had propelled methodological refinement."

Palmer went on to address a perceived blindspot in the scope of the conventional understanding of Knierim's research, as he observed that "Many who are familiar with Knierim’s contribution to form-critical research are not aware that this later development moves well beyond the methodology that is expressed, even to this day, in The Forms of the Old Testament Literature commentary series. A subtle shift of focus in Knierim’s own method may be discerned, from a primary focus upon genre and typicality, even when grounded in structure analysis of texts, to a focus upon infratextual conceptual aspects which are more fundamental than the generically typical.”

Knierim invoked Wonil Kim's Toward a Substance-Critical Task of Old Testament Theology as he discussed assessments of his The Task of Old Testament Theology: Substance, Method, and Cases that “correctly” saw in the book and his methodology “a new definition of the task of Old Testament Theology and a new design for doing it,” as he said Kim's dissertation analyzes the book "in the horizon of the history of the discipline from the beginning of the German salvation-history school up to the wide spectrum of recent programs.”

In the dissertation, Kim posited that Knierim's method of Old Testament theology, “takes the plurality of Old Testament theologies as the problematic starting point and proceeds with a substance-critical, systematizing, and normatizing approach.” This development, Kim said, “poses a genuine, new challenge to the descriptive and phenomenological approaches that have dominated the discipline for centuries. Knierim's methodology is cast against the trajectory of OT theology and hermeneutics that has subscribed to one principal interpretive tenet since Pietism and Gabler...Heilsgeschichte as a representative interpretive mode of this trajectory is traced from its Pietistic origin to its full development by von Rad.”

Knierim's approach was thus described by Kim as representing a departure and a paradigmatic shift into a new and decidedly different direction from even his well-known mentor, Gerhard von Rad. Concerning that which was held as central to what Knierim viewed as of the problematic nature of the conceptual plurality of Old Testament texts, Kim homed in, “Plurality in the abstract, conceptual level may be problematic in its own right, but in the configuration of Knierim's methodology the question of unity in conceptual reality and concrete reality are one question. A question of God is a question of the people affected in actu."

== Bibliography ==
=== Works by Knierim ===
- ——— (1960). Entwurf eines methodistischen Selbstverständnisses. Methodismus in Dokumenten. Vol. 9. Zürich: Christliche Vereinsbuchhandlung. OCLC 1125826.
- ——— (1960). Das Vater-unser. Metanoia. Marburg/Lahn: Theologische Arbeitsgemeinschaft der Studentenmission in Deutschland. OCLC 80589735.
- ——— (1962). Bibelautorität und Bibelkritik. Zürich; Frankfurt am Main: Gotthelf-Verlag. OCLC 11105411.
- ——— (1962). Die Botschaft der Bücher Mose und Josua. Gruppenarbeit unter Jugendlichen ueber Bibel un Kirche. Vol. 14. Frankfurt-am-M.: Anker Verlag. OCLC 874426706.
- ——— (1965). Die Hauptbegriffe für Sünde im Alten Testament. Vol. 1. Gütersloh: Mohn. OCLC 263664631.
- ——— (1971). "Offenbarung im Alten Testament". In Wolff, Hans W. (ed.). Probleme biblischer Theologie: Gerhard von Rad zum 70. Geburtstag. München: Kaiser. OCLC 883887655.
- ——— (1973). "Old Testament Form Criticism Reconsidered". Interpretation. 27 (4): 435–468. ISSN 0020-9643.
- ——— (1981). "Cosmos and History in Israel's Theology". Horizons in Biblical Theology. 3: 59–123. doi:10.1163/187122081X00046. ISSN 0195-9085.
- ——— (1984). "The Task of Old Testament Theology". Horizons in Biblical Theology. 6 (1): 25–57. doi:10.1163/187122084X00043. ISSN 0195-9085.
- ——— (1985). "Criticism of Literary Features. Form, Tradition, and Redaction". In Knight, Douglas A.; Tucker, Gene M. (eds.). The Hebrew Bible and its modern interpreters. Philadelphia: Fortress Press. pp. 123–65. ISBN 9780891307846. OCLC 466595138.
- ——— (1985). "Age and Aging in the Old Testament". In Clements, William M. (ed.). Ministry With the Aging: Designs, Challenges, Foundations. Haworth Press. pp. 20–36. ISBN 9780866569347. OCLC 19122641.
- ——— (1995). The Task of Old Testament Theology: Substance, Method, and Cases. Eerdmans. ISBN 9780802807151. OCLC 476343376.
- ———; Coats, George W. (2005). Numbers. The Forms of Old Testament Literature. Vol. IV. Grand Rapids: Eerdmans. ISBN 9780802822314. OCLC 892706375.
- ——— (2010). Text and Concept in Leviticus 1:1-9: A Case in Exegetical Method (2 ed.). Wipf & Stock. ISBN 9781608994168. OCLC 956763611.

=== Works about Knierim ===
- Sun, Henry T. C.; Eades, Keith L., eds. (1997). Problems in Biblical Theology: Essays in Honor of Rolf Knierim. Grand Rapids: Eerdmans. ISBN 9780802838032. OCLC 34919755. (Festschrift)
- Kim, Wonil; Ellens, Deborah L.; Floyd, Michael; Sweeney, Marvin A., eds. (2000). Reading the Hebrew Bible for a New Millennium: Form, Concept, and Theological Perspective, Volume 1: Theological and Hermeneutical Studies. Harrisburg, PA: Trinity Press International. ISBN 9781563383144. OCLC 234079848.
- Kim, Wonil; Ellens, Deborah L.; Floyd, Michael; Sweeney, Marvin A., eds. (2000). Reading the Hebrew Bible for a New Millennium: Form, Concept, and Theological Perspective, Volume 2: Exegetical and Theological Studies. Harrisburg, PA: Trinity Press International. ISBN 9781563383267. OCLC 778826678.

=== Works edited by Knierim ===
==== The Forms of the Old Testament Literature (FOTL) Series ====
Co-editors: Gene M. Tucker (1966 through 1997) and Marvin A. Sweeney (1997 through 2016)

==== Other works edited/co-edited by Knierim ====
- Ellens, J. Harold; Ellens, Deborah L.; Knierim, Rolf P.; Kalimi, Isaac, eds. (2004). God's Word for Our World: Biblical Studies in Honor of Simon John De Vries. Journal for the Study of the Old Testament Supplement series; 389. Vol. I. London: T & T Clark International. ISBN 9780826469748. OCLC 1056589412.
- Ellens, J. Harold; Ellens, Deborah L.; Knierim, Rolf P.; Kalimi, Isaac, eds. (2004). God's Word for Our World: Biblical Studies in Honor of Simon John De Vries. Journal for the Study of the Old Testament Supplement. Vol. 2. London: T & T Clark International. ISBN 9780826469755. OCLC 491616040.
