= James Harold Burtness =

Lutheran Theologian

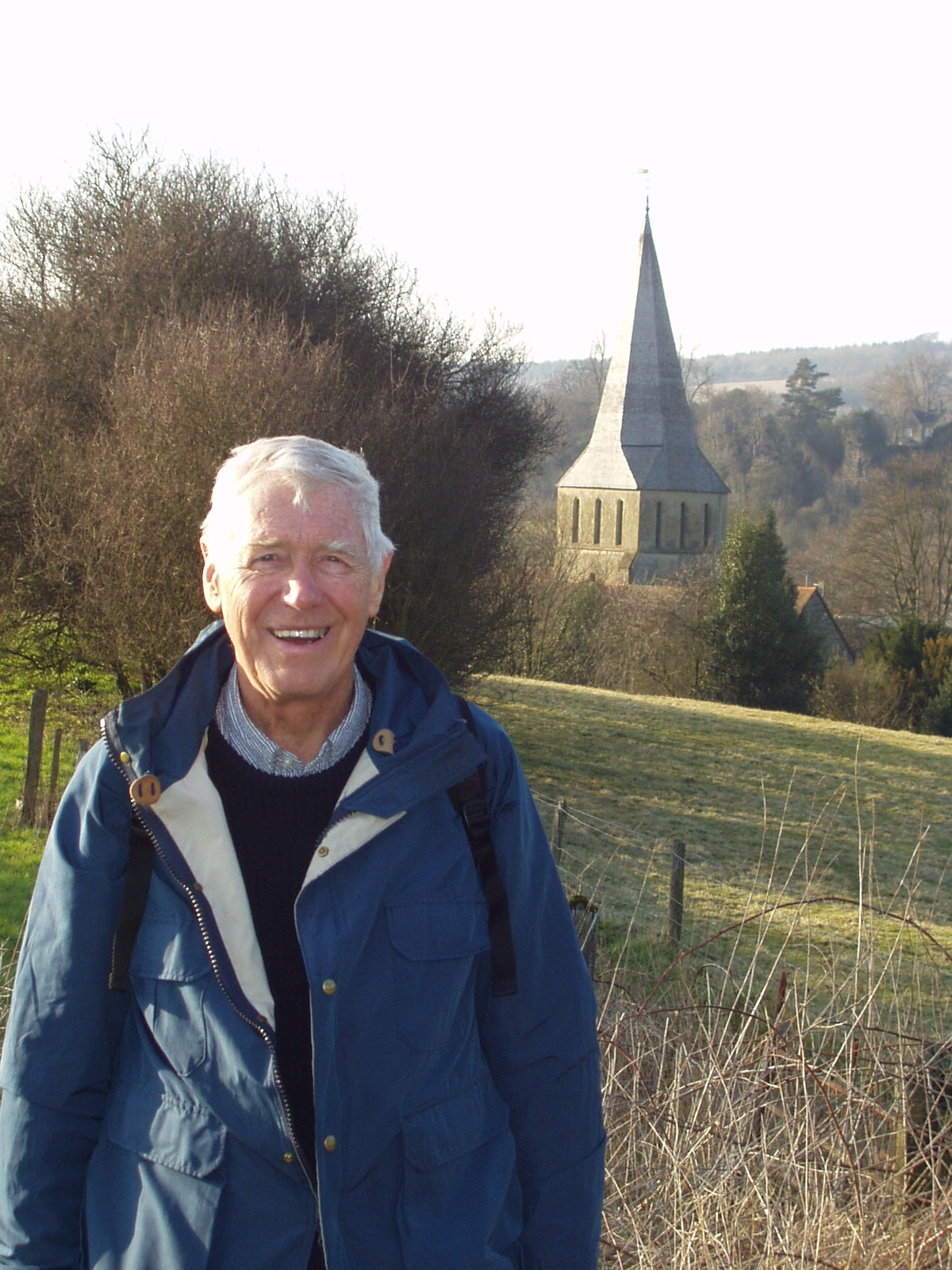
- Burtness in 2003
- Born: May 3, 1928; Chicago, Illinois
- Died: April 10, 2006 (aged 77)
- Occupations: Theologian, Author, Lecturer, Professor
- Employer: Luther Seminary
- Spouse: Dolores Arlene Leiseth (m. 1951)
- Children: 4

James Harold Burtness (May 3, 1928 – April 10, 2006) was an American theologian, author, lecturer, and Professor of Systematic Theology and Ethics at Luther Seminary in St. Paul, Minnesota. He taught Christian ethics at Luther Seminary for over forty years and was known for his scholarship on the German theologian Dietrich Bonhoeffer.

== Early life and education ==
Burtness was born in Chicago, Illinois, on May 3, 1928. He attended St. Olaf College in Northfield, Minnesota, graduating in 1949 with a Bachelor of Arts degree. He then studied at Luther Seminary, where he earned a Bachelor of Theology in 1953 (equivalent to the Master of Divinity). Burtness went on to complete a Doctor of Theology (Th.D.) at Princeton Theological Seminary in 1958. He was ordained as a Lutheran pastor in 1958, the same year he earned his doctorate.

== Academic career ==
In 1955, Burtness joined the faculty of Luther Seminary in St. Paul as an instructor in New Testament Greek and systematic theology. He became an assistant professor in 1960 and was appointed full professor in 1972. Over the course of his career, he taught at Luther Seminary (later known as Luther Northwestern Seminary) for more than four decades, retiring in 1998 as professor emeritus of systematic theology and ethics.

He served as a visiting professor at Gurukul Lutheran Theological College in Madras, India, in 1963–1964, an American Theological Society Fellow at the Free University of Berlin in 1966–1967, and a Lutheran tutor at Mansfield College, Oxford, in 1973–1974.

== Writings and theology ==
Burtness's academic focus was Christian ethics and the theology of Dietrich Bonhoeffer. He contributed numerous articles to theological journals and co-founded dialog, a theological journal, in 1961 alongside Robert Jenson, Roy Harrisville, Kent Knutson, Carl Braaten, and others. In 1963, Burtness edited The New Community in Christ: Essays on the Corporate Christian Life with John P. Kildahl. He continued exploring Christian ethics in Whatever You Do: An Essay on the Christian Life (1967).

Burtness's best-known work, Shaping the Future: The Ethics of Dietrich Bonhoeffer, was published in 1985 by Fortress Press. In it, he interpreted Bonhoeffer's ethical writings—especially how Bonhoeffer's principle of responsible action could shape contemporary Christian moral thought. In 1999 he published Consequences: Morality, Ethics, and the Future, analyzing different forms of Christian moral reasoning and proposing an integrated approach to ethics.

As a Bonhoeffer scholar, Burtness also contributed to the translation of Bonhoeffer's works, including Psalms: The Prayer Book of the Bible, which he translated into English in 1970 for Augsburg Publishing House. He later helped with the English edition of Life Together and Prayerbook of the Bible as part of the Dietrich Bonhoeffer Works series.

== Personal life ==
Burtness was married to Dolores Arlene Leiseth in 1951; they had four children: Stephen (1953–2005), Eric (1955-), Deborah (1958-), and Peter (1960-). Throughout his career, he combined his pastoral duties with scholarship, marching with Martin Luther King Jr. in the 1965 Selma to Montgomery marches and engaging in civil rights and social justice concerns. He observed various historic events, including the 1968 Democratic National Convention protests in Chicago, the fall of the Soviet Union, and the end of apartheid in South Africa.

He died on April 10, 2006, at the age of 77, from injuries sustained in a fall earlier that year.

== Books ==
- All Things Are Yours. Division of College and University Work, National Lutheran Council, 1962.
- Good News: Work Book (with T.J. Vinger). For Board of Parish Education and Board of Publication of the ALC. Minneapolis: Augsburg, 1962.
- The New Community in Christ (edited with John Kildahl). Minneapolis: Augsburg, 1963.
- Whatever You Do. Tower Series. Minneapolis: Augsburg, 1967.
- Shaping the Future: The Ethics of Dietrich Bonhoeffer. Philadelphia: Fortress, 1985.
- Consequences: Morality, Ethics, and the Future. Minneapolis: Fortress, 1999.
