= Anthony Campbell =

Anthony Campbell may refer to:

- Anthony Campbell (American football) (born 2000), American football player
- Anthony Campbell (boxer) (born 1990), American boxer
- Anthony Campbell (cricketer) (born 1950), Jamaican cricketer
- Anthony Campbell (judge) (born 1936), retired Lord Justice of Appeal in Northern Ireland
- Anthony Campbell (physician), retired consultant physician at The Royal London Homeopathic Hospital
- Anthony Alexander Campbell, British rapper and producer better known as Dobie
- Anthony C. Campbell (1853–1932), American attorney and politician
- Anthony Campbell (biochemist) (born 1945), British biochemist

== See also ==
- Antony F. Campbell (1934–2020), biblical scholar
- Tony Campbell (disambiguation)
