= Forms of the Old Testament Literature =

Forms of the Old Testament Literature is a series of biblical commentaries published by Eerdmans. The first volume was Wisdom Literature:Job, Proverbs, Ruth, Canticles, Ecclesiastes, and Esther by Roland E. Murphy (1981). They were initially edited by Rolf Knierim and Gene M. Tucker; Marvin A. Sweeney took over from Tucker in 1997. The series focuses on a form-critical approach to the text. Each volume examines the genre, structure, setting, and intention associated with biblical texts. Henry T. C. Sun calls it "the only serious and sustained discussion of Old Testament form criticism available in English."

== Titles ==
Year	Title	Vol.	Author	ISBN	OCLC
1981	Wisdom Literature:Job, Proverbs, Ruth, Canticles, Ecclesiastes, and Esther	XIII	Murphy, Roland E.	978-0-8028-1877-5	1056586342
1983	Genesis: with an Introduction to Narrative Literature	I	Coats, George W.	978-0-8028-1954-3	976893731
1984	1 Kings: with an Introduction to Historical Literature	IX	Long, Burke O.	978-0-8028-1920-8	612745122
1984	Daniel: with an Introduction to Apocalyptic Literature	XX	Collins, John J.	978-0-8028-0020-6	11043368
1988	Psalms, Part 1: with an Introduction to Cultic Poetry	XIV	Gerstenberger, Erhard S.	978-0-8028-0255-2	16901173
1989	1 and 2 Chronicles	XI	De Vries, Simon J.	978-0-8028-0236-1	17917323
1989	Ezekiel	XIX	Hals, Ronald M.	978-0-8028-0340-5	19127833
1991	2 Kings	X	Long, Burke O.	978-0-8028-0535-5	24502934
1996	Isaiah 1-39: with an Introduction to Prophetic Literature	XVI	Sweeney, Marvin A.	978-0-8028-4100-1	851047060
1998	Exodus 1-18	IIA	Coats, George W.	978-0-8028-0592-8	246136013
2000	Micah	XXIB	Ben Zvi, Ehud	978-0-8028-4599-3	838086787
2000	Psalms, Part 2, and Lamentations	XV	Gerstenberger, Erhard S.	978-0-8028-0488-4	313780761
2003	1 Samuel	VII	Campbell, Antony F.	978-0-8028-6079-8	971430885
2005	Numbers	IV	Knierim, Rolf P. & Coats, George W.	978-0-8028-2231-4	892706375
2005	2 Samuel	VIII	Campbell, Antony F.	978-0-8028-2813-2	845836340
2005	Hosea	XXIA/1	Ben Zvi, Ehud	978-0-8028-0795-3	494042584
2013	Judges	VIB	Frolov, Serge	978-0-8028-2967-2	955551299
2016	Isaiah 40-66	XVII	Sweeney, Marvin A.	978-0-8028-6607-3	1020473960
