= Tony Campbell (disambiguation) =

Tony Campbell (born 1962) is an American basketball player.

Tony Campbell may also refer to:

- Tony Campbell (biblical scholar) (1934–2020), New Zealand biblical scholar
- Tony Campbell (footballer) (born 1967), Australian rules football player

== See also ==
- Tonie Campbell, American Olympic hurdler
- Anthony Campbell (disambiguation)
