= Robert Jenson =

American Lutheran theologian (1930–2017)

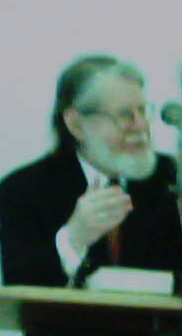
- Jenson in the classroom
- Born: Robert William Jenson; August 2, 1930; Eau Claire, Wisconsin, US
- Died: September 5, 2017 (aged 87); Princeton, New Jersey, US
- Spouse: Blanche Rockne (m. c. 1954)

Academic background
- Education: Luther College; Luther Seminary; Heidelberg University
- Thesis: Cur Deus Homo? (1959)
- Doctoral advisor: Peter Brunner
- Influences: Karl Barth; Rudolf Bultmann; Gregory of Nyssa; Martin Luther; Maximus the Confessor; Wolfhart Pannenberg; Gerhard von Rad

Academic work
- Discipline: Theology
- Sub-discipline: Systematic theology
- School or tradition: Lutheranism
- Institutions: Luther College; Mansfield College, Oxford; Lutheran Theological Seminary at Gettysburg; St. Olaf College
- Doctoral students: Colin Gunton
- Notable works: The Triune Identity (1982); Systematic Theology (1997–1999)
- Influenced: Roger E. Olson

Robert William Jenson (August 2, 1930 – September 5, 2017) was a leading American Lutheran and ecumenical theologian. Prior to his retirement in 2007, he spent seven years as the director of the Center of Theological Inquiry in Princeton, NJ. He was the co-founder of the Center for Catholic and Evangelical Theology and is known for his two-volume Systematic Theology, published between 1997 and 1999.

== Student years ==
Jenson was born on August 2, 1930, in Eau Claire, Wisconsin. He studied classics and philosophy at Luther College in the late 1940s, before beginning theological studies at Luther Seminary in 1951. Due to a car accident he missed most of his first-year seminary studies; he immersed himself in the works of Immanuel Kant and Søren Kierkegaard during that year. Jenson began reading historical-critical scholars like Hermann Gunkel and Sigmund Mowinckel, and as a result he became deeply interested in the biblical texts and in the theological significance of the Old Testament.

At Luther Seminary, Jenson was assistant to the renowned orthodox Lutheran theologian, Herman Preus. Preus infused Jenson with an admiration for the theology of post-Reformation Lutheran scholasticism, and with a strong belief in an orthodox Lutheran understanding of predestination. Against the majority of the staff at Luther Seminary at that time, who believed that God elected individuals to salvation on the basis of "foreseen faith", Preus held that God had decreed the salvation of a definite number of the elect, without a decree of reprobation. Other influences at Luther Seminary included Edmund Smits, who introduced Jenson to the work of Augustine of Hippo, and fellow student Gerhard Forde, who introduced him to the work of Rudolf Bultmann. While studying at seminary, Jenson also met and married Blanche Rockne, who became one of the major stimuli for his theological work (one of his later books includes a dedication to Blanche, "the mother of all my theology"). (Note: The dedication is in Latin: "Genetrici theologiae meae omniae / Blanche amatissimae".)

After seminary, Jenson taught in the department of religion and philosophy at Luther College from 1955 to 1957, before moving to Heidelberg for doctoral studies in 1957–1958. Though he had planned to write his dissertation on Bultmann, his supervisor, Peter Brunner, advised him to work on Karl Barth's doctrine of election. Thus Jenson worked on Barth's theology at Heidelberg, and he also studied nineteenth-century German theology and philosophy, partly with the help of the new Heidelberg lecturer, Wolfhart Pannenberg. He also attended a seminar there with Martin Heidegger (and, during a later visit to Heidelberg, with Hans-Georg Gadamer). Even more significantly, at Heidelberg he became friends with another young Lutheran scholar, Carl Braaten, who would later become his "chief theological companion" and his most important theological collaborator.

== Early career ==
Jenson's doctoral dissertation (revised and published in 1963 as Alpha and Omega) was completed in Basel, with Barth's approval, and so Jenson returned to Luther College, where he continued to study Barth while also developing an increasing interest in the philosophy of G. W. F. Hegel. The faculty of the religion department was uncomfortable with Jenson's theological liberalism, and his openness to biblical criticism and evolutionary biology was strongly condemned. When the college failed to force Jenson's retirement, several professors from the religion and biology departments resigned in protest. From 1960 to 1966, Jenson was thus left with the task of helping to rebuild an entire religion department, and he became especially involved in the development of a new philosophy department. During these years, he also wrote A Religion Against Itself (1967), which sharply critiqued the American religious culture of the 1960s.

Jenson finally left Luther College to spend three years as Dean and Tutor of Lutheran Studies at Mansfield College, Oxford University. Here he was able to focus for the first time on teaching theology, and he was deeply influenced by his encounters with Anglicanism and with ecumenical worship. The three years at Oxford marked a creative and productive period in Jenson's career. In The Knowledge of Things Hoped For (1969), he sought to integrate the traditions of European hermeneutics and English analytical philosophy, while also drawing on patristic and medieval theologians such as Origen and Thomas Aquinas. And in God after God (1969), he sought to go beyond the "death of God" theology by emphasizing the actualism and futurity of God's being. The proposal advanced in God after God was in many respects parallel to the new "theology of hope" that was being developed at the time in Germany by young scholars like Jürgen Moltmann and Wolfhart Pannenberg. At Oxford, Jenson also supervised the doctoral work of Colin Gunton, who went on to become one of Great Britain's most distinguished and influential systematic theologians.

From Oxford, Jenson returned to America in 1968 and took up a position at the Lutheran Seminary in Gettysburg. His work here focused in part on distinctively Lutheran themes, especially in the books Lutheranism (1976) and Visible Words (1978). He also began to engage deeply with patristic thought (especially with Gregory of Nyssa, Cyril of Alexandria, and Maximus the Confessor), which led him to develop a creative new proposal for trinitarian theology in The Triune Identity (1982).

Further, as a result of his encounter with Anglicanism at Oxford, Jenson was appointed to the first round of Lutheran–Episcopal ecumenical dialogue in 1968. This was the beginning of his long involvement with the ecumenical movement, which would deeply shape his later theology. With George Lindbeck, he became involved in the Roman Catholic–Lutheran dialogue; and in 1988, he spent time at the Institute for Ecumenical Research at Strasbourg. Throughout his career, Jenson's theology continued to move in an increasingly Catholic, conservative and ecumenical direction. He interacted extensively with the work of Catholic theologians like Joseph Ratzinger (Pope Benedict XVI) and Hans Urs von Balthasar and with Eastern Orthodox theologians like Maximus the Confessor, John Zizioulas, and Vladimir Lossky.

== Later career ==
After two decades of teaching at Lutheran Theological Seminary in Gettysburg, Jenson moved in 1988 to the religion department of St. Olaf College in Northfield, Minnesota. He was joined in Northfield by his friend Carl Braaten, and together they founded the conservative Center for Catholic and Evangelical Theology in 1991. The founding of this center marked a new period of intensive ecumenical involvement for Jenson: with Braaten, he organized numerous ecumenical conferences and began publishing the theological journal Pro Ecclesia, where he remained a senior editor until his death.

Jenson continued to teach at St. Olaf College until 1998, when he retired and took up a position as Senior Scholar for Research at the Center for Theological Inquiry in Princeton, New Jersey. Before leaving St. Olaf College, he completed work on his magnum opus, the two-volume Systematic Theology (1997–1999), which has since been widely regarded as one of the most important and creative recent works of systematic theology. In a review of this work, Wolfhart Pannenberg described Jenson as "one of the most original and knowledgeable theologians of our time".

Jenson died in his home in Princeton on September 5, 2017.

== Works ==
=== Authored works ===
- Cur Deus Homo? The Election of Jesus Christ in the Theology of Karl Barth (Heidelberg doctoral dissertation; 1959)
- Alpha and Omega: A Study in the Theology of Karl Barth (1963)
- A Religion Against Itself (1967)
- God after God: The God of the Past and the God of the Future, Seen in the Work of Karl Barth (1969)
- The Knowledge of Things Hoped For: The Sense of Theological Discourse (1969)
- (with Carl E. Braaten) The Futurist Option (1970)
- Story and Promise: A Brief Theology of the Gospel about Jesus (1973)
- (with Eric W. Gritsch) Lutheranism: The Theological Movement and Its Writings (1976)
- Visible Words: The Interpretation and Practice of Christian Sacraments (1978)
- The Triune Identity: God According to the Gospel (1982)
- Story and Promise: A Brief Theology of the Gospel about Jesus (1983)
- America's Theologian: A Recommendation of Jonathan Edwards (1988)
- A Large Catechism (1991)
- Unbaptized God: The Basic Flaw in Ecumenical Theology (1992)
- Essays in Theology of Culture (1995)
- Systematic Theology: Volume 1: The Triune God (1997)
- Systematic Theology: Volume 2: The Works of God (1999)
- On Thinking the Human: Resolutions of Difficult Notions (2003)
- Song of Songs (2005)
- (with Solveig Lucia Gold) Conversations with Poppi about God: An Eight-Year-Old and Her Theologian Grandfather Trade Questions (November 2006)
- Ezekiel (2009)
- Canon and Creed (2010)
- Lutheran Slogans: Use and Abuse (2011)
- Theology as Revisionary Metaphysics: Essays on God and Creation (edited by Stephen John Wright) (2014)
- A Theology in Outline: Can These Bones Live? (2016)

=== Edited works ===
- (edited with Carl E. Braaten) Christian Dogmatics, 2 vols. (1984)
- (edited with Carl E. Braaten) A Map of Twentieth Century Theology: Readings from Karl Barth to Radical Pluralism (1995)
- (edited with Carl E. Braaten) Either/Or: The Gospel or Neopaganism (1995)
- (edited with Carl E. Braaten) The Catholicity of the Reformation (1996)
- (edited with Carl E. Braaten) Reclaiming the Bible for the Church (1996)
- (edited with Carl E. Braaten) The Two Cities of God: The Church's Responsibility for the Earthly City (1997)
- (edited with Oswald Bayer and Simo Knuuttila) Caritas Dei: Beiträge zum Verständnis Luthers und der gegenwärtigen Ökumene: Festschrift für Tuomo Mannermaa zum 60. Geburtstag (1997)
- (edited with Carl E. Braaten) Union with Christ: The New Finnish Interpretation of Luther (1998)
- (edited with Carl E. Braaten) Marks of the Body of Christ (1999)
- (edited with Carl E. Braaten) Sin, Death, and the Devil (1999)
- (edited with Carl E. Braaten) Church Unity and the Papal Office: An Ecumenical Dialogue on John Paul II's Encyclical Ut Unum Sint (2001)
- (edited with Carl E. Braaten) The Strange New World of the Gospel: Re-Evangelizing in the Postmodern World (2002)
- (edited with Carl E. Braaten) Jews and Christians: People of God (2003)
- (edited with Carl E. Braaten) The Last Things: Biblical and Theological Perspectives on Eschatology (2003)
- (edited with Carl E. Braaten) In One Body through the Cross: The Princeton Proposal for Christian Unity (2003)
- (edited with Carl E. Braaten) The Ecumenical Future (2004)
- (edited with Carl E. Braaten) Mary, Mother of God (2004)
