= Blankenbaker =

Blankenbaker is a surname. Notable people with the surname include:

- George Blankenbaker (born 1933), American Old Testament theologian
- John Blankenbaker (born 1929), American, designer and inventor of the Kenbak-1, considered the first personal computer
- Virginia Murphy Blankenbaker (born 1933), American politician and educator

== See also ==
- Lynne Blankenbeker, American politician
