= FOTL =

FOTL may refer to:

- Forms of the Old Testament Literature, book series
- Fruit of the Loom, clothing company
- Future of the Left, Welsh band
- The Fat of the Land, 1997 studio album by The Prodigy
- Freeman on the land, movement based on pseudolegal conspiracy theories
- Friends of the Library, term for a non-profit organization with the purpose of supporting a library
