= Eric W. Gritsch =

American Lutheran ecumenical theologian and scholar (1931-2012)

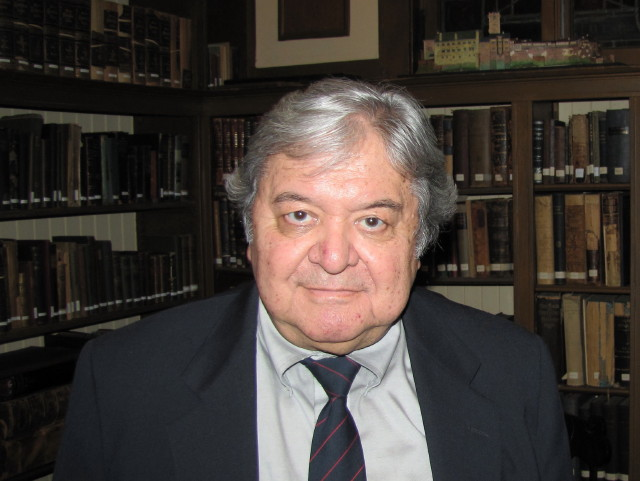
Eric W. Gritsch, 2009

Eric W. Gritsch (originally Erich Walter Gritsch, April 19, 1931, Neuhaus am Klausenbach, Austria - December 29, 2012, Baltimore, United States) was an American Lutheran ecumenical theologian and Luther scholar.

== Early life and student years ==
Gritsch was raised in a Lutheran pastor's family in Bernstein im Burgenland in Austria. His family was deeply affected by the Anschluss and the Second World War. His father died on a death march as a Russian prisoner of war, but Gritsch himself, who had been drafted into a Werwolf group, escaped capture by posing as a gypsy boy. He returned to Bernstein and graduated with Matura in 1950. The same year, he matriculated at the University of Vienna to study Protestant theology. In 1954 he received a Fulbright scholarship and came to Yale University for the academic year 1954/55. After going back to Austria to complete his ministerial training, he immigrated to the United States in 1957, initially for doctoral studies with Roland H. Bainton. His thesis was on Thomas Müntzer, the radical reformer.

== Career ==
Gritsch's first teaching position was at Wellesley College from 1959 to 1961. In 1961, he was called to Gettysburg Seminary, where he taught Church History and Reformation Studies until his retirement in 1994. In 1970, he became the first director of the seminary's Institute for Luther Studies and responsible for the series of scholarly conferences at Gettysburg known as Martin Luther Colloquy.

Since his early days in Gettysburg, he was active in the Christian-Jewish dialog. The Lutheran World Federation made him a board member of its Institute for Ecumenical Research in Strasbourg, and for the ELCA he was a member of the American Lutheran-Catholic Dialog Commission (1971–1992). He also served on the board of the Lajos-Ordass-Foundation. Together with Robert Jenson, he produced Lutheranism. The Theological Movement and Its Confessional Writings, a widely used resource book.

Gritsch was part of a team that translated and edited the American edition of Luther's works. Assisted by his wife Ruth (1931–2009), he translated and edited vols. 39 and 41. He also cooperated on the translation and edition of the Book of Concord (Kolb/Wengert edition).

== Later years ==
In retirement, Gritsch lived in Baltimore with his wife Bonnie. He remained active as lecturer and teacher. From 1995 to 2005, he taught at the Ecumenical Institute of St. Mary’s University in Baltimore. At the Melanchthon Institute in Houston, Texas he held an endowed chair named in his honor in 2000.

He was a member of Zion Lutheran Church and director of its Zion Forum for German Culture. His latest major works were a history of Lutheranism and his autobiography The Boy from the Burgenland. From Hitler Youth to Seminary Professor, which also contains a number of his articles.

== Works ==
- Reformer Without a Church. The Life and Thought of Thomas Müntzer (1488?-1525). Philadelphia: Fortress Press, 1967.
- (with Robert W. Jenson) Lutheranism. The Theological Movement and Its Confessional Writings. Philadelphia: Fortress Press, 1976.
- Born Againism. Perspectives on a Movement. Philadelphia: Fortress Press, 1982.
- Martin - God’s Court Jester. Luther in Retrospect. Philadelphia: Fortress Press, 1983.
- Thomas Müntzer. A Tragedy of Errors. Minneapolis: Fortress Press, 1989.
- Fortress Introduction to Lutheranism. Minneapolis: Fortress Press, 1994.

Hungarian Edition: Lutheranizmus. [Budapest]: Magyarországi Luther Szövetség, 2000

- A History of Lutheranism. Minneapolis: Fortress Press, 2002.
- A Handbook for Christian Life in the 21st Century. Dehli, NY: American Lutheran Publicity Bureau, 2005.
- The Wit of Martin Luther. Facet Book. Minneapolis: Fortress Press, 2006.
- The Boy from the Burgenland. From Hitler Youth to Seminary Professor. West Conshohocken, PA: Infinity Publishing Company, 2006.
- Toxic Spirituality. Enduring Temptations of Christian Faith. Minneapolis: Fortress Press, 2009.
- Martin Luther's Anti-Semitism: Against His Better Judgement. Grand Rapids: Wm. B. Eerdmans Publishing Company, 2012
- Good Friday's Good News: Meditations for the Mean Meantime. Eugene, OR: Cascade Books, 2014.
