= Polzin =

Polzin is a surname. Notable people with the surname include:

- Alexander Polzin (born 1973), German artist and costume and set designer
- Daniela Polzin (born 1979), Brazilian judoka
- Jacob Ephraim Polzin (1778–1851), German architect
- Robert Polzin, American biblical scholar
