= Lowell G. Almen =

American Lutheran bishop (born 1941)

Lowell G. Almen (born 1941) is a Lutheran bishop who served as the Secretary of the Evangelical Lutheran Church in America from 1988–2007. Elected to that position at the constituting convention of the ELCA in 1988 for a four-year term, Almen has been re-elected numerous times.

Almen graduated from Luther Seminary in 1967, and was ordained in the American Lutheran Church. Almen's offices are at the national headquarters of the ELCA, in Chicago, Illinois. From there, he serves as the church's secretary, chief archivist and historian, and manages the roster of ordained persons.

Almen is the author of One Great Cloud of Witnesses (Minneapolis:Augsburg, 1997) & More to the Story (Minneapolis: Lutheran University Press, 2010).

In 2006, Almen met with Pope Benedict XVI following his regular weekly audience on March 22.
