= Martin Noth =

German scholar (1902–1968)

- Born: 3 August 1902; Dresden
- Died: 30 May 1968 (aged 65); Negev, Israel
- Education: Erlangen, Rostock, Leipzig
- Occupations: Taught at Bonn, Göttingen, Tübingen, Hamburg, and University of Basel
- Notable work: The Deuteronomistic History
- Theological work
- Language: German
- Main interests: Pre-Exilic history of the Hebrews
- Notable ideas: Traditional-historical approach to biblical studies

Martin Noth (3 August 1902 – 30 May 1968) was a German scholar of the Hebrew Bible who specialized in the pre-Exilic history of the Hebrews and promoted the hypothesis that the Israelite tribes in the immediate period after the settlement in Canaan were organised as a group of twelve tribes arranged around a central sanctuary along the lines of the later Greek and Italian amphictyonies. With Gerhard von Rad he also pioneered the traditional-historical approach to biblical studies, emphasising the role of oral traditions in the formation of the biblical texts.

== Life ==
Noth was born in Dresden, Kingdom of Saxony. He studied at the universities of Erlangen, Rostock, and Leipzig and taught at Greifswald and Königsberg.

From 1939 to 1941 and 1943–45, Noth served as a German soldier during World War II. After the war he taught at Bonn, Göttingen, Tübingen, Hamburg, and University of Basel. He died during an expedition in the Negev, Israel.

== Influence ==
Noth first attracted widespread attention with "Das System der zwölf Stämme Israels" ("The Scheme of the Twelve Tribes of Israel", 1930), positing that the Twelve Tribes of Israel did not exist prior to the covenant assembly at Shechem described in the Book of Joshua.

"A History of Pentateuchal Traditions" (1948, English translation 1972) set out a new model for the composition of the Pentateuch, or Torah. Noth supplemented the dominant model of the time, the documentary hypothesis, seeing the Pentateuch as composed of blocks of traditional material accreted round some key historical experiences. He identified these experiences as "Guidance out of Egypt", "Guidance into the Arable Land", "Promise to the Patriarchs", "Guidance in the Wilderness" and "Revelation at Sinai", the details of the narrative serving to fill out the thematic outline. Later, Robert Polzin showed that some of his main conclusions were consistent with arbitrary or inconsistent use of the rules that he proposed.

Even more revolutionary and influential, and quite reorienting the emphasis of modern scholarship, was The Deuteronomistic History. In this work, Noth argued that the earlier theory of several Deuteronomist redactions of the books from Joshua to Kings did not explain the facts, and instead proposed that they formed a unified "Deuteronomic history", the product of a single author working in the late 7th century.

Noth also published commentaries on all five books of the Pentateuch: Genesis, Exodus, Leviticus, Numbers, and Deuteronomy. Noth considered that the book of Deuteronomy was more closely related to the following books of Joshua, Judges, Samuel, and Kings (The Deuteronomistic History). This theory is widely accepted today, and provides the framework for current research on the historical books of the Old Testament.

== Works ==
=== Books ===
- Noth, Martin (1957). Überlieferungsgeschichtliche Studien: Die sammelnden und bearbeitenden Geschichtswerke im Alten Testament. Tübingen: M. Niemeyer. OCLC 6106170.
- ——— (1958). History of Israel: Biblical History. London: Adam & Charles Black. OCLC 750923003. - translation of Geschichte Israels
- ——— (1959). Exodus: a commentary. Old Testament Library. London: SCM Press. OCLC 913482441. - translation of Das Zzweite Buch Mose : Exodus
- ——— (1962). Leviticus: a commentary. Old Testament Library. London: SCM Press. OCLC 923331089. - translation of Das Dritte Buch Mose: Leviticus
- ——— (1968). Numbers: a commentary. Old Testament Library. London: SCM Press. ISBN 9780334011569. OCLC 925325336. - translation of Das Vierte Buch Mose : Numeri
- ——— (1972). A History of Pentateuchal Traditions. Englewood Cliffs, NJ: Prentice-Hall. ISBN 9780133912357. OCLC 215462.
- ——— (1981). The Deuteronomistic History. Journal for the study of the Old Testament, Supplement series. Vol. 15. Sheffield, UK: University of Sheffield, Dept. of Biblical Studies. ISBN 9780905774251. OCLC 7642739. - translation of Überlieferungsgeschichtliche Studien

=== Articles ===
- ——— (1938). "Die Wege der Pharaonenheere in Palästina und Syrien. Untersuchungen zu den hieroglyphischen Listen palästinischer und syrischer Städte. III. Der Aufbau der Palästinaliste Thutmoses III". Zeitschrift des Deutschen Palästina-Vereins. 61: 26–65.
- ——— (1962). "The Background of Judges 17-18". In Anderson, Bernhard W.; Harrelson, Walter J. (eds.). Israel's Prophetic Heritage: essays in honor of James Muilenburg. New York: Harper. pp. 68–85. OCLC 5717754.
