= Carl Braaten =

American theologian (1929–2023)

The Reverend Carl Braaten
- Born: Carl Edward Braaten; January 3, 1929; Saint Paul, Minnesota, U.S.
- Died: October 28, 2023 (aged 94)
- Spouse: LaVonne Gardner (m. 1951)

Ecclesiastical career
- Religion: Christianity (Lutheran)
- Church: Evangelical Lutheran Church
- Ordained: 1958

Academic background
- Education: St. Olaf College; Luther Seminary; Harvard University
- Thesis: Christ, Faith and History (1959)
- Doctoral advisor: Paul Tillich
- Influences: Wolfhart Pannenberg

Academic work
- Discipline: Theology
- Institutions: Lutheran School of Theology at Chicago

Carl Edward Braaten (January 3, 1929 – October 28, 2023) was an American Lutheran theologian and minister.

Braaten authored and edited numerous books and theological papers, including Principles of Lutheran Theology (Fortress Press, 1983), Mother Church: Ecclesiology and Ecumenism (Fortress Press, 1998) and In One Body Through the Cross: The Princeton Proposal for Christian Unity (Eerdmans Publishing Company, 2003). Along with Robert Jenson, was an influential figure in developing and restoring the catholic roots of Lutheranism at the Lutheran School of Theology at Chicago.

== Biography ==
Carl Edward Braaten was born in Saint Paul, Minnesota on January 3, 1929. His parents were Norwegian-American pietists, who served as missionaries in Madagascar, and he received his early spiritual formation in that context. After finishing high school at Augustana Academy, a Lutheran boarding school in Canton, South Dakota, he attended St. Olaf College, Luther Seminary, Heidelberg University and Harvard Divinity School where he studied under Paul Tillich and earned his doctoral degree. His doctoral dissertation was titled Christ, Faith and History: An Inquiry into the Meaning of Martin Kähler's Distinction Between the Historical Jesus and the Biblical Christ Developed in the Past and Present Context. He was ordained by the Evangelical Lutheran Church in 1958.

At that time, he began serving a parish in Minneapolis and teaching at Luther Seminary. In 1961 Braaten, together with Robert Jenson, Roy Harrisville, Kent Knutson, James Burtness and others, founded the journal Dialog, which he continued to serve as editor until resigning in 1991. In 1962, Braaten accepted a position at the Lutheran School of Theology at Chicago where he taught as Professor of Systematic Theology until 1991. The same year, Braaten and Jenson founded the Center for Catholic and Evangelical Theology and established a new theological journal, Pro Ecclesia.

Braaten died on October 28, 2023, at the age of 94.

== Works ==
=== Author ===
- History and Hermeneutics Westminster Press (Philadelphia, PA), 1966.
- The Future of God: The Revolutionary Dynamics of Hope Harper & Row (New York, NY), 1969.
- Christ and Counter-Christ: Apocalyptic Themes in Theology and Culture Fortress Press (Philadelphia, PA), 1972.
- The Whole Counsel of God Fortress Press (Philadelphia, PA), 1974.
- Eschatology and Ethics: Essays on the Theology and Ethics of the Kingdom of God Augsburg Publishing House (Minneapolis, MN), 1974.
- (With wife, LaVonne Braaten) The Living Temple: A Practical Theology of the Body and the Foods of the Earth Harper & Row (New York, NY), 1976.
- The Flaming Center: A Theology of the Christian Mission Fortress Press (Philadelphia, PA), 1977.
- Principles of Lutheran Theology Fortress Press (Philadelphia, PA), 1983.
- Stewards of the Mysteries: Sermons for Festivals and Special Occasions Augsburg Publishing House (Minneapolis, MN), 1983.
- The Apostolic Imperative: Nature and Aim of the Church's Mission and Ministry Augsburg Publishing House (Minneapolis, MN), 1985.
- Justification: The Article by Which the Church Stands or Falls Fortress Press (Minneapolis, MN), 1990.
- No Other Gospel!: Christianity among the World's Religions Fortress Press (Minneapolis, MN), 1992.
- Mother Church: Ecclesiology and Ecumenism Fortress Press (Minneapolis, MN), 1998.
- That All May Believe: A Theology of the Gospel and the Mission of the Church. Grand Rapids: Eerdmans, 2008.
- Who Is Jesus? Disputed Questions and Answers. Grand Rapids: Eerdmans, 2011.

=== Editor ===
- (And translator, with Roy A. Harrisville) Kerygma and History: A Symposium on the Theology of Rudolf Bultmann, Abingdon Press (New York, NY), 1962.
- (And translator, with Roy A. Harrisville) The Historical Jesus and the Kerygmatic Christ: Essays on the New Quest of the Historical Jesus, Abingdon Press (New York, NY), 1964.
- (And translator) Martin Kähler, The So-Called Historical Jesus and the Historic Biblical Christ, Fortress Press (Philadelphia, PA), 1964, reprinted, 1988.
- Paul Tillich, Perspectives on Nineteenth and Twentieth-Century Protestant Theology, Harper & Row (New York, NY), 1967.
- Paul Tillich, A History of Christian Thought, Harper & Row (New York, NY), 1968, published as A History of Christian Thought, from Its Judaic and Hellenistic Origins to Existentialism, Simon & Schuster (New York, NY), 1972.
- (With Avery Dulles) Wolfhart Pannenberg, Spirit, Faith, and Church, Westminster Press (Philadelphia, PA), 1970.
- (With Robert W. Jenson) The Futurist Option, Newman Press (New York, NY), 1970.
- The New Church Debate: Issues Facing American Lutheranism, Fortress Press (Philadelphia, PA), 1983.
- (With Robert W. Jenson) Christian Dogmatics (two volumes), Fortress Press (Philadelphia, PA), 1984.
- (With Philip Clayton) The Theology of Wolfhart Pannenberg: Twelve American Critiques, with an Autobiographical Essay and Response, Augsburg Publishing House (Minneapolis, MN), 1988.
- Our Naming of God: Problems and Prospects of God-Talk Today, Fortress Press (Minneapolis, MN), 1989.
- (With Robert W. Jenson) Reclaiming the Bible for the Church, W. B. Eerdmans (Grand Rapids, MI), 1995.
- (With Robert W. Jenson) A Map of Twentieth-Century Theology: Readings from Karl Barth to Radical Pluralism, Fortress Press (Minneapolis, MN), 1995.
- (With Robert W. Jenson) Either/Or: The Gospel or Neopaganism, W. B. Eerdmans (Grand Rapids, MI), 1995.
- (With Robert W. Jenson) The Catholicity of the Reformation, W. B. Eerdmans (Grand Rapids, MI), 1996.
- (With Robert W. Jenson) The Two Cities of God: The Church's Responsibility for the Earthly City, W. B. Eerdmans (Grand Rapids, MI), 1997.
- (With Robert W. Jenson) Union with Christ: The New Finnish Interpretation of Luther, W. B. Eerdmans (Grand Rapids, MI), 1998.
- (With Robert W. Jenson) Marks of the Body of Christ, W. B. Eerdmans (Grand Rapids, MI), 1999.
- (With Robert W. Jenson) Sin, Death, and the Devil, W. B. Eerdmans (Grand Rapids, MI), 2000.
- (With Robert W. Jenson) Church Unity and the Papal Office: An Ecumenical Dialogue on John Paul II's Encyclical "Ut unum sint" ("That All May Be One"), W. B. Eerdmans (Grand Rapids, MI), 2001.
- (With Robert W. Jenson) The Last Things: Biblical and Theological Perspectives on Eschatology, W. B. Eerdmans (Grand Rapids, MI), 2002.
- (With Robert W. Jenson) The Strange New World of the Gospel: Re-evangelizing in the Postmodern World, W. B. Eerdmans (Grand Rapids, MI), 2002.
- (With Robert W. Jenson) Jews and Christians: People of God, W. B. Eerdmans (Grand Rapids, MI), 2003.
- (With Robert W. Jenson) Ecumenical Future: Background Papers for "In One Body through the Cross: The Princeton Proposal for Christian Unity," W. B. Eerdmans (Grand Rapids, MI), 2003.

== Sources ==
- Contemporary Authors Online, Gale, 2004.
