= Serge Frolov =

Russian biblical scholar (b. 1959)

Serge Frolov (born 1959) is a Russian biblical scholar. He is Professor of Religious Studies and the Nate and Ann Levine Endowed Chair in Jewish Studies at Southern Methodist University, where he has taught since 2002.

Frolov was born in Saint Petersburg (then Leningrad) and obtained a PhD in history at Leningrad State University. He emigrated to Israel in 1990 and began studying at the Shalom Hartman Institute and teaching at the Open University of Israel. In 2002 he obtained a second PhD from Claremont Graduate University under the supervision of Marvin Sweeney. His dissertation was later published as The Turn Of The Cycle: 1 Samuel 1-8 In Synchronic And Diachronic Perspectives (Walter de Gruyter, 2004). Frolov has also written Judges in Eerdmans' The Forms of the Old Testament Literature series (2013).

Frolov states that he started with source and redaction criticism but became more interested in form and literary criticism. He rejects the Documentary Hypothesis.
