= Ehud Ben Zvi =

Historian of ancient Israel (born 1951)

- Citizenship: Canadian
- Occupation: Historian

Academic background
- Education: Professor of History
- Alma mater: Hebrew University; Open University of Israel; Tel Aviv University; Emory University

Ehud Ben Zvi is an Argentina-born Canadian historian of ancient Israel focusing on the Achaemenid period and a scholar of the Hebrew Bible with a focus on Social Memory. He is Professor Emeritus in the Department of History, Classics and Religion at the University of Alberta, where he worked for the span of his entire academic career.

== Education ==
Ehud Ben Zvi was born in Argentina. He moved to Israel and graduated from the Hebrew University in Jerusalem with a BSc, the Open University of Israel with a BA, and Tel Aviv University, MA before obtaining his PhD from Emory University under Gene Tucker.

== Academic scholarship ==
Ben Zvi's is the author of Social Memory among the Literati of Yehud (BZAW, 509; Berlin: de Gruyter 2019), History, Literature and Theology in the Book of Chronicles (London: Equinox, 2006), Hosea, (FOTL 21A, part 1; Grand Rapids, MI: Eerdmans, 2005), Signs of Jonah: Reading and Rereading in Ancient Yehud (JSOTSupS 367; Sheffield: Sheffield Academic Press/Continuum, 2003),Micah, (FOTL 21b; Grand Rapids, MI: Eerdmans, 2000), A Historical-Critical Study of The Book of Obadiah, (BZAW 242; Berlin/New York: deGruyter, 1996), and "A Historical-Critical Study of The Book of Zephaniah", (BZAW 198; Berlin/New York: deGruyter, 1991. He co-authored with Jim D. Nogalski "Two Sides of a Coin: Juxtaposing Views on Interpreting the Book of the Twelve/the Twelve Prophetic Books" (Analecta Gorgiana, 201; Piscataway, NJ: Gorgias Press, 2009), and with two of his former students (Maxine Hancock and Richard Beinert) "Readings in Biblical Hebrew. An Intermediate Textbook", (New Haven: Yale University Press, 1993).

He has also edited and co-edited a substantial number of collected essays volumes (e.g., Remembering Biblical Figures in the Late Persian & Early Hellenistic Periods: Social Memory and Imagination [co-edited with Diana Edelman; Oxford: Oxford University Press, 2013]; Centres and Peripheries in the Early Second Temple Period [co-edited with Christoph Levin; FAT, 108; Tübingen: Mohr-Siebeck, 2016]; "About Edom and Idumea in the Persian Period: Recent Research and Approaches from Archaeology, Hebrew Bible Studies and Ancient Near East Studies" [co-edited with Benedikt Hensel and Diana V. Edelman; WANEM; London: Equinox, 2022]), and some special issues of journals (e.g., HebAI 9/4 (2020); Thematical Issue: Tōrâ-centred Israel. When a Yehudite Concept Met Ptolemaic Egypt [co-edited with Sylvie Honigman]). He has published numerous essays on social memory studies as they pertain to Ancient Israel, the historical and prophetic books of the Hebrew Bible. A list of his works can be accessed at https://sites.ualberta.ca/~ebenzvi/ebz-publications.html and at Ben Zvi's ORCID page.

Ben Zvi founded the Journal of Hebrew Scriptures in 1996 and served as its general editor until 2013. He was one of the founders and served as first chair of the SBL International Cooperation Initiative, 2006-2013, and was one of the two founding co-editors of Ancient Near East Monographs (SBL Press).

He has served as president of the Society of Biblical Literature (2025), European Association of Biblical Studies (2016-2018), the Canadian Society of Biblical Studies, 2001-2002, and the Pacific-Northwest American Academy of Religion/Society of Biblical Literature (1995-96).

In 2015, a Festschrift was published in his honour. History, Memory, Hebrew Scriptures: A Festschrift for Ehud Ben Zvi.
