= Journal of Hebrew Scriptures =

- Discipline: Biblical studies
- Language: English
- Edited by: Christophe Nihan; Anna Angelini; Ian D. Wilson

Publication details
- History: 1996–present
- Publisher: University of Alberta

Standard abbreviations
- ISO 4: J. Hebr. Scr.

Indexing
- ISSN: 1203-1542

Links
- Journal homepage; Online archive

The Journal of Hebrew Scriptures is a peer-reviewed, open-access journal published by the University of Alberta. It was established in 1996 with Ehud Ben Zvi as the founding editor, and covers the Hebrew Bible and the history of ancient Israel and Judah. The editors are Christophe Nihan (University of Münster), Anna Angelini (University of Siena), and Ian D. Wilson (University of Alberta).
