= Wolfhart Pannenberg =

German Lutheran theologian (1928–2014)

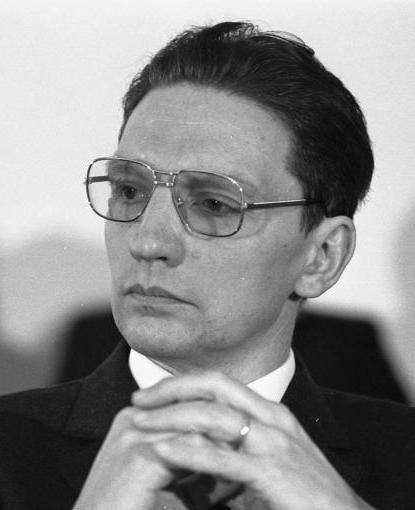
- Pannenberg in 1983
- Born: 2 October 1928; Stettin, Germany
- Died: 4 September 2014 (aged 85); Munich, Germany

Academic background
- Education: University of Berlin; University of Göttingen; Heidelberg University (PhD); University of Basel
- Influences: Karl Barth; Hans von Campenhausen; G. W. F. Hegel; Karl Löwith; Gerhard von Rad; Edmund Schlink

Academic work
- Discipline: Theology
- Sub-discipline: Systematic theology
- School or tradition: Lutheranism
- Institutions: Kirchliche Hochschule Wuppertal; University of Mainz; LMU Munich
- Doctoral students: Philip Clayton; William Lane Craig; Stanley Grenz
- Notable students: Gunther Wenz
- Influenced: Carl Braaten; Robert Jenson; Roger Olson; Ted Peters; Jon Sobrino

Wolfhart Pannenberg (2 October 1928 – 4 September 2014) was a German Lutheran theologian. He made a number of significant contributions to modern theology, including his concept of history as a form of revelation centered on the resurrection of Christ, which has been widely debated in both Protestant and Catholic theology, as well as by non-Christian thinkers.

== Life and career ==
Pannenberg was born on 2 October 1928 in Stettin, Germany, now Szczecin, Poland. He was baptized as an infant into the Evangelical (Lutheran) Church, but otherwise had virtually no contact with the church in his early years. At about the age of sixteen, however, he had an intensely religious experience he later called his "light experience". Seeking to understand this experience, he began to search through the works of great philosophers and religious thinkers. A high school literature teacher who had been a part of the Confessing Church during the Second World War encouraged him to take a hard look at Christianity, which resulted in Pannenberg's "intellectual conversion", in which he concluded that Christianity was the best available religious option. This propelled him into his vocation as a theologian.

Pannenberg studied at the Humboldt University of Berlin, the University of Göttingen, Heidelberg University, and the University of Basel. At the University of Basel, Pannenberg studied under Karl Barth. His doctoral thesis at Heidelberg University was on Edmund Schlink's views on predestination in the works of Duns Scotus, which he submitted in 1953 and published a year later. His Habilitationsschrift in 1955 dealt with the relationship between analogy and revelation, especially the concept of analogy in the teaching of God's knowledge.

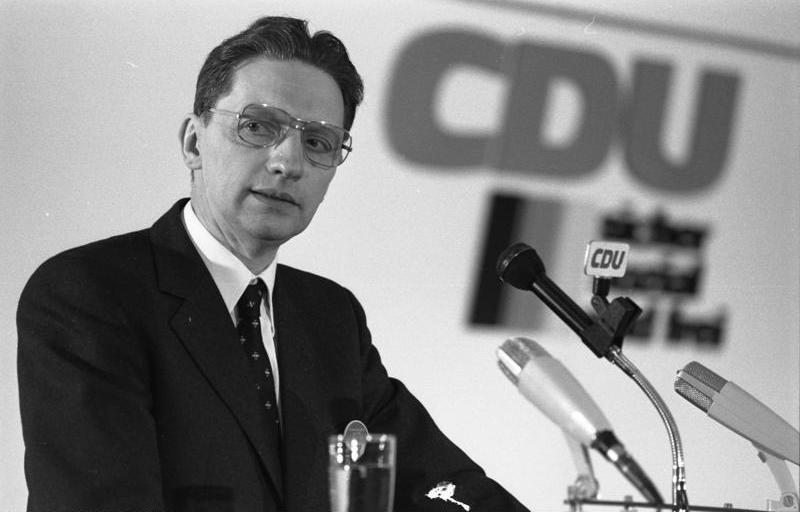
Pannenberg speaking at a Christian Democratic Union conference in Bonn in 1983

After 1958, Pannenberg consistently served as a professor on the faculties of several universities. Between the years of 1958 and 1961 he was the Professor of Systematic Theology at the Kirchliche Hochschule Wuppertal. Between 1961 and 1968, he was a professor at the University of Mainz. He had several visiting professorships at the University of Chicago (1963), Harvard University (1966), and at the Claremont School of Theology (1967), and since 1968 had been Professor of Systematic Theology at LMU Munich. He retired in 1993, and died at age 85 in 2014. Throughout his career, Pannenberg remained a prolific writer. As of December 2008, his "publication page" on LMU Munich's website lists 645 academic publications to his name.

== Theological views ==
Pannenberg's epistemology, explained clearly in his shorter essays, is crucial to his theological project. It is heavily influenced by Schlink, who proposed a distinction between analogical truth, i.e. a descriptive truth or model, and doxological truth, or truth as immanent in worship. In this way of thinking, theology tries to express doxological truth. As such, it is a response to God's self-revelation. Schlink was also instrumental in shaping Pannenberg's approach to theology as an ecumenical enterprise – an emphasis which remained constant throughout his career.

Pannenberg's understanding of revelation is strongly conditioned by his reading of Karl Barth and Georg Wilhelm Friedrich Hegel, as well as by a sympathetic reading of Christian and Jewish apocalyptic literature. The Hegelian concept of history as an unfolding process in which Spirit and freedom are revealed combines with a Barthian notion of revelation occurring "vertically from above". While Pannenberg adopts a Hegelian understanding of History itself as God's self-revelation, he strongly asserts the resurrection of Christ as a proleptic revelation of what history is unfolding. Despite its obvious Barthian reference, this approach met with a mainly hostile response from both neo-orthodox and liberal Bultmannian theologians in the 1960s, a response which Pannenberg claims surprised him and his associates. A more nuanced, mainly implied, critique came from Jürgen Moltmann, whose philosophical roots lay in the Left Hegelians, Karl Marx and Ernst Bloch, and who proposed and elaborated a Theology of Hope, rather than of prolepsis, as a distinctively Christian response to History.

As a disciple of Karl Löwith, Pannenberg continued the debate against Hans Blumenberg in the so-called 'theorem of secularization'. "Blumenberg targets Löwith's argument that progress is the secularization of Hebrew and Christian beliefs and argues to the contrary that the modern age, including its belief in progress, grew out of a new secular self-affirmation of culture against the Christian tradition."

Pannenberg is perhaps best known for Jesus: God and Man in which he constructs a Christology "from below", deriving his dogmatic claims from a critical examination of the life and particularly the resurrection of Jesus of Nazareth. This is his programmatic statement of the notion of "History as Revelation". He rejects traditional Chalcedonian "two-natures" Christology, preferring to view the person of Christ dynamically in light of the resurrection. This focus on the resurrection as the key to Christ's identity has led Pannenberg to defend its historicity, stressing the experience of the risen Christ in the history of the early Church rather than the empty tomb.

Eschatological views of Pannenberg discount the importance of temporal process in the New Creation, time being linked with the sinful present age. He preferred an eternal present to limited concepts of past, present and future and an end of time in a focused unity in the New Creation. Pannenberg has also defended the theology of American mathematical physicist Frank J. Tipler's Omega Point Theory.

Central to Pannenberg's theological career was his defence of theology as a rigorous academic discipline, one capable of critical interaction with philosophy, history, and most of all, the natural sciences. Michael Root wrote on First Things in 2012, "In recent years, he has been outspoken in his opposition within the Evangelical Church in Germany to any approval of homosexual relations. He said that a church that approved homosexual relations had by that act ceased to be a true church. In 1997, he created a public stir when he returned his Federal Order of Merit after the order was bestowed on a lesbian activist."

== Public Lectures ==
In 1994, Pannenberg delivered the eighth Erasmus Lecture, titled Christianity and the West, sponsored by First Things magazine and the Institute on Religion and Public Life. In his lecture, Pannenberg reflected on the historical and theological foundations of Western civilization, arguing that the decline of Christian belief in the modern world has profound implications for culture, moral order, and political life. His address exemplified the Erasmus series’ engagement with questions at the intersection of faith and contemporary society.

== Partial bibliography ==
=== Books by Pannenberg in English ===
- 1968. Revelation As History (edited volume). New York: The Macmillan Company.
- 1968. Jesus: God and Man. Philadelphia: Westminster Press.
- 1969. Basic Questions in Theology. Westminster Press
- 1969. Theology and the Kingdom of God. Westminster Press.
- 1970. What Is Man? Philadelphia: Fortress Press.
- 1972. The Apostles' Creed in Light of Today's Questions. Westminster Press.
- 1976. Theology and the Philosophy of Science. Westminster Press.
- 1977. Faith and Reality. Westminster Press.
- 1985. Anthropology in Theological Perspective. T&T Clark
- 1988–1994. Systematic Theology. T & T Clark

=== Online writings ===
- "God of the Philosophers," First Things, June/July 2007.
- "Letter from Germany," First Things, March 2003.
- "Facing Up: Science and Its Cultural Adversaries," First Things, August/September 2002.
- "Review of Robert W. Jenson's Systematic Theology: Volumes I & II," First Things, May 2000.
- "When Everything is Permitted," First Things, February 1998.
- "The Pope in Germany," First Things, December 1996.
- "How to Think About Secularism," First Things, June/July 1996.
- "Christianity and the West: Ambiguous Past, Uncertain Future," First Things, December 1994.
- "The Present and Future Church," First Things, November 1991.
- "God's Presence in History," Christian Century (11 March 1981): 260–63.
