= Klaus Koch =

German theologian (1926–2019)

- Born: October 4, 1926; Sulzbach, Germany
- Died: March 28, 2019 (aged 92); Apolda, Germany
- Education: Johannes Gutenberg University of Mainz and Eberhard Karls University of Tübingen
- Church: Lutheran
- Writings: The Growth of the Biblical Tradition: The Form Critical Method
- Offices held: Professor Emeritus of Old Testament, University of Hamburg
- Title: Reverend Doctor

Klaus Koch (October 4, 1926 – March 28, 2019) was an Old Testament scholar.

Koch first studied in the Johannes Gutenberg University of Mainz and later at the Eberhard Karls University of Tübingen. He did his doctoral dissertation at the Ruprecht Karl University of Heidelberg under Gerhard von Rad.

Later, Koch became a Pastor in the Lutheran Church in Prießnitz. He began his teaching career as a professor at the University of Kiel. He is Professor Emeritus of Old Testament and History of the Ancient near East Religions at the University of Hamburg, Germany.

Koch has identified Martin Noth and Gerhard von Rad as the Fathers of Redaction Criticism in Old Testament Studies.

Koch is best known for his assertion that the Old Testament wisdom literature has no concept of divine retribution. In his 1983 article, "Is there a Doctrine of Retribution in the Old Testament?", Koch argued for a "deed-consequences" construct, in which human deeds have "automatic and inescapable consequences", meaning that Yahweh does not need to intervene to punish or reward. He died on March 28, 2019.

== Selected bibliography ==
- Die Priesterschrift von Exodus 25 bis Leviticus 16 (1959)
- Was ist Formgeschichte?: Methoden der Bibelexegese: Mit einem Nachwort, Linguistik und Formgeschichte (1964; 5th ed. 1989) ISBN 3-7887-0394-6
- Book of Books: The Growth of the Bible (1969) ISBN 0-664-24840-3
- The Growth of the Biblical Tradition: The Form-critical Method (1969) ISBN 0-7136-0135-3
- The Rediscovery of Apocalyptic: A Polemical Work on a Neglected Area of Biblical Studies and Its Damaging Effects on Theology and Philosophy (1972) ISBN 0-334-01361-5
- Um das Prinzip der Vergeltung in Religion und Recht des Alten Testaments (Wege der Forschung) (1972) ISBN 3-534-03828-2
- Amos: Untersucht mit den Methoden einer strukturalen Formgeschichte (Alter Orient und Altes Testament) (1976) ISBN 3-7666-8954-1
- Das Buch Daniel (Erträge der Forschung) (1980) ISBN 3-534-07506-4
- The Prophets I - The Assyrian Period (1983) ISBN 0-8006-1648-0
- The Prophets II - The Babylonian and Persian Periods (1984) ISBN 0-8006-1756-8
- Daniel (Biblischer Kommentar. Altes Testament) (1986) ISBN 3-7887-0788-7
- Deuterokanonische Zusätze zum Danielbuch: Entstehung und Textgeschichte (Alter Orient und Altes Testament) (1987) ISBN 3-7666-9525-8
- Geschichte der ägyptischen Religion: Von den Pyramiden bis zu den Mysterien der Isis (1993) ISBN 3-17-009808-X
- Die Reiche der Welt und der kommende Menschensohn: Studien zum Danielbuch (Gesammelte Aufsätze) (1995) ISBN 3-7887-1515-4
- Vor der Wende der Zeiten: Beiträge zur apokalyptischen Literatur (Gesammelte Aufsätze) (1996) ISBN 3-7887-1606-1
- Reise durch Indonesien (1997) ISBN 3-8003-0803-7
- Die Schriftrollen von Qumran. Zur aufregenden Geschichte ihrer Erforschung und Deutung (1998)ISBN 3-7917-1592-5
- From Amos to Jesus - Biblical Eschatology and its Social and Political Implications, (1999) ISBN 81-7214-499-7
- Reclams Bibellexikon. Sonderausgabe (2000) ISBN 3-15-010470-X (with Eckart Otto and Jürgen Roloff)
- Biblischer Text und theologische Theoriebildung (2001) ISBN 3-7887-1835-8
- Europa, Tausendjähriges Reich und Neue Welt (2003) ISBN 3-17-017875-X (with Mariano Delgado and Edgar Marsch)
- Der Gott Israels und die Gotter des Orients Religionsgeschichtliche Studien II, (2006) ISBN 3-525-53079-X
