= Lajos Ordass =

Lajos Ordass (1901–1978), born Lajos Wolf, was a Bishop of the Evangelical-Lutheran Church in Hungary. In 1944 he changed his name to Ordass, Hungarian for wolf, to protest the German occupation of Hungary. Like Cardinal József Mindszenty, Bishop Ordass resisted communism in Hungary at great personal cost. He was convicted in a show trial and sentenced to two years in prison in 1948. After the 1956 Hungarian Revolution, he was able to resume exercise of his bishop's office, but was removed a second time in 1958, living in forced retirement after that until his death in 1978. Ordass was elected twice to be vice president of the Lutheran World Federation, in 1947 and 1957. He was rehabilitated posthumously by the Hungarian state after the collapse of communism in Eastern Europe.

== Biography ==
Ordass was born to a German speaking family in the village of Savino Selo (Torschau - German / Torzsa - Hungarian). Savino Selo / Torschau / Torzsa was settled in the late 18th century during the reign of Emperor Joseph II by German immigrants from Swabia. At that time Torschau was part of Austria-Hungary; today the village is located in Vojvodina, Serbia. Ordass' mother (Paula Steinmetz) was a native of Savino Selo / Torschau / Torzsa. Ordass' father (Arthur Wolf) moved to the village from Spišský / Szepesség, a region in modern Slovakia, then part of the Austro-Hungarian Monarchy. Arthur Wolf was the cantor and music instructor for the Lutheran congregation in Savino Selo / Torschau / Torzsa. Lajos was the fifth of six children born to his parents.
