= Anthony Campbell (biochemist) =

British biochemist (born 1945)

Anthony Keith Campbell FLS, FLSW, CBE (born 30 April 1945) is a British biochemist and honorary Professor based in the School of Pharmacy and Pharmaceutical Sciences at Cardiff University in Wales. He is a specialist in intracellular signalling, particularly calcium and bioluminescence. He invented the application of a chemiluminescent label in immunoassay and DNA testing, developed with colleagues, and now used in several hundred million clinical tests per year worldwide. He also proposed that the illness that afflicted Charles Darwin for fifty years may have been due to lactose and food intolerance.

== Early life and career ==
Anthony 'Tony' Campbell was born in Bangor, North Wales, but grew up in London, attending the City of London School. He obtained an exhibition at Pembroke College, Cambridge, and then a first-class degree in Natural Sciences, and a Ph.D. in Biochemistry, at Cambridge University. In 1970, he spent three months as a post-doctoral worker with Bo Hellman at the University of Umeå, Sweden. He moved to Cardiff as a lecturer in Medical Biochemistry at the then Welsh National School of Medicine in 1970. He became Professor in Medical Biochemistry there in 1991, and later, a Professor in the School of Pharmacy and Pharmaceutical Sciences at Cardiff University.

== Research ==
His research has focused on cell signalling. He has studied intracellular calcium as a cell regulator for over 50 years, pioneering the application of Ca2+-activated bioluminescent proteins to measure free Ca2+ in live animal, plant, bacterial, and archaeal cells; he has published books on intracellular calcium as a universal regulator.

He is an expert on bioluminescence, having developed the use of genetically engineered bioluminescent proteins to measure chemical processes in live cells. His study of bioluminescence began during his Ph.D. in Cambridge when he developed firefly luciferase to measure ATP in liver organ cultures. At the Marine Biological Association laboratory in Plymouth during the 1970s, he studied the bioluminescent hydroid Obelia geniculata. As a result of research on deep-sea bioluminescent organisms on the research ship RRS Discovery, he discovered that coelenterazine is the substance responsible for bioluminescent in at least eight phyla – Cnidaria, Ctenophora, Protozoa, Chaetognatha, Mollusca, Arthropoda, Echinodermata, Chordata, and that bioluminescence is the major communication system used at great ocean depths.

Since 2000, his research focus has been lactose and food intolerance, which has led to a new hypothesis on the cause of irritable bowel syndrome, and the mystery illness which afflicted Charles Darwin for 50 years but was never cured. He has written or edited 12 books, and over 250 peer-reviewed papers on intracellular calcium, bioluminescence, lactose and food intolerance. In 2020, he published his first novel Mirror Image; what Darwin missed, a scientific mystery based in Anglesey.

== Awards ==
He was elected a Fellow of the Linnean Society in 1994 and was a member of its Council from 2010 to 2015. He was elected a foreign member of The Royal Society of Sciences in Uppsala, Sweden in 1996, and gave a keynote lecture at its 300th anniversary. He won the Inspire Wales award for Science and Technology in 2011. In 2012, he was elected a Fellow of the Learned Society of Wales and awarded Commander of the Order of the British Empire (CBE) in the Queen's New Year Honours list in 2021. His chemiluminescence technology was awarded The Queen's Anniversary Prize for Chemiluminescence: research and development in clinical diagnosis in 1998 and was selected by the Eureka project of Universities UK in 2006 as one of the top one hundred inventions and discoveries from UK Universities in the past 50 years. When the UK celebrated 400 years of patents his key patent was selected as one of sixty for this celebration.

== Public engagement ==
Campbell founded the Darwin Centre in 1993, now in Pembrokeshire, for educating students and the public, interacting with over 40,000 students, and affecting pupil achievement and University subject choices. He also founded the Public Understanding of Science (PUSH) group at Cardiff University in 1994. Now called Science in Health, this organises events with schools and the public.

In 1996, he and his wife used his patent income to set up Welston Court Science Centre in Pembrokeshire, which is a facility to support the Darwin Centre. In 2016, with his wife, he set up The Young Darwinian, an international journal for school students to publish their projects and scientific experiences. He has appeared on several BBC children's programmes and documentaries, including Blue Peter, The Really Wild Show, Nature's Neons on Wildlife on One with David Attenborough, Tomorrow's World with Phillipa Forrester, QED, videos with The BBC Natural History Unit, Bristol, and given interviews on News at Ten, Wales Today, and the Discovery Channel Invention and Innovation series.

== Other interests ==
Campbell has been a musician all his life, as a tenor soloist, conductor, and viola player, trained under Gerald Davies at the Royal Welsh College of Music and Drama. His solo performances include The Lighthouse by Peter Maxwell Davies, and Amahl and the Night Visitors, directed by an opera producer from Covent Garden. He played the lead in several light operas at the New Theatre and Sherman Theatre, and other theatres in South Wales and sang as a soloist in oratorios at concerts in Paris and Cardiff including the Aldeburgh Festival. During the 1970s he was also deputy conductor of Cardiff Polyphonic Choir. For several years he was conductor of the University Hospital of Wales Choir and Chapel Choir, which he helped to found. As a tenor soloist he sang in several BBC Radio oratorio broadcasts.

As a student, he played bridge for Cambridge University and Cambridgeshire County, his team winning in 1970 the Inter-Universities Waddington cup. After 45 years, he started playing again and became Chairman of the Penarth Bridge Club, plays for East Wales, and writes weekly bridge articles for his local newspaper Penarth Times.

== Books by the author ==
- Campbell, AK. (1983). Intracellular Calcium: its universal role as regulator. pp 556. ISBN 0 471 10488 4. John Wiley and Sons: Chichester.
- Campbell, AK. (1988). Chemiluminescence: principles and applications in biology and medicine, pp608. ISBN 3-527-26342-X. 0 7156 2499 7. Horwood/VCH, Chichester and Weinheim.
- Campbell, AK. (1994). Rubicon: the fifth dimension of biology. pp 304. ISBN 0 7156 2499 7. Duckworth, London.
- Campbell, AK and Matthews, SB (2005). Tony's lactose free recipe book – the science of lactose intolerance and how to live without lactose. ISBN 0-9540866-1-9. The Welston Press, Pembrokeshire.
- Campbell, AK (2015). Intracellular calcium. Pp 789. ISBN 978-0470-695-111. Wiley, Chichester.
- Campbell AK (2017). Fundamentals of intracellular calcium, pp 428. ISBN 9781118941874. Wiley, Chichester.
- Campbell AK (2020. Mirror Image: what Darwin missed. ISBN 0-9540866-3-5. The Welston Press, Pembrokeshire.
