= Gerhard Forde =

American Lutheran theologian (1927–2005)

The Reverend Gerhard O. Forde
- Born: Gerhard Olaf Forde; September 10, 1927; Pope County, Minnesota US
- Died: August 9, 2005 (aged 77)

Ecclesiastical career
- Religion: Christianity (Lutheran)
- Church: American Lutheran Church; Evangelical Lutheran Church in America
- Ordained: 1955

Academic background
- Education: Luther College; Luther Seminary; Harvard Divinity School

Academic work
- Notable works: On Being a Theologian of the Cross: Reflections on Luther's Heidelberg Disputation, 1518 (1997)

Gerhard O. Forde (September 10, 1927 – August 9, 2005) was an American Lutheran theologian who wrote extensively on the Protestant Reformation and Lutheran theology and tradition.

== Background ==
Gerhard Olaf Forde was born in Pope County, Minnesota, and raised near Starbuck. He was the son of Gerhard Olavus (1884–1964) and Hannah (Halvorson) Forde (1888–1928). He received the B.A. degree from Luther College in 1950, attended the University of Wisconsin–Madison for one year, and then earned the Bachelor of Theology degree from Luther Seminary in 1955. He earned the Th.D. degree from Harvard Divinity School in 1967. Forde also studied at the University of Tübingen and was the Lutheran tutor at Mansfield College, Oxford University, 1968–1970. He also spent sabbatical years at Harvard (1972–73), Strasbourg (1979–80), and St. John's University Institute for Ecumenical and Cultural Research, Collegeville, Minnesota (1988).

== Career ==
Forde was a pastor in the American Lutheran Church and later in the Evangelical Lutheran Church in America after its founding. Forde's teaching career began at St. Olaf College, Northfield, Minnesota, where he was instructor in religion in 1955–56. Gerhard Forde joined the Luther Seminary faculty as lecturer in church history in 1959–1961. After moving to Luther College in Decorah, Iowa, as an assistant professor of religion in 1961–1963, he returned to the seminary as instructor in 1964 and was promoted to professor ten years later. Even after his retirement in 1998, he remained active as a teacher and lecturer for several years.

A member of the American Academy of Religion, Forde was also active as a member of the board of dialog, A Journal of Theology; the Lutheran–Roman Catholic dialogue; the commission for the new Lutheran Church; and the editorial board of The Lutheran Quarterly.

== Radical Lutheranism ==
In 1987, the Lutheran Quarterly was relaunched in the midst of the negotiations that led to the formation of the Evangelical Lutheran Church in America. In the lead issue of the "new series" of the journal, Forde provided a future view for American Lutheranism titled "Radical Lutheranism". In the article, Forde addressed the future of Lutheran identity that he viewed as being bound largely to ethnic and cultural backgrounds, not the theological identity forwarded by Forde that he stated as being a dedication to the "radical" gospel of Jesus Christ and the concept of justification by faith.

We should realize first of all that what is at stake on the current scene is certainly not Lutheranism as such. Lutheranism has no particular claim or right to existence. Rather, what is at stake is the radical gospel, radical grace, the eschatological nature of the gospel of Jesus Christ crucified and risen as put in its most uncompromising and unconditional form by St. Paul. What is at stake is a mode of doing theology and a practice in church and society derived from that radical statement of the gospel. ... I do want to pursue the proposition that Lutheranism especially in America might find its identity not by compromising with American religion but by becoming more radical about the gospel it has received. That is to say, Lutherans should become radicals, preachers of a gospel so radical that it puts the old to death and calls forth the new, and practitioners of the life that entails "for the time being."

Forde would continue to expound on the concept of Radical Lutheranism, most pointedly in his later book On Being a Theologian of the Cross: Reflections on Luther's Heidelberg Disputation, 1518 and essays published in A More Radical Gospel.

== Monographs ==
- The Preached God: Proclamation in Word and Sacrament (2007) Lutheran Quarterly Books
- The Captivation of the Will: Luther vs. Erasmus on Freedom and Bondage (2004) Lutheran Quarterly Books
- A More Radical Gospel: Essays on Eschatology, Authority, Atonement, and Ecumenism (2004)Eerdmans; edited by Mark C. Mattes, and Steven D. Paulson.
- On Being a Theologian of the Cross: Reflections on Luther's Heidelberg Disputation, 1518 (1997)
- Theology Is for Proclamation (1990)
- Forensic Justification and Law in Lutheran Theology, Justification by Faith, Lutherans and Catholics in dialogue VI (1985)
- When the Old Gods Fail, Piety, Politics and Ethics, Reformation Studies in Honor of George Wolfgang Forell (1984)
- The Work of Christ and "Christian Life," Christian Dogmatics (1984)
- Justification by Faith: A Matter of Death and Life (1982)
- Where God Meets Man (1972)
- The Law-Gospel Debate (1969)

== Articles ==
- "Luther and the Jews." Lutheran Quarterly 27.2 (2013): 125-142.
- "The Freedom to Reform." Lutheran Quarterly 25.2 (2011): 167-175.
- "Satis est?: What Do We Mean When Other Churches Don't Agree?" Lutheran Quarterly 26.3 (2012): 322-324.
- "Lutheran Ecumenism: With Whom and How Much?" Lutheran Quarterly 17.4 (2003): 436-455.
- "The Lord's Supper as the Testament of Jesus." Word & World 17.1 (1997): 5-9.
- "What Finally to Do about the (Counter-) Reformation Condemnations." Lutheran Quarterly 11.1 (1997): 3-16.

== Other sources ==
- Forde, Marianna (2014) Gerhard O. Forde: A Life (Lutheran University Press) ISBN 978-1-932688-96-2
