= Luther Seminary =

Seminary in Saint Paul, Minnesota, U.S.

- Motto: Christus Lux Mundi
- Motto in English: Christ is the Light of the World
- Type: Seminary
- Established: 1869; 157 years ago
- Affiliations: Evangelical Lutheran Church in America
- Endowment: $142 million (2025)
- President: Rev. Dr. Robin Steinke
- Faculty: 21
- Students: 419
- Location: St. Paul & Lauderdale, Minnesota
- Website: www.luthersem.edu

Luther Seminary is a seminary of the Evangelical Lutheran Church in America (ELCA) in Saint Paul, Minnesota. It is the largest seminary of the ELCA. It also accepts and educates students of 41 other denominations and traditions. It is accredited by the Higher Learning Commission and the Association of Theological Schools. It also has theological accreditation through the ELCA as well as the United Methodist Church.

In 2025, the seminary announced its plan to sell its Saint Paul campus, citing a shift to online learning. It will relocate to a smaller location in downtown Minneapolis, starting in the summer of 2027.

- United Church Seminary
- U.S. National Register of Historic Places
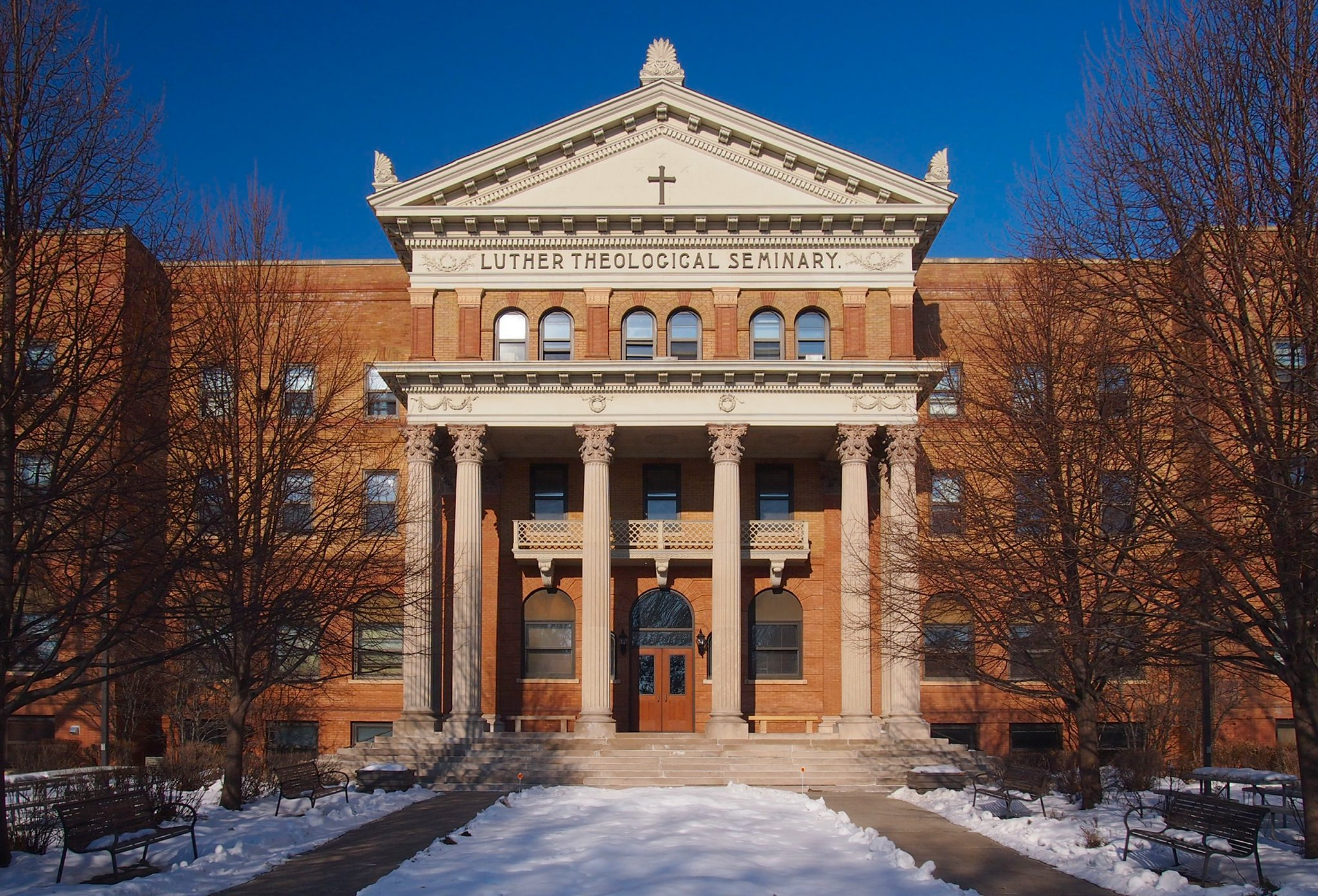

- Location within Minnesota Location within the United States
- Location: 2481 Como Avenue; Saint Paul, Minnesota
- Coordinates: 44°59′5″N 93°11′47″W
- Built: 1900
- Architect: Didrik A. Omeyer; Martin P. Thori
- NRHP reference No.: 85003437
- Added to NRHP: October 31, 1985

== History ==
Luther Seminary is the result of a series of mergers that consolidated what at one time were many separate institutions into one seminary.

=== Luther Theological Seminary (1917–1982) ===
In 1917, three Norwegian-American Lutheran churches united to create the Norwegian Lutheran Church of America (NLCA). Each of the three church bodies had operated a seminary. The Norwegian Synod's Luther Seminary in Saint Paul, Minnesota, had been founded in 1876; the Hauge Synod's Red Wing Seminary in Red Wing, Minnesota, in 1879; and the United Norwegian Lutheran Church's United Church Seminary in Saint Paul, in 1892. The merged seminaries occupied the site of the United Church Seminary because it was the most developed and elaborate, and retained the name of the oldest of the three schools, namely, Luther Theological Seminary. During the 19th century, there were a series of theological controversies among various Lutheran groups over the doctrine of election (or predestination). Luther Seminary was the result of a compromise--rather than split over the conflict, it was agreed that both sides of controversy would be vigorously articulated at Lutheran Seminary. That decision helped to form a culture at Luther in which theological disputation was seen as healthy. That ethos remains. Courses were originally taught in Norwegian; the slow transition the English was completed before World War II.

The NLCA took the name Evangelical Lutheran Church in 1946 and, with other churches, formed the American Lutheran Church (ALC) in 1960. In 1964 and 1965, three women were admitted to Luther Seminary, prior to the ALC's decision to ordain women in 1970.

The presidents of Luther Theological Seminary:

- Marcus Olaus Bockman (1892–1917) (United Church)
- Marcus Olaus Bockman (1917–1930)
- T. F. Gullixson (1930–1954)
- Alvin Rogness (1954–1974)
- Lloyd Svendsbye (1974–1982)

=== Augsburg Theological Seminary (1869–1963) ===
Augsburg Theological Seminary, later renamed Augsburg University, was founded in 1869 at Marshall, Wisconsin, later moved to Minneapolis, Minnesota, and in 1897 became the seminary of the Lutheran Free Church. It remained a separate seminary until 1963, at which time the Lutheran Free Church merged with the American Lutheran Church and Augsburg Seminary was merged with Luther Theological Seminary. The merged institution took the Luther Theological Seminary name and the 1869 founding date of Augsburg Seminary. Some Augsburg Seminary faculty joined Luther: Paul Sonnack, John Stensvaag, and Bernhard Christensen. Philip Quanbeck remained at Augsburg College.

=== Northwestern Lutheran Theological Seminary (1920–1982) ===
Northwestern Lutheran Theological Seminary traces its origin to the Chicago Lutheran Divinity School, begun in Chicago, Illinois, in 1920 following action taken by the English Evangelical Lutheran Synod of the Northwest, a synod of the United Lutheran Church in America. In 1921, the seminary was moved to Fargo, North Dakota, and the following year to Minneapolis. From 1921 to 1982, its name was Northwestern Lutheran Theological Seminary. Located in north Minneapolis from 1922 to 1940 and in south Minneapolis from 1940 to 1967, it moved near the campus of Luther Theological Seminary in Saint Paul in 1967. At the time of the formation of the Lutheran Church in America (LCA) in 1962, Northwestern Lutheran Theological Seminary was placed under the jurisdiction of two supporting synods: the Minnesota Synod and the Red River Valley Synod.

The presidents of Northwestern Lutheran Theological Seminary:

- Joseph Stump (1920–1935)
- Paul Roth (1935–1950)
- Jonas Dressler (1950–1957)
- Clemens Zeidler (1957–1976)
- Lloyd Svendsbye (1976–1982)

=== Luther Northwestern Theological Seminary/Luther Seminary (1982–present) ===
In order to make witness to a shared mission in theological education, Luther and Northwestern seminaries were functionally unified in 1976, under a single administration. After a period of six years, the two seminaries formally merged on July 1, 1982, as Luther Northwestern Theological Seminary. The first women faculty members joined the faculty in 1982 and 1984--Diane Jacobson and Gracia Grindal. Many more followed and currently the teaching faculty are 50% women and the president is a woman, Robin Steinke. As of 2026, approximately 55% of students are women.

On January 1, 1988, Luther Northwestern Theological Seminary became a seminary of the Evangelical Lutheran Church in America (ELCA) due to the merger of the LCA, the ALC, and the Association of Evangelical Lutheran Churches. The seminary's name was simplified to Luther Seminary on July 1, 1994.

On September 18, 2026, Luther Seminary announced the sale of its St. Paul campus with the seminary remaining in its current location through the end of the 2026–27 academic year. The seminary stated that the decision was not financially driven, but rather is to accommodate and adapt to changing methods of theological education. The St. Paul campus and its historic buildings are expected to still be used as an educational institution.

On October 14, 2026, Luther Seminary announced it had finalized a 23-year lease of a four-story building in downtown Minneapolis, at 1101 West River Parkway beginning on July 1, 2027. Luther Seminary will share the building with at least one other Lutheran ministry. The location is near the Stone Arch Bridge overlooking the Mississippi River. Construction and renovations of the new space to prepare it for academic use will take place starting in January, 2027. Student housing will be provided on the campus of nearby Augsburg University, a fellow ELCA institution.

The presidents of Luther Seminary (1982–1994 as Luther Northwestern Theological Seminary):

- Lloyd Svendsbye (1982–1987)
- Gib Fjellman (1987) (interim)
- David L. Tiede (1988–2005)
- Richard Bliese (2005–2012)
- Rick Foss (2012–2014) (interim)
- Robin Steinke (2014–present)

== Academics ==
In the 2026–27 academic year, Luther Seminary serves around 420 total students, employing 21 faculty. Luther offers a Master of Divinity degree (M.Div.) for students seeking ordination, as well as Master of Arts, Master of Theology, Doctor of Ministry (D.Min.), and Doctor of Philosophy (Ph.D.) degrees for other students. Luther Seminary also serves many learners through its non-degree programs and ministries, which include Working Preacher, Sermon Brainwave, Narrative Lectionary, Enter the Bible, Word & World, God Pause, and Faith+Lead. In the fall of 2013, Luther Seminary suspended new admissions to the Ph.D program for at least three years as part of budget cuts. The seminary reopened its Ph.D. program in the fall semester of 2018. The seminary has since returned to financial stability, reporting a budget surplus of $594,000 after fiscal year 2022.

As in most seminaries, M.Div. students complete three years of theological education, divided into a junior year (first), middler year (second) and senior year (final). A full year of internship, usually in a parish, is an integral part of pastoral training, and a requirement for ELCA M.Div. students. While individual situations may vary, internship typically begins after two-thirds of coursework has been completed.

=== Frederick Buechner ===
Luther Seminary had affiliations with the acclaimed American theologian and author, Frederick Buechner. In addition to being a key part of the curriculum, the works of Buechner have regularly been distributed by the seminary to its students. In 2014, Luther Seminary also instituted the Frederick Buechner Prize for Excellence in Preaching.

== Notable faculty ==
- Marcus Olaus Bøckmann
- Carl Braaten
- Gerhard Forde
- Terence E. Fretheim
- Roy Harrisville
- Richard A. Jensen
- Jacob Tanner

== Notable alumni ==
- Johan Arnd Aasgaard
- Lowell G. Almen
- Stuart E. Barstad
- Hilliard Dogbe
- Paul Egertson
- Gerhard Forde
- Mark Hanson
- Roy Harrisville
- Robert Jenson
- V. Trygve Jordahl
- Brian E. Konkol
- M. Victor Paul
- J. A. O. Preus II
- Fredrik A. Schiotz

== See also ==
- Norway Lutheran Church
