= George Blankenbaker =

American theologian

George Vernon Blankenbaker (born 1933) is an American Old Testament theologian and one of only three scholars who worked on both the original 1971 translation of the New American Standard Bible as well as the 1995 update. He is the author of The Language of Hosea 1-3. During his career, he served as vice-president and academic dean of Westmont College, where he currently serves as dean emeritus.
