= Marvin A. Sweeney =

American biblical scholar (born 1953)

Marvin Alan Sweeney (born 1953; raised in Decatur, Illinois) is Professor of Hebrew Bible at Claremont School of Theology (1994–present). Dr. Sweeney was trained under the tutelage of Rolf P. Knierim at the Claremont Graduate School, now known as the Claremont Graduate University. He was a Yad ha-Nadiv/Barecha Foundation Post-Doctoral Fellow in Jewish Studies at the Hebrew University of Jerusalem, where he worked with Moshe Greenberg (1989-1990); a Lilly Theological Research Grant Recipient (1997-1998); and a Fellow of the Summer Institute for Modern Israel Studies, sponsored by the American Jewish Committee and Brandeis University (2004). Sweeney previously taught in the Religious Studies Department and Judaic Studies Program at the University of Miami in Coral Gables, FL (1983-1994), and he has served as Dorot Research Professor at the W. F. Albright Institute in Jerusalem, Israel (1993-1994); Visiting Professor of Bible at the Hebrew Union College—Jewish Institute of Religion, Los Angeles, CA (1995-1996; 1999; 2003-2004); Underwood Professor of Divinity at Yonsei University in Seoul, Korea (2011); visiting scholar at Chang Jung Christian University in Tainan, Taiwan (2015); and Professor of Tanak at the Academy for Jewish Religion California, Los Angeles, CA (2000-2019). He also served on the faculty of Religion at Claremont Graduate University (1994–2018). During his years as a doctoral student, Sweeney served as Research Assistant, Research Associate, and Head Cataloguer at the Ancient Biblical Manuscript Center for Preservation and Research (1979-1983) and as Adjunct Instructor for the Intensive Summer Hebrew Course at the School of Theology at Claremont, now known as the Claremont School of Theology (1980, 1981). In 2019, Sweeney relocated to Salem, Oregon, due to the attempted transfer of Claremont School of Theology to Willamette University.

In March 1987, Sweeney travelled to Moscow and Leningrad (St. Petersburg) in the former Soviet Union to meet with Refuseniks, Jews who had been denied permission to leave the Soviet Union for Israel, the United States, and western Europe. He gave lectures on topics in Jewish studies, brought in books and medical supplies, and made reports to the South Florida Conference on Soviet Jewry concerning the status and needs of individuals and groups within the Soviet Union.

A specialist in Prophetic Literature, Historical Narrative, and Pentateuchal Studies, Sweeney is especially well known for developing the field of Jewish Biblical Theology and for critical studies on the synchronic, final literary form of the prophetic and narrative books of the Hebrew Bible and the diachronic history of their composition. He has served as President of the National Association of Professors of Hebrew (2017-2019); President of the Society of Biblical Literature South Eastern Region (1993–94); and President of the Society of Biblical Literature Pacific Coast Region (2001-2002).

Sweeney serves on the Board of Trustees, Temple Beth Sholom, Salem, Oregon.

== Education ==
- A.B. - University of Illinois at Urbana-Champaign (Political Science and Religious Studies, with distinction; 1975)
- Non-degree student - Princeton Theological Seminary (Biblical Hebrew, Koine Greek; 1975-1976)
- M.A. - Claremont Graduate University (Religion: Hebrew Bible; 1981)
- Ph.D. - Claremont Graduate University (Religion: Hebrew Bible; 1983)
- Non-degree student - The Hebrew University of Jerusalem (Modern Hebrew; 1988-1990)
- Yad ha-Nadiv/Barechah Foundation Post-doctoral Fellow in Jewish Studies - The Hebrew University of Jerusalem (Targumic Aramaic, Jewish Biblical Exegesis; 1989-1990)
- Fellow. Summer Institute of Israel Studies. Brandeis University and the American Jewish Committee (2004)

== Selected works ==
- The Eternal Covenant in the Hebrew Bible and Beyond (Oxford University Press, 2026)
- Exodus. Contextual Critical Commentary (Cascade Books, 2026)
- Isaiah, with Chris A. Franke. Fortress Commentary on the Bible (Fortress, 2026)
- An Introduction to Isaiah 1-39: A Foundational Prophetic Work (Cascade Books, 2025)
- 1-2 Samuel. New Cambridge Bible Commentary. (Cambridge University Press, 2023)
- Visions of the Holy: Studies in Biblical Theology and Literature. Resources for Biblical Study 105. (Society of Biblical Literature, 2023)
- Jewish Mysticism: From Ancient Times Through Today (Eerdmans, 2020)
- The Pentateuch. Core Biblical Studies (Abingdon, 2017)
- Isaiah 40–66. Forms of the Old Testament Literature. (Eerdmans, 2016)
- Reading Prophetic Books. Forschungen zum Alten Testament, 89. (Mohr Siebeck 2014)
- Reading Ezekiel. Reading the Old Testament. (Smyth & Helwys, 2013)
- TANAK: A Theological and Critical Introduction to the Jewish Bible. (Fortress, 2012)
- Reading the Hebrew Bible after the Shoah: Engaging Holocaust Theology (Fortress, 2008)
- I and II Kings: A Commentary. Old Testament Library. (Westminster John Knox, 2007)
- The Prophetic Literature. Interpreting Biblical Texts. (Abingdon, 2005)
- Form and Intertextuality in Prophetic and Apocalyptic Literature. Forschungen zum Alten Testament, 45 (Mohr Siebeck, 2005)
- Zephaniah: A Commentary. Hermeneia. (Fortress, 2003)
- King Josiah of Judah: The Lost Messiah of Israel (Oxford University Press, 2001) According to WorldCat, the book is held in 601 libraries
- The Twelve Prophets. Berit Olam. (2 vols.; Liturgical, 2000)
- Isaiah 1-39. Forms of the Old Testament Literature, 16. (Eerdmans, 1996)
- Isaiah 1-4 and the Post-Exilic Understanding of the Isaianic Tradition. Beihefte zur Zeitschrift für die alttestamentliche Wissenschaft, 171 (Walter de Gruyter, 1988)
