= Roy Harrisville =

American Lutheran theologian (1922–2023)

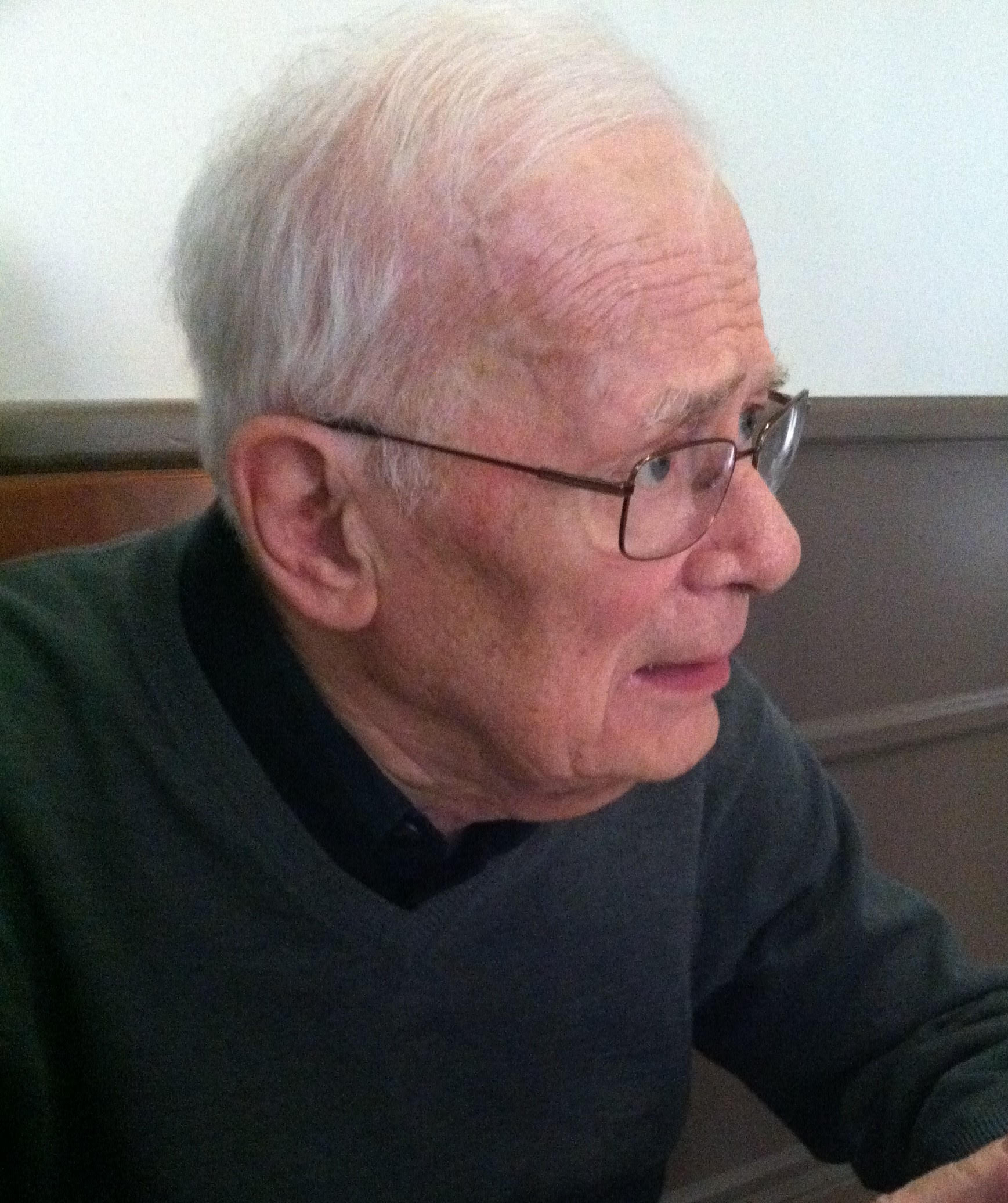
- Harrisville in 2021

Personal life
- Born: April 22, 1922 Oconomowoc, Wisconsin, United States
- Died: July 25, 2023 (aged 101) Saint Paul, Minnesota, United States
- Spouse: Norma Haggerty (m. 1951)
- Education: Concordia College (B.A.); Luther Seminary (M.Div.); Princeton University (Ph.D.)

Religious life
- Religion: Christianity
- Denomination: Lutheranism
- Ordination: 1949

Roy Alvin Harrisville II (April 22, 1922 – July 25, 2023) was an American Lutheran theologian who wrote extensively on the interpretation of the New Testament.

== Early life and education ==
Harrisville was born on April 22, 1922, in Oconomowoc, WI. He was educated at Concordia College in Moorhead, Minnesota (B.A. in 1994), Luther Theological Seminary in Saint Paul, Minnesota(M.Div. in 1947), Princeton Seminary in Princeton, New Jersey (PhD in 1953), and the University of Tübingen in Tübingen, Germany. He married Norma Alice Haggerty on December 22, 1951, at the age of 29.

== Career and ministries ==
He was ordained at Bethelem Lutheran in Minneapolis, Minnesota, in 1949; he served as interim pastor at Bethelem Lutheran from 1949 to 1950, and later as pastor in Mason City, Iowa from 1952 to 1957. Harrisville joined the faculty of Luther Theological Seminary as a professor of New Testament from 1958 to 1992. During his tenure at Luther Seminary, Harrisville received the Lutheran World Federation Scholarship, the Association of Theological Schools Fellowship, and the Fredrik A. Schoitz Fellowship. He co-founded Dialog, A Journal of Theology and was a member of the Society of Biblical Literature, the Studiorum Novi Testamenti Societas, the American Association of University Professors, and honorary member of the Teologiske Menighetsfakultet. Additionally, he was delegate to the Lutheran World Federation in Geneva, Switzerland, from 1957 to 1958. He served on the Board of Regents at Luther College in Decorah, Iowa, from 1954 to 1966.

Sabbaticals:

1. Tübingen, Germany 1957-1958
2. Tübingen, Germany 1957-1958
3. New Haven, CT (Yale) 1964-1965
4. Cambridge, England 1971-1972
5. Middlebury, VT 1977-1978
6. Tübingen, Germany 1985-1986

== Influence ==
Harrisville's view on the nature of scripture and the interaction between human writers and the Holy Spirit helped shape the preaching and theology of Lutherans in North America for over 40 years. His works include The Bible in Modern Culture: Baruch Spinoza to Brevard Childs with Walter Sundberg and Fracture: The Cross as Irreconcilable in the Language and Thought of the Biblical Writers. Harrisville believed the historical critical method could be used in service of the Gospel. His long friendship with German theologian Ernst Käsemann led to several translations and reviews of Käsemann's work. Their correspondence can be found in the University of Tübingen Library and in the Luther Seminary Archives.

== Publications ==
Books:

1. The Scriptural Significance of the Concepts "Light" and "Darkness" in the Old Testament. Luther Theological Seminary Thesis (unpublished, 1947).
2. God Incognito: A Series of Lenten Sermons on the Passion according to St. John (Minneapolis: Augsburg, 1956).
3. The Concept of Newness in the New Testament (Minneapolis: Augsburg, 1960).
4. Kerygma and History: A Symposium on the Theology of Rudolf Bultmann. Selected, translated and edited by Carl E. Braaten and Roy A. Harrisville (Nashville: Abingdon, 1962).
5. The Historical Jesus and the Kerygmatic Christ: Essays on the New Quest of the Historical Jesus. Translated and edited by Carl E. Braaten and Roy A. Harrisville (Nashville: Abingdon, 1964).
6. His Hidden Grace: The Origins, Task and Witness of Biblical Criticism (Nashville: Abingdon, 1965).
7. The Miracle of Mark: A Study in the Gospel (Minneapolis: Augsburg, 1967).
8. Pick Up Your Trumpet (Minneapolis: Augsburg, 1970).
9. Play On Your Harp: Meditations on Biblical Themes (Minneapolis: Augsburg, 1975).
10. Frank Chamberlain Porter: Pioneer in American Biblical Interpretation (Missoula: Scholars Press, 1976).
11. Benjamin Wisner Bacon: Pioneer in American Biblical Criticism (Missoula: Scholars Press, 1976).
12. Romans: Augsburg Commentary on the New Testament (Minneapolis: Augsburg, 1980).
13. Holy Week: Proclamation 2, Series B: Aids for Interpreting the Lessons of the Church Year, with Charles D. Hackett (Philadelphia: Fortress, 1981).
14. Holy Week: Proclamation 3, Series C (Philadelphia: Fortress, 1984).
15. First Corinthians: Augsburg Commentary on the New Testament (Minneapolis: Augsburg, 1987).
16. Ministry in Crisis (Minneapolis: Augsburg, 1987).
17. The Bible and Modern Culture, with Walter Sundberg (Eerdmans: 1995).
18. The Bible and Modern Culture, trans. Korean.
19. New Proclamation, Series A, 1999, Augsburg-Fortress.
20. Second Edition, The Bible and Modern Culture, Eerdmans: 2002.
21. Fracture, The Cross as Irreconcilable in the Language and Thought of the Biblical Writers, Eerdmans, 2006
22. Pandora's Box Opened, Eerdmans, 2014.
23. That Reminds Me: A Memoir. MN: Eclipse Press, 2020 (Kindle Publishing).
24. The Story of Jesus: A Mozaic, Eugene, OR: Wipf & Stock, 2020.
25. "Biblical Interpretation and the Interpretation of Natural Phenomena" in Talking God in Society, Festchrift for Peter Lampe, ed. Ute E. Eisen and Heidrun E. Mader, Vol I, 91-112, Göttingen: Vandenhoeck & Ruprecht, 2020.
26. Tell It on the Mountain: A Collection of Sermons, St. Paul, MN: Eclipse Press, 2021 (KDP/Amazon Publishing).
27. A Brief Guide to New Testament Interpretation: History, Methods, and Practical Examples. Eugene, OR: Wipf & Stock, 2022.
28. Take Every Thought Captive: A Small Book of Devotionals. St. Paul, MN: Eclipse Press, 2023 (KDP/Amazon Publishing; posthumous)

Translations:

1. "Behold, I Make All Things New!" by Peter Stuhlmacher, Lutheran World. 15 (1968): 3-15.
2. Mark The Evangelist: Studies on the Redaction History of the Gospel, by Willi Marxsen. Translated with James Boyce, Donald Juel and William Poehlmann (Nashville: Abingdon, 1969).
3. The Problem of Miracle in Primitive Christianity, by Anton Fridrichsen. Translated with John S. Hanson (Minneapolis: Augsburg, 1972).
4. "The Christology of Chalcedon in Ecumenical Discussion," by Edmund Schlink, Dialog. 2 (Spring, 1963).
5. "A Protestant View of the Vatican Council Schema 'De Ecclesia,'" by Edmund Schlink, Dialog. 3 (Spring 1964).
6. Historical Criticism and Theological Interpretation of Scripture, by Peter Stuhlmacher (Philadelphia: Forgress, 1977).
7. The Influence of the Holy Spirit: The Popular View of the Apostolic Age and the Teaching of the Apostle Paul, by Hermann Gunkel. (Philadelphia: Fortress, 1979).
8. "The Signs of an Apostle: Paul's Miracles;" "The Center of Scripture in Luke;" "The Circumcised Messiah;" "The Daughters of Abraham: Women in Acts," The Unknown Paul, by Jacob Jervell (Minneapolis: Augsburg, 1984).
9. The Wandering People of God, by Ernst Käsemann. Translated with Irving L. Sandberg (Minneapolis: Augsburg, 1984).
10. The Second Letter to the Corinthians, by Rudolf Bultmann (Minneapolis: Augsburg, 1985).
11. The Freedom of a Christian, by Eberhard Jüngel (Minneapolis: Augsburg, 1988).
12. Rudolf Bultmann, What Is Theology, Fortress 1998.
13. Translation of Käsemann's 1937 sermon (1999 unpublished).
14. Translation of Käsemann's Rückblick for Dialog, Vol. 38, Spring 1999.
15. Bernard Lohse, Luther's Theology, Fortress. 2000.
16. Translation of Udo Snelle essay
17. The Theology of Facts versus the Theology of Rhetoric: Confession and Defense, trans. with notes by Roy A. Harrisville, introduction by Walter Sundberg (Fort Wayne: Lutheran Legacy, 2008).
18. Translation of Käsemann's On Being a Disciple of the Crucified Nazarene, Eerdmans.
19. Translation with Mark Mattes of Johann Georg Hamann, Eerdmans. Feb. 2011
20. Translation of Oswald Bayer essay (2011 unpublished).
21. Translation of Käsemann's Kirchliche Konflikte, Baker Book House, 2021.
22. Luther's Theology: A Translation of Hans Joachim Iwand's Posthumous Works. OR: Wipf & Stock, 2025.
