= Robert Polzin =

Robert Polzin is a biblical scholar. He is Professor Emeritus at Carleton University, and has degrees from the University of San Diego and Harvard University.

Polzin is best known for a series of volumes in which he attempted a "synchronic, literary reading of the Deuteronomic History." These were Moses and the Deuteronomist (1980), Samuel and the Deuteronomist (1989), and David and the Deuteronomist (1993).

Polzin has also made a significant contribution to the study of Biblical Hebrew. Dong-Hyuk Kim argues that the methods Polzin developed in his 1976 study Late Biblical Hebrew: Toward an Historical Typology of Biblical Hebrew Prose have since been employed by a younger generation of scholars.
