= Gerhard von Rad =

German biblical scholar, Old Testament professor, and Lutheran theologian

- Born: 21 October 1901; Nuremberg, Kingdom of Bavaria, German Empire
- Died: 31 October 1971 (aged 70); Heidelberg, West Germany
- Education: University of Erlangen; University of Tübingen
- Church: Confessing Church
- Writings: The Problem of the Hexateuch and Other Essays (1938); Genesis: A Commentary (1949-1953); Old Testament Theology (1958-1960)
- Offices held: Professor of Old Testament, University of Heidelberg
- Title: Reverend Doctor

Gerhard von Rad (21 October 1901 – 31 October 1971) was a German academic, Old Testament scholar, Lutheran theologian, exegete, and professor at the University of Heidelberg.

== Early life, education, career ==
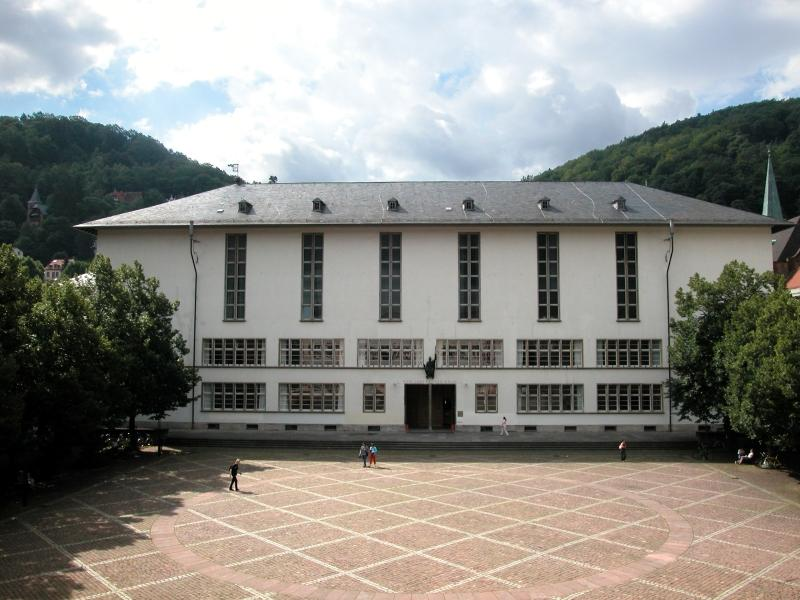
The University of Heidelberg, where von Rad taught.

Gerhard von Rad was born in Nuremberg, Bavaria, to Lutheran parents. His family were part of the patrician class. He was educated at the University of Erlangen and further at the University of Tübingen.

In 1925, he became a curate in the Lutheran Landeskirche (i.e. the church in the federal state) of Bavaria. Later, he taught at the University of Erlangen in 1929 as tutor. In 1930 he was a privatdozent at the University of Leipzig. From 1934 to 1945 he served as a professor at the University of Jena and later at the University of Göttingen from 1945 to 1949. After that, he became Professor of Old Testament at the Ruprecht Karl University of Heidelberg in the state of Baden-Württemberg and taught there until his death in 1971.

He was conferred honorary doctorates from the University of Lund, Sweden and the University of Wales, United Kingdom.

=== Oral tradition and the Pentateuch ===
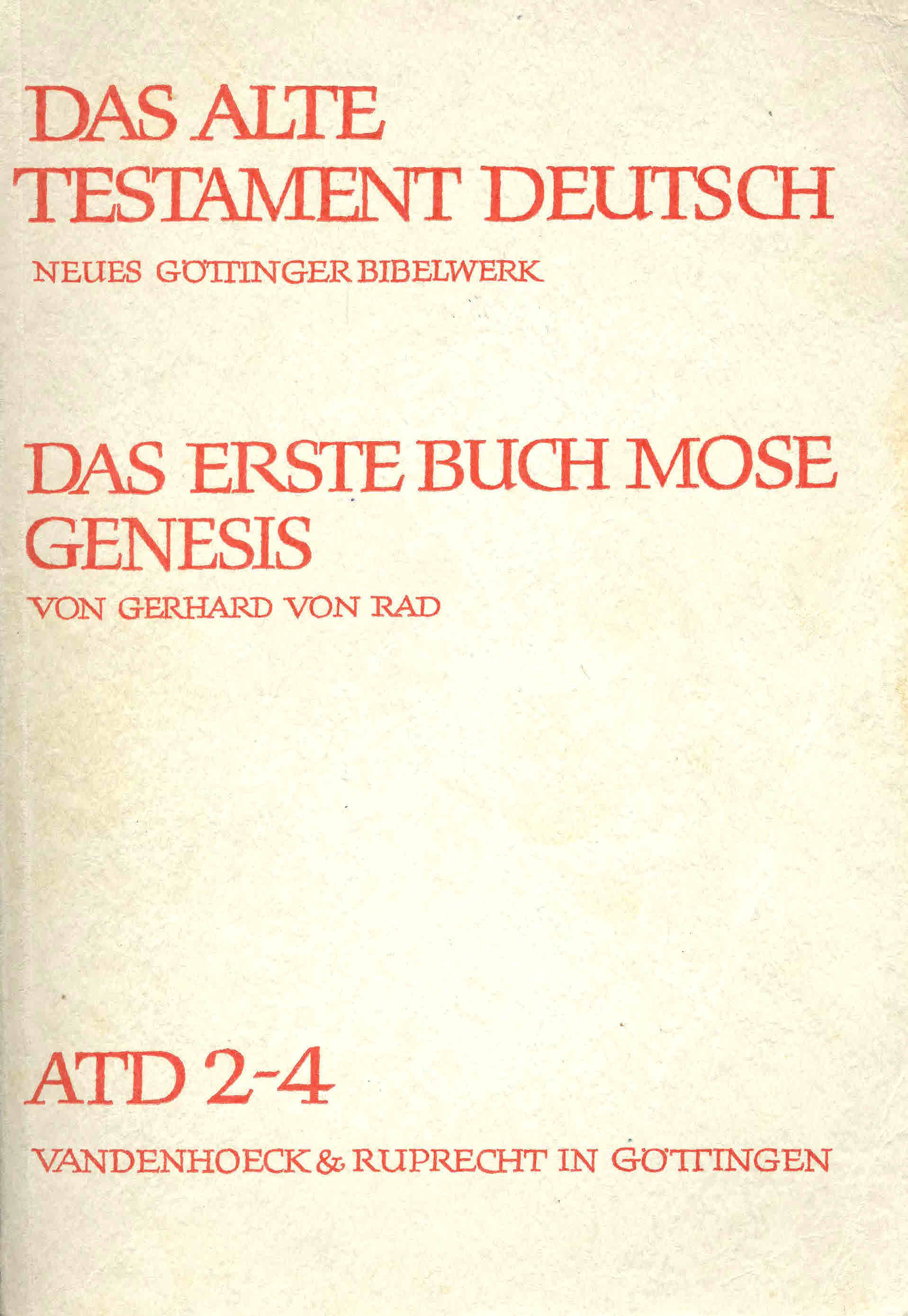
Cover of the 1972 German edition of von Rad's Commentary on Genesis, highly regarded among religious scholars as "one of the finest examples of theological interpretation of the Old Testament which has been produced during the period following the Second World War".

Along with German biblical scholar Martin Noth, Gerhard von Rad applied form criticism, originated by Hermann Gunkel, to the documentary hypothesis.

Nazi Germany's anti-Semitism led to an "anti-Old Testament" bias among German scholars. Disturbed by this, von Rad turned to the study of the Old Testament and gradually started to bring back its message.

His lively papers achieved a renewal of interest and research in Old Testament studies. Along with Martin Noth, he applied research into the Pentateuch's oral tradition to the explanation of its origin.

In 1960, von Rad traveled to the United States where he was a visiting scholar at Princeton Theological Seminary. He was greatly influential during this period. While at Princeton, he took on Richard A. Jensen as an understudy, who would also further his research and application.

== Death ==
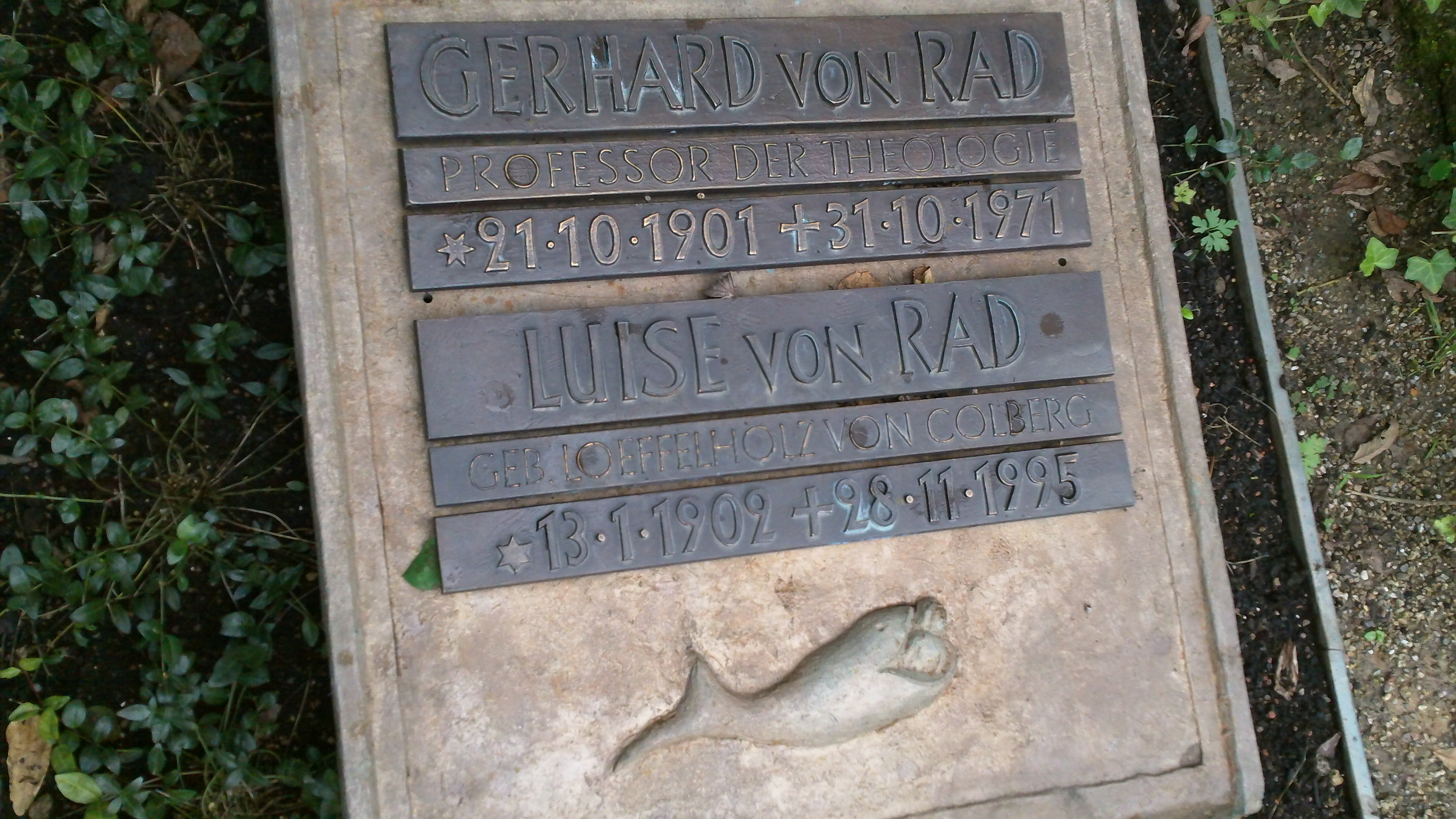
Gerhard von Rad's grave

Gerhard von Rad and his wife are buried in Heidelberg's "Handschuhsheim Cemetery". Archived from the original on 2012-04-02. On their gravestone is minimalist artwork depicting Jonah emerging from the great fish, an Old Testament symbol of resurrection.

== Selected works ==
=== Publications ===
- The Problem of the Hexateuch and other essays ISBN 0-334-01310-0
- Genesis: A Commentary (Old Testament Library) ISBN 0-664-20957-2
- Deuteronomy: A Commentary (Old Testament Library) ISBN 0-664-20734-0
- Studies in Deuteronomy (Studies in Biblical theology) ASIN B0007JWYNA
- Old Testament Theology ISBN 0-334-01182-5
- Old Testament Theology, One-Volume Edition ISBN 1-56563-652-X
- The Message of the Prophets: Old Testament Theology ISBN 0-334-01005-5
- Holy War in Ancient Israel ISBN 0-85244-208-4
- Das Alte Testament Deutsch (ATD), Tlbd.2/4, Das erste Buch Mose, Genesis ISBN 3-525-51112-4 (This textbook series of detailed theological commentaries on individual books of the bible translates as "The Old Testament [in] German"; the volume is on the book of Genesis)
- God at work in Israel ISBN 0-687-14960-6
- Biblical interpretations in preaching ISBN 0-687-03444-2
- Gottes Wirken in Israel: Vorträge zum Alten Testament ISBN 3-7887-0404-7 ("God's acting in Israel: [public] lectures on the Old Testament")
- Wisdom in Israel ISBN 0-687-45756-4 (translation of the German book below ?)
- The message of the prophets ASIN B0006C6BA0
- Weisheit in Israel ASIN B000E1Q3CY ("Wisdom in Israel")
- Theologie des Alten Testaments (Einführung in die evangelische Theologie) ASIN B0007JBBTI ("Theology of the Old Testament"/ series title: "Introduction into 'evangelisch'[e] theology" ["evangelisch" in German is used in a similar sense as "Protestant" in English, but has other connotations; hence it is not directly translatable; it usually refers to lutheran or closely related faith and theology, or Christians adhering to it)
- Basileia (Bible Key Words from Gerhard Kittel's Theologisches Wörterbuch zum Neuen Testament) ASIN B000BGT0RW
- Theologie des Alten Testaments, Bd. 2. ISBN 3-579-05003-6 (vol.2 of the title above)
- Kaiser Taschenbücher, Bd.1, Theologie des Alten Testaments. Die Theologie der geschichtlichen Überlieferungen Israels. ISBN 3-579-05002-8 ("Kaiser [publisher's name] pocketbooks, vol.1, "Theology of the Old Testament. Theology of the historical tradition of Israel")
- Das Alte Testament Deutsch (ATD), Tlbd.8 : Das fünfte Buch Mose (Deuteronomium) ISBN 3-525-51136-1 (the volume on the book Deuteronomium of the series mentioned above)
- Erinnerungen aus der Kriegsgefangenschaft, Frühjahr 1945 ISBN 3-7887-0507-8 ("Memories of a prisoner of war, spring 1945")
- Predigt-Meditationen ISBN 3-525-60237-5 ("Sermon meditations")
- Eirene (Pocket crammer series) ASIN B0007FP9LI
- Origin of the concept of the day of Yahweh ASIN B0007JF2HA
- From Genesis to Chronicles: Explorations in Old Testament Theology ISBN 0-8006-3718-6 (review)

== Scholarly impact ==
- Victor Premasagar, a Cambridge tripos and past Principal of the Andhra Christian Theological College, Secunderabad, India in introducing critical methods and tools used in Biblical interpretation writes about von Rad as:
  .....a major contributor to Old Testament studies following the literary-critical tradition of Wellhausen and the form-critical and the traditio-historical approach of Hermann Gunkel as developed by Albrecht Alt and Martin Noth.

Prof. Premasagar concludes by saying that

the Bible for von Rad, in the final analysis, is neither history nor literature, but rather the confessions of a community.

- Henning Graf Reventlow of Ruhr University, North Rhine-Westphalia, Germany in introducing a book by von Rad, makes the following observations:
  ...a number of von Rad's innovative papers prepared the way for the blossoming of Old Testament studies in Germany during the first decennia after the Second World War.
- Gerhard Hasel of the Seventh-day Adventist Theological Seminary of Andrews University, Michigan, United States in writing about the approaches to OT studies, mentions von Rad with the words....,
  A new methodological approach for OT theology, one that deserves to be put in a class by itself, is that of Gerhard von Rad. His OT theology needs to be understood as the theology of the historical and prophetic traditions.
- John H. Hayes, Professor at Candler School of Theology of the Emory University in Atlanta, United States writes about von Rad...
  In his theology, with its challenge of previous methodologies and with its new proposals, von Rad (1901-71) inaugurated a new epoch in the study of Old Testament theology. He argued against any organization of Old Testament theology along the lines of central concepts, pervasive topics, assumed structures of Israelite thought or world of faith, or systematic theological categories which had been characteristic, in one way or another, of all the theologies of the twentieth century since this was to impose an alien structure on the material.
- G. Henton Davies, past Principal, Regent's Park College, a Permanent Private Hall of Oxford University, Oxford, England, writes about von Rad thus
  Gerhard Von Rad has been a regular contributor to Old Testament studies since 1929, although his main works were published between 1947 and 1960. His major writings include his studies on Deuteronomy; his commentary on Genesis; his two volumes of Theology of the Old Testament and a representative selection of his essays, extending from 1931 through 1964, which were translated and published as The Problem of the Hexateuch and other Essays in 1966, though the bulk of these were written in the late 1940s.

== See also ==
- Book of Deuteronomy
- Biblical Criticism, Form Criticism
- Martin Noth
- Deuteronomistic History and Deuteronomist
- Dr. Klaus Koch, D.D., Professor Emeritus of Old Testament and History of the Ancient near East Religions at the University of Hamburg, Hamburg, Germany
- Richard A. Jensen former apprentice of Gerhard von Rad
- Andhra Christian Theological College, Secunderabad, Andhra Pradesh, India
- Books of Chronicles
