= Antony F. Campbell =

New Zealand Old Testament scholar (1934–2020)

Antony Francis Campbell SJ (24 August 1934 – 2 August 2020) was a Jesuit priest and an Old Testament scholar. He was born in Christchurch, New Zealand and attended Selwyn House School. He was educated at St Patrick's College, Silverstream. Soon after leaving school he entered the Jesuits and studied at the University of Melbourne, the Faculty of Theology at Lyon-Fourvière, the Pontifical Biblical Institute, and Claremont Graduate School. For 40 years, he taught at the United Faculty of Theology in Melbourne.

Campbell specialised in the Book of Samuel: his works include a study on the ark narrative (The Ark Narrative (1 Sam 4-6; 2 Sam 6): A Form-critical and Traditio-historical Study, 1975), and commentaries on both 1 Samuel and 2 Samuel. His 1986 book Of Prophets and Kings: A Late Ninth-Century Document (1 Samuel 1-2 Kings 10) contains the "most comprehensive examination so far" of pre-Deuteronomistic composition in Samuel and Kings.
