= Miley Save Fuzzy =

Website and internet campaign

Miley Save Fuzzy is a website in which an anonymous Miley Cyrus fan threatened to kill and eat their pet cat unless she returns to Twitter. Miley Cyrus is aware of the campaign, and commented about it in several interviews, in which she stated that she will not come back to Twitter.

== MileySaveFuzzy.com ==
The website was created on October 24, 2009. On the website, the anonymous fan claimed that if Miley Cyrus did not come back to Twitter by November 16 (a deadline which was later extended to November 22), their cat, Fuzzy, would be killed and eaten. The fan claimed this action is legal in their country. The website includes several pictures of Fuzzy, as well as a cat recipes section.

On November 23, 2009, the Miley Cyrus fan posted a new update on the website, named Fuzzy's Demise, claiming that the cat is dead. The fan claimed that the cat was taken to a clinic and was euthanized, and was later eaten. A very detailed explanation of the entire process is described, and pictures of a supposedly dead Fuzzy were posted.

Shortly after the update was announced, there were difficulties accessing the website. An error page showed up, presumably due to the large number of hits it received, causing bandwidth issues.

== Public response and legitimacy ==
The website received media attention throughout the United States and in other countries, such as Spain, Romania and others. The campaign was also mentioned on various radio stations across the globe.

People working against the site have contacted organizations such as PETA and The Humane Society, who responded on their official forums and by email, saying that nothing can be done, as 'no' crime is being committed.
