= Japanese Women Don't Get Old or Fat =

Book about Japanese nutrition

Japanese Women Don't Get Old Or Fat: Secrets of my Mother's Tokyo Kitchen
- Author: Naomi Moriyama and William Doyle
- Genre: Japanese cooking; Cookbook; Food habits
- Publisher: Bantam Dell
- Publication date: November 2005
- Media type: Available as: softcover; hardcover; ebook; audiobook
- ISBN: 0-385-33997-6

Japanese Women Don't Get Old Or Fat: Secrets of my Mother's Tokyo Kitchen is a book written by Naomi Moriyama and co-written by her husband William Doyle. The book briefly describes how the current obesity epidemic is expanding globally, and then highlights facts about the Japanese obesity rate, and the how Japanese people have the lowest rates of obesity in the developed world, the longest life expectancies of any country in the world, and low rates of heart disease. The book also teaches home-style Japanese cuisine, and provides information about essential everyday ingredients in a typical Japanese home, along with recipes. Naomi Moriyama also states how Japanese women have, in general, a healthy outlook on food.

Moriyama features her mother's cooking techniques.

== Overview ==
=== Introduction ===
Discusses the global obesity epidemic and states how Japan has the lowest obesity rate and longest life expectancy in the world. Then explains that these great health outcomes are due to the Japanese diet.

== Reception ==
Jennifer Howard of AARP: The Magazine stated that the author "works hard to demystify key ingredients in Japanese cooking".

== Publishing data ==
Moriyama, Naomi; William Doyle (2005). Japanese Women Don't Get Old Or Fat. Delacorte Press. pp. 288. ISBN 0-385-33997-6.
