= Pastel de Gloria =

Colombian puff pastry

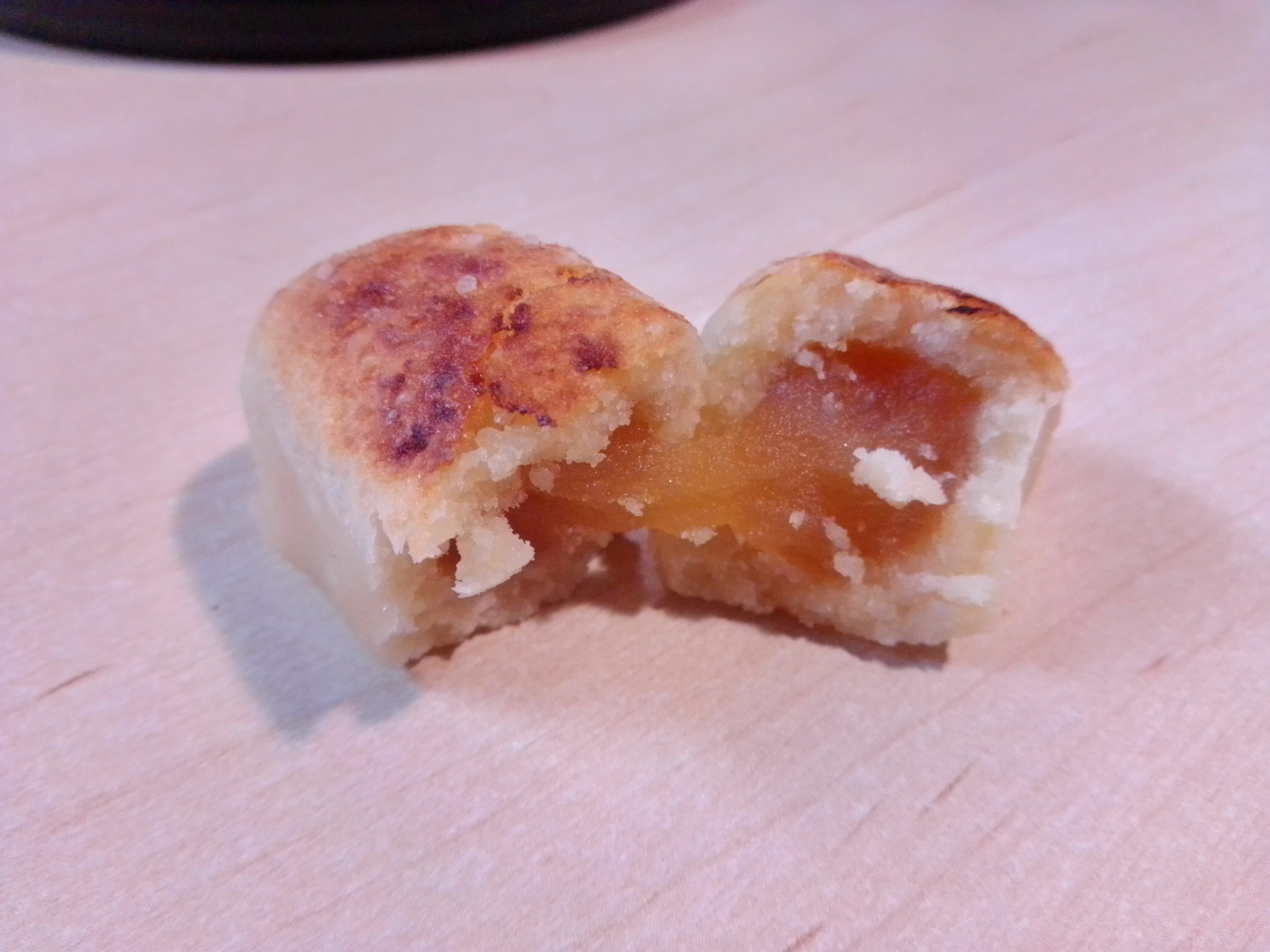
A pastel de gloria

A pastel de Gloria (plural: pasteles de Gloria), Gloria cake, or glory cake is a puff pastry generally containing guava jelly or guava paste inside, sprinkled with granulated sugar. They can alternatively be filled with almonds, cheese, or dulce de leche. Because of their appearance, they are also known by other names such as "cow's teat" and "tetillas de monja" ("nun's nipple").

Pasteles de gloria are believed to have an Arabic origin, and variants are found in southeast Spain, where they are often served around Christmas. They are a popular dessert in Colombian cuisine.

== In popular media ==
Pasteles de gloria are mentioned in Federico García Lorca's play Doña Rosita the Spinster.

== See also ==
- Nun's puffs
- Puff pastry
