= Nun's Farts =

French-Canadian desert

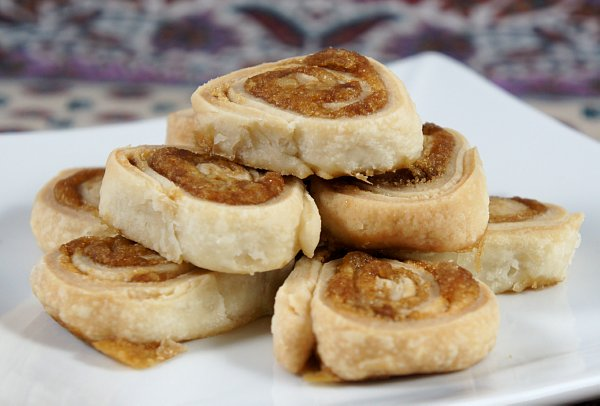

Nun's farts (French: pets de sœur) is a French Canadian dessert that is made from pie dough; often from left over Tourtière dough, that is layered with butter and brown sugar, then rolled, sliced, placed in a pan, covered with additional brown sugar, and finally baked. It is called Pets de Soeur (lit. "Nun's Farts") as it was served by nuns at Catholic schools in some parts of Quebec and Acadia.

In Quebec and French-speaking Canada, they are often served during the Christmas holidays and may be served as part of a réveillon, a family gathering on Christmas Eve. Variations may replace the brown sugar with molasses, caramel sauce or maple syrup; however, this is not common nor traditional.

== See also ==
- Cuisine of Quebec
- Canadian cuisine
- Acadian cuisine
- Nun's puffs
