= The Suffering of God =

1984 book by Terence E. Fretheim

The Suffering of God: An Old Testament Perspective is a book by Old Testament scholar Terence E. Fretheim. In 1984 it appeared as number 14 in the Overtures to Biblical Theology series published by Fortress Press.

== Summary and review ==
In The Suffering of God: An Old Testament Perspective, Terence E. Fretheim argues that incarnation has always been God's standard method of interaction with humanity. Fretheim seeks to balance the image of God as wrathful judge or cold lawgiver with an image of God in relationship with humanity. According to Fretheim, God suffers because He has completely and intimately bound Himself in relation to the created world, especially His people Israel.

Fretheim defends his thesis by claiming that "metaphors matter" and appealing to biblical images of an immanent deity. For him, the most significant metaphors for God in the Old Testament are anthropomorphic. If man is created in the image of God, he argues, then we have "permission to reverse the process and, by looking at the human, learn what God is like" (p. 11). The human metaphor is presented as the dominant expression of God's nature and character. The author says that many aspects of humanity are not appropriate for describing God. Sexuality, death, sinfulness, etc. are aspects of human nature that should not be ascribed to God.

The human metaphor has been neglected in Fretheim's opinion, but he sees feminist theology, liberation / Black theology, and the theological response to catastrophic events of the twentieth century as positive responses to this neglect.

=== Summary ===
The first traditional view that Fretheim opposes is the idea of divine transcendence. He argues that both the monarchical and organismic views are present in scripture, but that the organismic, immanent image is dominant. This "relationship of reciprocity" (p. 35) between God and the world is the foundation for all of Fretheim's conclusions. God affects and is affected by the world He has created, and this relationship is key to understanding what kind of God He is.

The second widely held position that Fretheim challenges is the doctrine of divine omniscience. (chapter 4) Fretheim argues against a view (at least in the Old Testament) which classifies omniscience as one of God's fundamental characteristics. Divine foreknowledge, he believes, is limited because of God's relationship with creation. There is no doubt, he says, that God always knows what He will do in the future, but He does not always know what free moral agents outside of Himself will do. For Fretheim, the widespread use of words like "perhaps" and "if" in divine speech point to a lack of certainty in God's mind about the future. Fretheim also addresses the issue of God's presence in the world. While acknowledging that God is everywhere at all times in a structural or general presence, Fretheim describes what he calls, the "intensification of the divine presence." This intensity of presence can be affected positively or negatively by human beings. Fretheim argues that sin drives away God (as in Ezekiel 8:6) and actually results in the intensification of divine presence in the form of God's wrath. Conversely, righteousness or "receptiveness" can move God to draw near.

In chapter 6, Fretheim describes the appearances of God in the Old Testament and the human reaction to them. To Fretheim, the spoken word delivered by God is no more important than the appearance itself, the visible word, as he calls it. He suggests that modern theologians need to broaden their understanding of the Word of God to include the visual aspects of revelation as well as the spoken/written word. Fretheim examines several different Old Testament theophanies noting their similarities and differences before coming to his conclusion: All theophanies involve God taking on human form (chapter 6). According to Fretheim, the consistent use of human form shows God's vulnerability. It proves that there is nothing fundamentally ungodly about the human form, and it shows that "the finite form is capable of the infinite." (p. 102) In wrestling with the theological implications of such a statement, Fretheim questions whether God uses the human form for the sake of appearances or whether there is a fundamental continuity between the two. He argues for the latter position, and argues that God is fundamentally connected to His creation and that He is fundamentally vulnerable because of this relationship. This leads to his actual discussion of the suffering of God. Fretheim describes God as suffering because of His creation (chapter 7), for His creation (chapter 8), and with His creation (chapter 9).

The final chapter of Fretheim's book deals with the special relationship between the suffering God and His suffering servants, the prophets. According to Fretheim, in men like Jeremiah, the divine word is incarnated to the point that the prophet shares in the divine suffering and God shares in the prophets suffering. The lives of the prophets are tied up in the divine life to the point that they embody the word of God in their lives as well as their words. The suffering servant in Isaiah experiences the same phenomenon as prophets like Moses and Jeremiah, but in him, Fretheim sees another level intensification of presence. Fretheim acknowledges that in the Old Testament God Himself did not become completely incarnate in an entire human life. That act is reserved for the incarnation of Jesus Christ, but Fretheim sees it, not as something radically new, but as "the culmination of a long-standing relationship of God with the world that is much more widespread in the OT than is commonly recognized."

=== Published reviews ===
- Bellefontaine, Elizabeth. Review of The Suffering of God: An Old Testament Perspective, by Terence E. Fretheim. Horizons 13 (Spring 1986): 151–153.
- Harr, Murray J. Review of The Suffering of God: An Old Testament Perspective, by Terence E. Fretheim. Theology Today 42 (April 1985): 140–142.
- Luker, Lamontte. Review of The Suffering of God: An Old Testament Perspective, by Terence E. Fretheim. Currents in Theology and Mission 12 (December 1985) 376–378.
- Patrick, Dale. Review of The Suffering of God: An Old Testament Perspective, by Terence E. Fretheim. Word and World 5 (Fall 1985): 444–445.
- Theiss, Norman. Review of The Suffering of God: An Old Testament Perspective, by Terence E. Fretheim. Interpretation 40, no. 1 (January 1986): 81–82.
- Ward, James M. Review of The Suffering of God: An Old Testament Perspective, by Terence E. Fretheim. Journal of Biblical Literature 105, no. 3 (Summer 1986): 516–518.
- White, John B. Review of The Suffering of God: An Old Testament Perspective, by Terence E. Fretheim. Journal of the American Academy of Religion 54, no. 3 (Fall 1986): 578–579.

== See also ==
- Abraham Joshua Heschel
- Jürgen Moltmann
- Kazoh Kitamori
