= Rhyming recipe =

A rhyming recipe is a recipe expressed in the form of a rhyming poem. Now mainly a curiosity, rhyming recipes were a common expedient for homemakers to memorize recipes in the late 19th and early 20th century.

== Example: Sydney Smith's recipe for salad dressing ==
As an example, here is a poem that provides a recipe for salad dressing. The poem was written by Sydney Smith, an English writer and clergyman, a wit and a liberal reformer, who is also known for being one of the founders of the Edinburgh Review.

The poem is as follows:

Two boiled potatoes, strained through a kitchen sieve,
Softness and smoothness to the salad give;
Of mordant mustard take a single spoon—
Distrust the condiment that bites too soon;
Yet deem it not, thou man of taste, a fault,
To add a double quantity of salt.
Four times the spoon with oil of Lucca crown,
And twice with vinegar procured from town;
True taste requires it, and your poet begs
The pounded yellow of two well-boiled eggs.
Let onions' atoms lurk within the bowl,
And, scarce suspected, animate the whole;
And lastly in the flavoured compound toss
A magic spoonful of anchovy sauce.
Oh, great and glorious! oh, herbaceous meat!
'Twould tempt the dying anchorite to eat.
Back to the world he'd turn his weary soul,
And plunge his fingers in the salad bowl.

The poem was reproduced in the book Common Sense in The Household: A Manual of Practical Housewifery by Marion Harland, a pen name of Mary Virginia Hawes Terhune, which was to become the most successful American cookbook at the end of the 19th century, selling over 10 million copies.

== See also ==
- Metaphorical recipe
