= Scripture cake =

Fruit cake recipe

Recipe from Presbyterian Cookbook (1900) (Note: Translated: To four and one-half cups fine flour add one-half cup butter, two cups sugar, two cups raisins, two cups dried figs, one cup almonds, one-half cup milk, two teaspoonfuls leavener, two tablespoonfuls honey, season to taste spices, a pinch of salt, and six eggs. When properly prepared, you will find this a most delicious cake.)

A scripture cake is a fruit cake in which the recipe is formatted as a series of biblical references. A direction to add eggs, for instance, may read "add 6 Jeremiah 17:11", alluding to the opening lines "Like a partridge that hatches eggs it did not lay".

Besides its unconventional recipe format, scripture cake is a rather standard fruit cake, making the appeal often the recipe rather than the product—in its humor and the puzzle of uncovering the recipe's meaning. Among cooks sharing recipes, the need to consult the bible in making the cake is frequently seen as an asset, with recipes often stating that making the cake is a good way for children to learn scripture. Not all recipes required cooks to consult or know their bibles—some provide the answers in-line, which can indicate the authors prioritise making people feel included.

Scripture cake may have originated in Britain in 18th century. These recipes often feature in America in community cookbooks, sometimes under the names bible cake, scriptural cake, or Old Testament cake. From the late 19th through early 20th century, recipes for scripture cakes were ubiquitous in church community cookbooks across the country, appearing in more than half of the books produced in the period in the US. At church fairs during the period, slices of scripture cakes with their recipes were often sold to raise money. Scripture cakes continued to appear widely during the second half of the 20th century, particularly in the southern US. Scripture cakes are still made in the US in churches, both by children at Sunday school and adults in groups. They are prominent in the cookbooks of African-American authors. Outside of the US, recipes for scripture cake have appeared in cookbooks in Canada and the UK.

References to the Bible were not restricted to ingredient lists. After listing the required ingredients, many community cookbook instructed "Follow Solomon's advice for making good boys and you will have a good cake. Proverbs 23:14"; corresponding with "Punish them with the rod; save them from death"; some following this with advice to "do as Tamar did (2 Samuel 13:8)": "Tamar... made cakes in his sight, and did bake the cakes."

== Verses ==
Verse	Quote	Ref
Judges 5:25	...she brought forth butter in a lordly dish.	
Genesis 18:8	And he took butter, and milk, and the calf which he had dressed, and set it before them...	
Jeremiah 6:20	To what purpose cometh there to me incense from Sheba, and the sweet cane from a far country (sugar)	
1 Samuel 14:25	And all they of the land came to a wood; and there was honey upon the ground.	
Judges 14:18	"What is sweeter than honey?..."	
Jeremiah 17:11	As the partridge sitteth on eggs, and hatcheth them not; so he that getteth riches, and not by right, shall leave them in the midst of his days.	
Isaiah 10:14	And my hand hath found as a nest the riches of the people, and as one gathereth eggs that are left, have I gathered all the earth	
1 Samuel 25:18	...a hundred clusters of raisins...	
1 Samuel 30:12	And they gave him a piece of a cake of figs, and two clusters of raisins.	
Nahum 3:12	All thy strong holds shall be like fig trees with the first ripe figs: if they be shaken, they shall even fall into the mouth of the eater. (dried figs)	
Isaiah 34:4	all their host shall fall down, as the leaf falleth off from the vine, and as a falling fig from the fig tree.	
Exodus 15:27	And they came to Elim, where were twelve wells of water and threescore and ten palm trees (dates)	
Numbers 17:8	...and behold, the rod of Aaron...brought forth buds, and bloomed blossoms, and yielded almonds.	
1 Kings 4:22	And Solomon's provision for one day was thirty measures of fine flour.	
Leviticus 2:5	And if thy oblation be a meat offering baked in a pan, it shall be of fine flour, unleavened, mingled with oil.	
Amos 4:5	Burn leavened bread as a thank offering and brag about your freewill offerings (leavener/baking powder)	
2 Chronicles 9:9	neither was there any such spice as the queen of Sheba gave King Solomon.	
Exodus 30:23	Take thou also unto thee principal spices, of pure myrrh five hundred shekels, and of sweet cinnamon half so much...	
Song of Songs 4:10	How much better is thy love than wine, and the smell of thine ointments than all spices! (allspice)	
Leviticus 2:13	With all thine offerings thou shalt offer salt.	
Judges 4:19	And she opened a bottle of milk, and gave him milk, and covered him.	
Numbers 11:8	and the taste of it was as the taste of fresh oil.	
Genesis 24:20	And she hasted, and emptied her pitcher into the trough, and ran again unto the well to draw water, and drew for all his camels	

== See also ==
- Metaphorical recipe

== Sources ==
- Byrn, Anne (2016). American Cake: From Colonial Gingerbread to Classic Layer, the Stories and Recipes Behind More Than 125 of Our Best-Loved Cakes. New York: Rodale. ISBN 978-1-62336-543-1.
- David, Elizabeth (2018) [2003]. Norman, Jane (ed.). Elizabeth David's Christmas. London: Penguin Books. ISBN 978-0-7181-7850-5.
- Driver, Elizabeth (2008). Culinary Landmarks: A Bibliography of Canadian Cookbooks, 1825-1949. Toronto, Ontario & Buffalo: University of Toronto Press. ISBN 978-0-8020-4790-8.
- Dutch, Jennifer Rachel (Summer 2018). "Not Just for Laughs". Western Folklore. 77 (3/4): 249–276. JSTOR 26864126.
- Earle, Rebecca (August 2026). "How to Cook a Husband and Other Metaphorical Recipes". Gastronomica: The Journal of Food and Culture. 26 (3): 83–91. doi:10.1525/gfc.2026.26.3.83.
- Fieldhouse, Paul (2017). Food, Feasts, and Faith: An Encyclopedia of Food Culture in World Religions. Santa Barbara, California: ABC-CLIO. ISBN 978-1-4408-4614-4.
- Fisher, Carol; Fisher, John C (2008). Pot Roast, Politics, and Ants in the Pantry: Missouri's Cookbook Heritage. Columbia: University of Missouri Press. ISBN 978-0-8262-1791-2.
- Grigson, Jane (1984). The Observer Guide to British Cookery. London: Michael Joseph Ltd. ISBN 0-7181-2689-0.
- Hughes, Glyn (2017). The Lost Foods of England. Winster, Derbyshire: Lulu Press. ISBN 978-0-244-02963-0.
- Ireland, Lynne (1998). "The Compiled Cookbook as Foodways Autobiography". In Shortridge, Barbara Gimla; Shortridge, James R (eds.). The Taste of American Place: A Reader on Regional and Ethnic Foods. Lanham, Maryland: Rowman & Littlefield. ISBN 0-8476-8506-3.
- Linsenmeyer, Helen Walker (1976). Cooking Plain: A Treasury of Century-Old Family Recipes, with a Selection of Natural Foods and Wild Game Cookery, and with Sections on Preserving Foods and on Household Hints, from the Illinois Country. Carbondale: Southern Illinois University Press. ISBN 0-8093-0782-0.
- Tipton-Martin, Toni (2019). Jubilee: Recipes from Two Centuries of African-American Cooking. New York, London: Clarkson Potter. ISBN 978-1-5247-6173-8.
