= Metaphorical recipe =

A metaphorical recipe uses the structure of a recipe—title, ingredient, method, and positive outcome—in a humorous or otherwise non-literal manner to express a non-culinary idea.

Metaphorical recipes have been used extensively by advertisers in the form of parody, and also appear throughout community cookbooks of the early 20th century. The positive outcome figures prominently in many parody recipes published in cookbooks, attesting that a happy life, community or citizenry may be acquired through deploying virtues such as sympathy, optimism and selflessness. Most of the time, the subject is a woman. A recipe for a "happy life", published in Toronto during World War I in a cookbook in Aunt Hannah's War-Time and Peace-Time Recipes was typical:

Take a large quantity of Cheerfulness and let it simmer without stopping. Put with it a brimming basinful of Kindness, then add a full measure of Thought for Other People. Mix into these a piling tablespoonful of Sympathy. Flavor with essence of Charity. Stir well together, and then carefully strain off any grains of Selfishness. Let the whole be served with Love sauce, and Fruit of the Spirit.

Husbands are a theme in several metaphorical recipes, cookery being a common metaphor for marriage and sex. One, for "A Sweet Disposition", lists requirements such as "1 good liver", "3 grains of common sense", as well as "1 good husband". Recipes for "How to Cook a Husband" have appeared in cookbooks in the US and Canada since the late 19th century. One early example of the "How to Cook a Husband" genre comes in a pamphlet, circa 1880, warns "A good many husbands are utterly spoiled by mismanagement in cooking, and do not turn out tender or good". To create a happy marriage, then:

Lie him in the kettle with a strong silken cord called Comfort, as the one called duty is apt to be weak... Make a good steady fire out of love, neatness and cheerfulness ... Add a little sugar in the form confectioners called kisses & spice if used with judgement may be added. No sharp instrument must be stuck into him to see if he is tender... If thus treated, you will find him digestible, agree ing nicely with you as long as you do not grow careless and stick him in too cold a place.

== See also ==
- Rhyming recipe
- Scripture cake

== Sources ==
- Draper, Gary (2009). "Dishing Dad: "How to Cook a Husband" and Other Metaphorical Recipes". In Cooke, Nathalie (ed.). What's to Eat?: Entrées in Canadian Food History. Montreal, Quebec: McGill-Queen's University Press. ISBN 978-0-7735-3570-1.
- Driver, Elizabeth (2008). Culinary Landmarks: A Bibliography of Canadian Cookbooks, 1825-1949. Toronto, Ontario & Buffalo: University of Toronto Press. ISBN 978-0-8020-4790-8.
- Earle, Rebecca (August 2026). "How to Cook a Husband and Other Metaphorical Recipes". Gastronomica: The Journal of Food and Culture. 26 (3): 83–91. doi:10.1525/gfc.2026.26.3.83.
