= Nun's puffs =

Dessert pastry

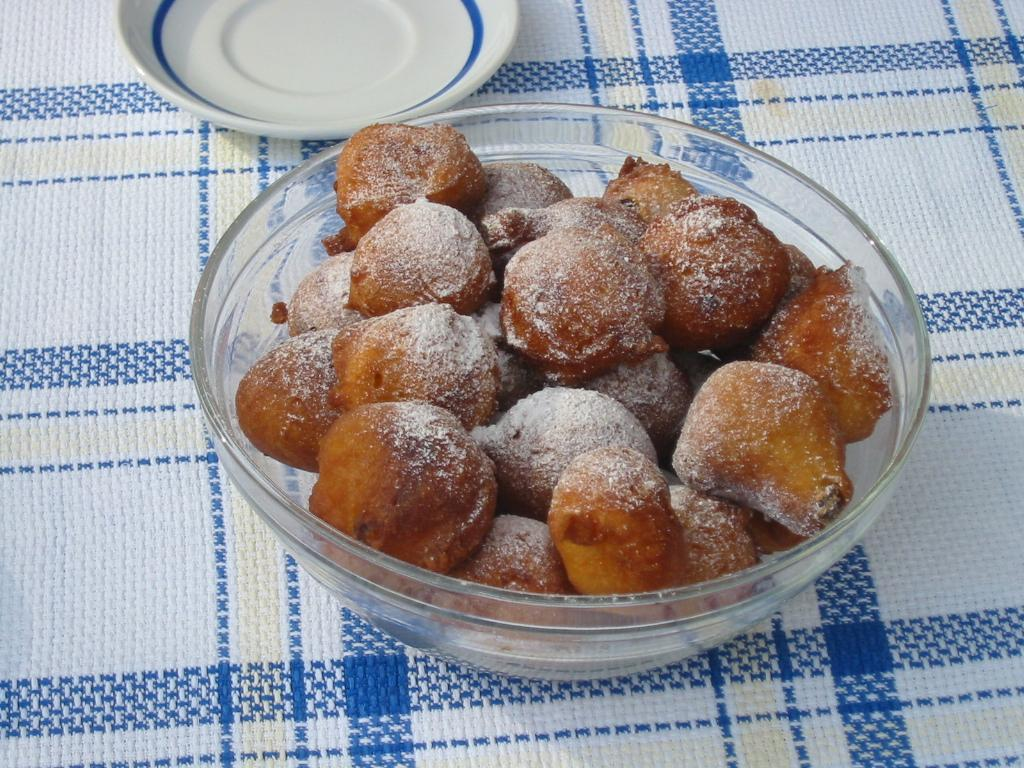
- "Nun's farts" or "nun's puffs" are a light, airy dessert pastry.
- Alternative names: Nun's farts
- Type: Pastry
- Course: Dessert
- Place of origin: France
- Serving temperature: Hot or room temperature
- Main ingredients: Butter, milk, flour, sugar, eggs; sometimes honey

Nun's puffs (also known less euphemistically as nun's farts) are a dessert pastry originally from France, where they were known as pets de nonne. They are now also produced in French Canada, the United States, England, Spain and México.

== Description ==
The recipe is included in an 1856 "cook book" and Oxford University's Household Encyclopedia from 1859. The dessert is made from butter, milk, flour, sugar, eggs, and sometimes honey. Recipes call for pan frying (traditionally in lard), re-frying and then baking, or baking straight away. The best-established recipes suggest cooking the butter, milk, and flour in a pan, then adding the eggs (whites last) and sprinkling sugar on the mixture before baking. Choux pastry is also cooked twice, to prepare the paste and to "transform it into puffs". It dates to medieval times and is a cross between a batter and a dough. A cream filling can also be inserted.

The dessert has been described as "light tender morsels" that are "heavenly". Another description describes them as a "cream puff batter that bakes like a popover". Recipes for nun's puffs are also included in two Virginia cookbooks.

== Etymology ==
The similarly named French-Canadian dessert pets de sœurs (literally "farts of [religious] sisters") is sometimes confused with this dessert, but is actually a completely different pastry.

The lightness of deep fried beignets is said to have inspired the French name pets de nonne (literally "nun's farts"). The French Wikipedia identifies an earlier term for the dessert, paix-de-nonne ("nun's peace"), which is pronounced the same as pets de nonne and likely is the origin of the later term. The origin of the English name "nun's puffs" is said to be a mystery.

A certain butter mixture is called "nun's butter", made with butter, sugar, wine, and nutmeg. Nun's farts are one of several foods that reference the church; others include nun's sighs, Religieuse (pastry), La religieuse (the cheese crust that forms at the bottom of a fondue pot), cappuccino, angel food cake, cardinal mousse, hermit's food, twelfth-night cake, scripture cake, Christmas cake, Quaker cake, Jerusalem pudding, Jésuite, and devil's food cake.

== See also ==
- Choux pastry
- Nun's Farts
- Puff pastry
- Profiterole
- List of choux pastry dishes
- List of pastries
