= Terence E. Fretheim =

Old Testament scholar

Terence E. Fretheim (January 27, 1936 – November 16, 2020) was an Old Testament scholar and the Elva B. Lovell professor of Old Testament at Luther Seminary. His writings have played a major part in the development of process theology and open theism.

== Biographical Information ==
Terence Fretheim was first connected with the Luther Seminary faculty as a teaching fellow in Greek in 1958-60 while he was still a seminary student. He returned as assistant professor in 1968 and became professor of Old Testament in 1978. He was dean of academic affairs (1978–88) and also served as acting chair of the Old Testament department (1977–78) and chair of the curriculum committee (1976–77).

He was an instructor in Old Testament at Augsburg College and Seminary, Minneapolis, in 1961–63, and assistant professor of religion at Augsburg College in 1967–68. Ordained in 1968, Fretheim was pastor of Dennison (Minn.) Lutheran Church in 1968–71. He has been visiting professor at McCormick Theological Seminary in Chicago, and both visiting professor and lecturer at the University of Chicago Divinity School.

Fretheim received the Fulbright Scholarship for study in England, the Lutheran Brotherhood Seminary Graduate Scholarship, the Martin Luther Scholarship, the Fredrik A. Schiotz Fellowship Award, and the ATS Scholarship for Theological Research.

A graduate of Luther College (Iowa) (B.A., 1956), Fretheim earned the M.Div. degree from Luther Seminary in 1960 and the Th.D. degree from Princeton Seminary in 1967. He has also studied at the University of Durham, England, the University of Minnesota, the University of Heidelberg in Germany, Oxford University in England, and the University of Chicago. As a Luther College alumnus, he was elected to Phi Beta Kappa in 1995.

He was a member of the Catholic Biblical Association and the Society of Biblical Literature and was Editor of SBL Old Testament Monographs. He served on the Buddhist and Muslim Task Forces of the American Lutheran Church, was co-chair of the Theological Consultation for the Evangelical Lutheran Church in America, has been president of the Minnesota Consortium of Theological Schools, and Old Testament Book Editor for the Journal of Biblical Literature.

Terence Fretheim died on November 16, 2020.

== Works Published ==
Fretheim published numerous books, including: The Pentateuch (Abingdon, 1996); Proclamation 6 (Fortress, 1997); The Bible as Word of God in a Postmodern Era (Fortress, 1998; with K. Froehlich); First and Second Kings (Westminster, 1999); About the Bible: Short Answers to Big Questions (Augsburg, 1999); In God's Image: A Study of Genesis (Augsburg, 1999); A Theological Introduction to the Old Testament (Abingdon, 1999), with B. Birch, W. Brueggemann, and D. Petersen; and Jeremiah: A Commentary (Smyth & Helwys, 2002). God and World in the Old Testament: A Relational Theology of Creation (Abingdon, 2005); Hope in God in Times of Suffering (with Faith Fretheim) (Augsburg/Fortress, 2006); Abraham: Trials of Family and Faith (University of South Carolina Press, 2007).

His 1984 book, The Suffering of God: An Old Testament Perspective is an exegetical approach to many of the themes and issues associated with process theology and open theism.
