= Recipe =

Instructions for preparing food

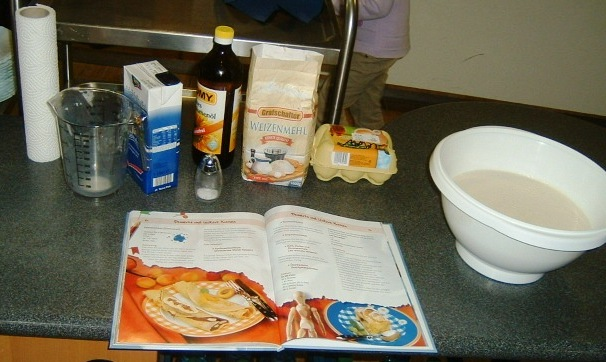
A recipe in a cookbook for pancakes with the prepared ingredients

A recipe is a set of instructions that lists the ingredients and steps needed to prepare a specific dish or meal. A sub-recipe or subrecipe is a recipe for an ingredient that will be called for in the instructions for the main recipe. Recipe books (also called cookbooks or cookery books) are collections of recipes that reflect cultural identities and social changes, while also serving as educational tools. Historically, the definition of a recipe also encompassed medical remedies, as the production of food and medicine was linked in most households.

== History ==
=== Early examples ===
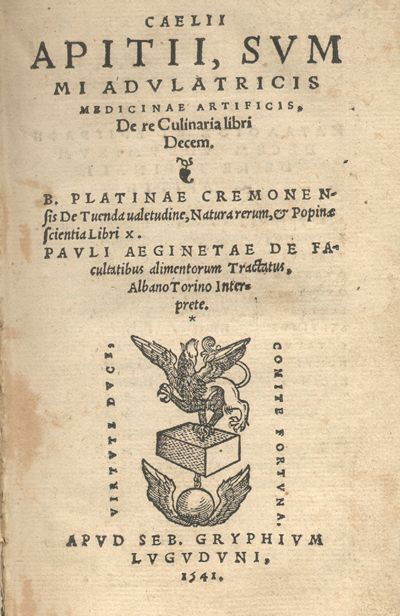
Apicius, De re culinaria, an early collection of recipes

The earliest known written recipes date to 1730 BC and were recorded on cuneiform tablets found in Mesopotamia.

Other early written recipes date from approximately 1600 BC and come from an Akkadian tablet from southern Babylonia. There are also works in ancient Egyptian hieroglyphs depicting the preparation of food.

Many ancient Greek recipes are known. Mithaecus's cookbook was an early one, but most of it has been lost; Athenaeus quotes one short recipe in his Deipnosophistae. Athenaeus mentions many other cookbooks, all of them lost.

Roman recipes are known dating in the 2nd century BCE with Cato the Elder's De Agri Cultura. Many authors of this period described eastern Mediterranean cooking in Greek and in Latin. Some Punic recipes are known in Greek and Latin translation.

The large collection of recipes De re coquinaria, conventionally titled Apicius, appeared in the 4th or 5th century and is the only complete surviving cookbook from the classical world. It lists the courses served in a meal as Gustatio (appetizer), Primae Mensae (main course) and Secundae Mensae (dessert). Each recipe begins with the Latin command "Take...," "Recipe...."

Arabic recipes are documented starting in the 10th century; see al-Warraq and al-Baghdadi.

The earliest recipe in Persian dates from the 14th century. Several recipes have survived from the time of Safavids, including Karnameh (1521) by Mohammad Ali Bavarchi, which includes the cooking instruction of more than 130 different dishes and pastries, and Madat-ol-Hayat (1597) by Nurollah Ashpaz. Recipe books from the Qajar era are numerous, the most notable being Khorak-ha-ye Irani by prince Nader Mirza.

King Richard II of England commissioned a recipe book called Forme of Cury in 1390, and around the same time, another book was published entitled Curye on Inglish, "cury" meaning cooking. Both books give an impression of how food for the noble classes was prepared and served in England at that time. The luxurious taste of the aristocracy in the Early Modern Period brought with it the start of what can be called the modern recipe book. By the 15th century, numerous manuscripts were appearing detailing the recipes of the day. Many of these manuscripts give very good information and record the re-discovery of many herbs and spices including coriander, parsley, basil and rosemary, many of which had been brought back from the Crusades.

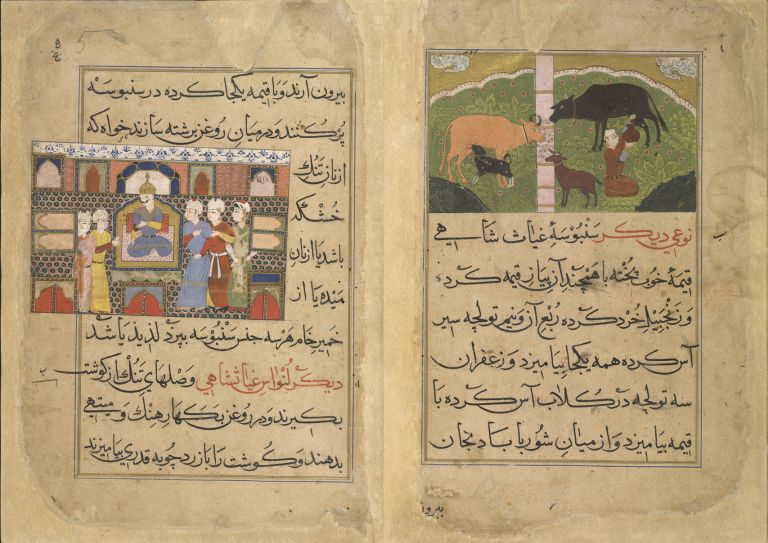
A page from the Nimatnama-i-Nasiruddin-Shahi, book of delicacies and recipes. It documents the fine art of making kheer.

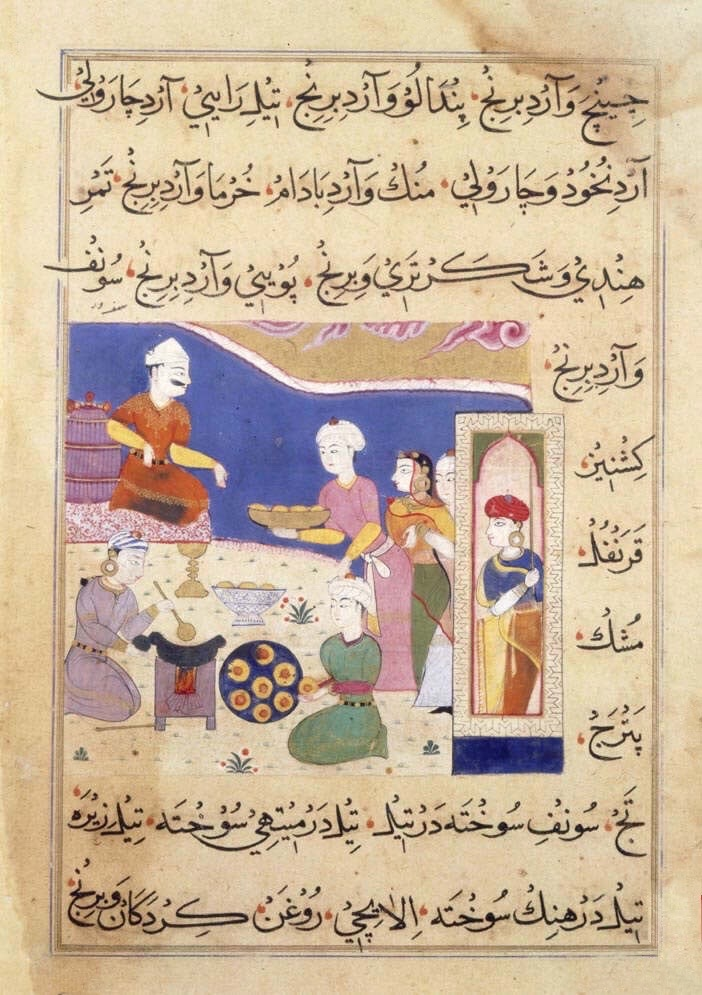
Medieval Indian Manuscript (c. 16th century) showing samosas being served

=== Medieval and early modern medical recipes ===
In older English works, a recipe was called a "receipt". Both words "receipt" and "recipe" were originally used to mean instructions on how to administer medicine. Medical recipes were an important part of literature in medieval Europe, as they were the primary means for sharing medical knowledge. Key medieval examples include Bald's Leechbook and the Tabula Medicine which both functioned as encyclopedias of medical information. These recipe books were often organized alphabetically by ailment or followed an a capite ad calcem ("from head to foot") structure, that listed cured for each part of the body. A defining linguistic feature of these medical recipes was the use of efficacy phrases like probatum est ("it is proved"). This language was meant to signal to the reader that a remedy had been personally tested and verified, establishing a sense of medical authority.

There were different types of "paper tools" that were used to aid in the process writing down medical texted. Vade Mecums were small, portable handbooks that were used to jot down quick instructions when first encountered during travel or a social visit. Intermediary books were volumes that organized recipes and held them in a liminal stage while they waited to be tested. Lastly, neat or gift books were volumes that were carefully put together to record treasured knowledge that had been personal verified and was intended to pass down to children as a family heirloom.

Many examples of handwritten medical recipe books come from common people's personal collections. Lady Johanna St. John recorded her final wishes in her will before her death in 1704, which included two handwritten recipe books among her other treasured items. The first was a volume of recipes for cookery while the second was her "Great Receit Book" which was filled with hundreds of remedies for various illnesses organized in alphabetical order. Recipe books were treated as treasured heirlooms and vital "paperwork of kinship." They were essential records of a family's history and social status.

==== Connection between culinary and medical recipes ====
In medieval and early modern periods, medical and culinary recipes were fundamentally connected through their material format, shared domestic origins, and underlying scientific theory. During this era, the majority of healthcare was home-based, so most medicines and remedies were produced within the same household kitchens and stillrooms used for food preparation. This resulted in tools such as pots, skillets, mortars and pestles, and jelly bags for straining to be used both for cooking meals and compounding medical remedies. Even more specialized equipment, such as alembics (limbecks) and cold stills, that were common in upper class estate kitchens were used for both medical and culinary purposes.

The integration was rooted in the Galenic framework of humoral physiology, which did not conceptually separate food and drugs. According to this system of medicine, health was maintained by balancing the body's humors, through diet, making culinary preparation a primary component of the "care of the body." For example, a roasted leg of mutton may be a delicious meal, while simultaneously being recommended as an "excellent sovereign" for digestive issues. This conceptual overlap is seen most clearly in the physical structure of family books, which often put medical and culinary instructions together in a single volume. This further explains the practice of using the same kitchen equipment to produce both the family's daily nourishment and essential remedies.

=== Modern recipes and cooking advice ===
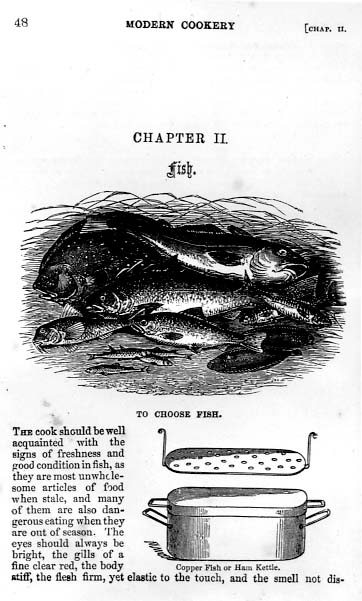
from Modern Cookery for Private Families by Eliza Acton (London: Longmans, Green, Reader, and Dyer, 1871. p.48.)

With the advent of the printing press in the 16th and 17th centuries, numerous books were written on managing households and preparing food. In Holland and England competition grew between the noble families as to who could prepare the most lavish banquet. By the 1660s, cookery had progressed to an art form, and good cooks were in demand. Many of them published their own books, detailing their recipes in competition with their rivals. Many of these books have been translated and are available online.

By the 19th century, the Victorian preoccupation for domestic respectability brought about the emergence of cookery writing in its modern form. Although eclipsed in fame and regard by Isabella Beeton, the first modern cookery writer and compiler of recipes for the home was Eliza Acton. Her pioneering cookbook, Modern Cookery for Private Families published in 1845, was aimed at the domestic reader rather than the professional cook or chef. This was immensely influential, establishing the format for modern writing about cookery. It introduced the now-universal practice of listing the ingredients and suggested cooking times with each recipe. It included the first recipe for Brussels sprouts. Contemporary chef Delia Smith called Acton "the best writer of recipes in the English language." Modern Cookery long survived Acton, remaining in print until 1914 and available more recently in facsimile.

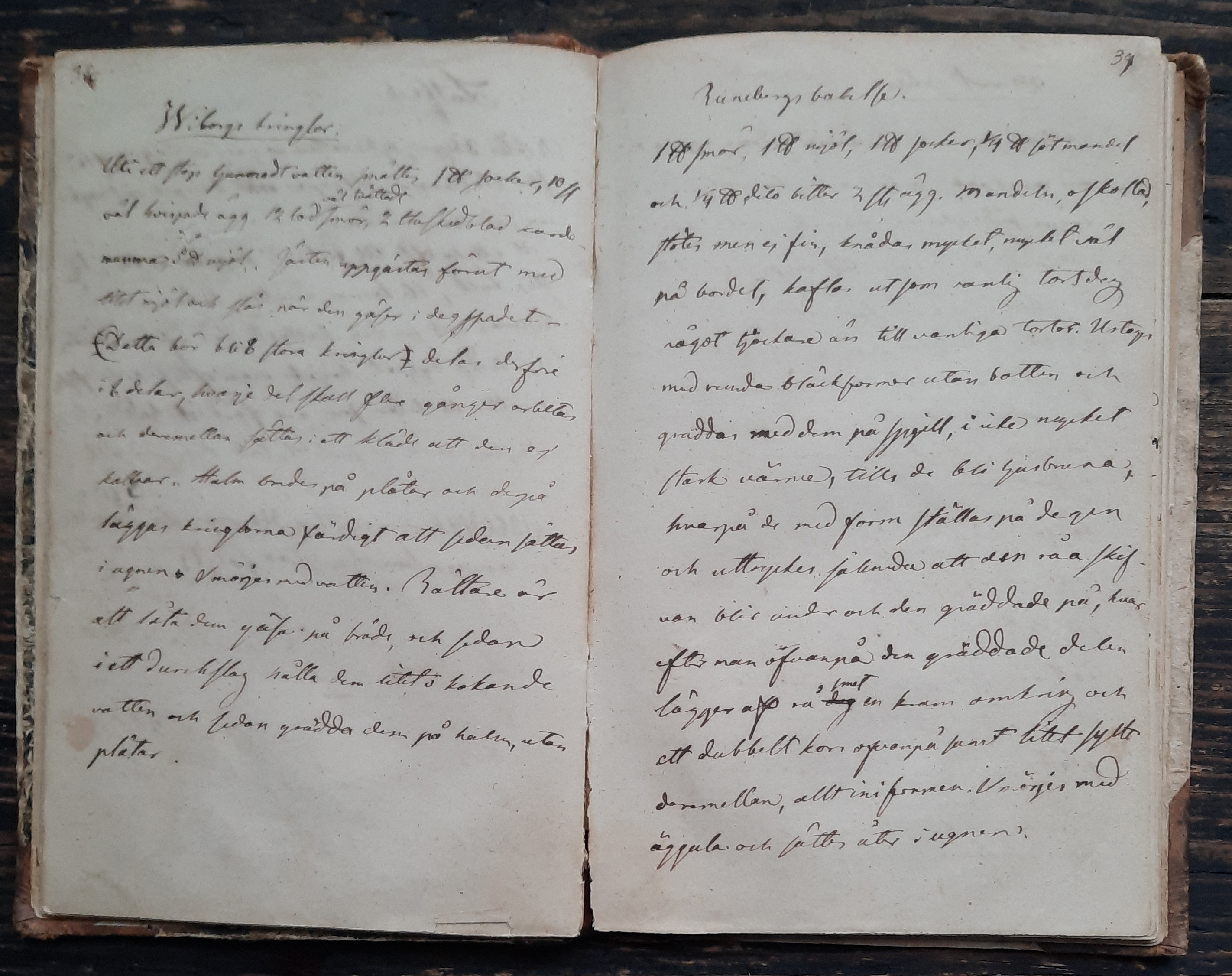
Fredrika Runeberg's original recipe from 1850s for "Runebergsbakelse"

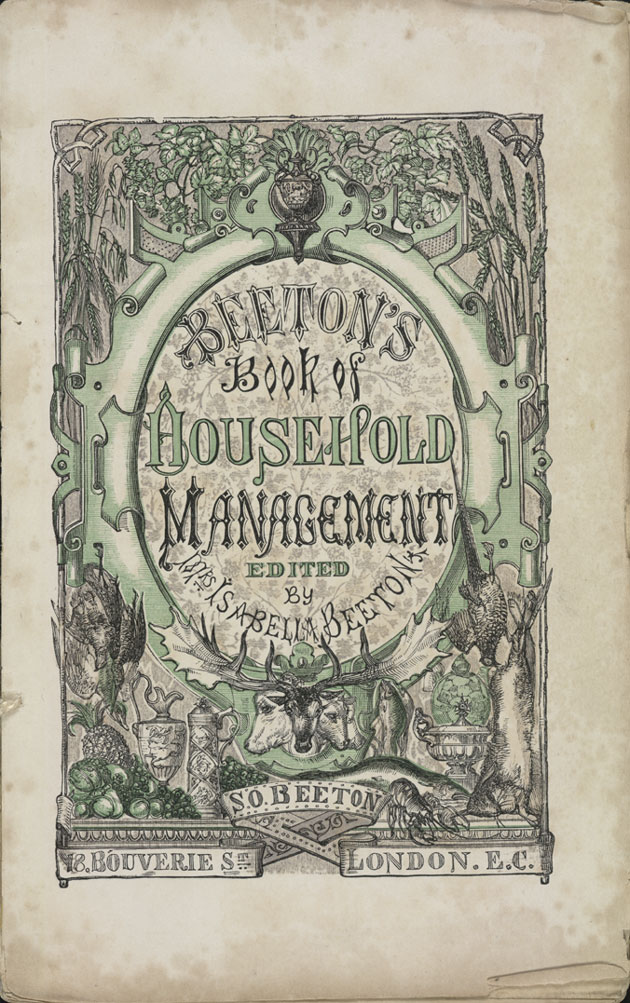
Titlepage of Beeton's Book of Household Management

Acton's work was an important influence on Isabella Beeton, who published Mrs Beeton's Book of Household Management in 24 monthly parts between 1857 and 1861. This was a guide to running a Victorian household, with advice on fashion, child care, animal husbandry, poisons, the management of servants, science, religion, and industrialism. Of the 1,112 pages, over 900 contained recipes. Most were illustrated with coloured engravings. It is said that many of the recipes were plagiarised from earlier writers such as Acton, but the Beetons never claimed that the book's contents were original. It was intended as a reliable guide for the aspirant middle classes.

The American cook Fannie Farmer (1857–1915) published in 1896 her famous work The Boston Cooking School Cookbook which contained some 1,849 recipes.

== Components ==
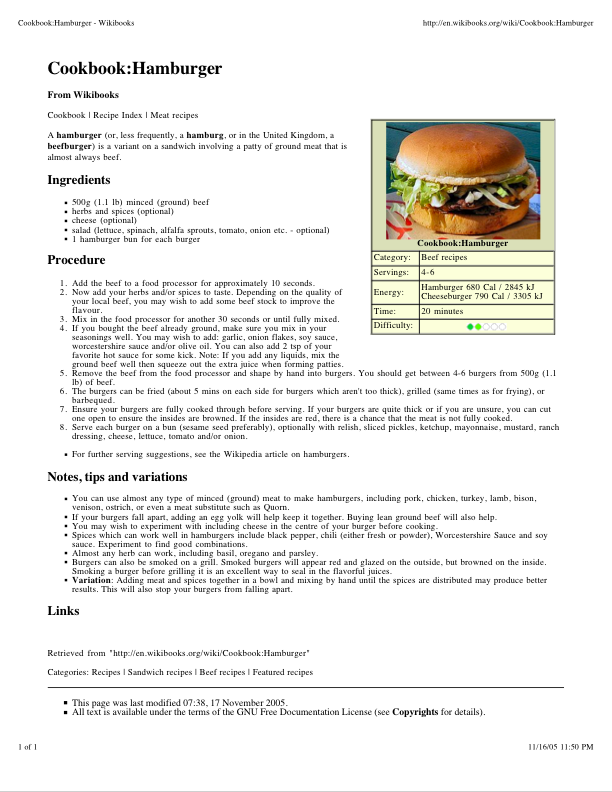
An example recipe, printed from the Wikibooks Cookbook

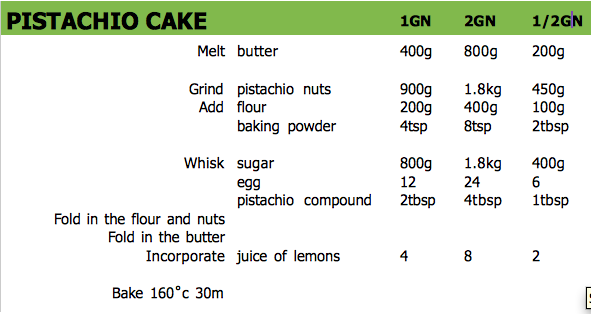
Recipe with ingredients integrated into the method

Formatting a recipe can be done in many different ways but two formats are typical. One typical format displays information in two columns, one for instructions and one for ingredients. The other typical format displays information in a solid block paragraph alternating between the ingredients and instructions.

Modern culinary recipes normally consist of several components

- The name of the recipe (Origins/History of the dish).
- Yield: The number of servings that the dish provides.
- List all ingredients in the order of its use. Describe it in step by step instructions.
- List ingredients by quantity (Can abbreviate measurements: oz instead of ounces; tbsp instead of tablespoon)
- How much time does it take to prepare the dish, plus cooking time for the dish.
- Necessary equipment used for the dish.
- Cooking procedures. Temperature and bake time if necessary.
- Serving procedures (Served while warm/cold).
- Review of the dish (Would you recommend this dish to a friend?).
- Photograph of the dish (Optional).
- Nutritional Value: Helps for dietary restrictions. Includes number of calories or grams per serving.

Recipe writers sometimes also list variations of a traditional dish, to give different tastes of the same recipes.

Recipe writers may include a narrative before or after the recipe to add to the significance of the recipe. These consist of cultural values or personal stories relating to the dish.

=== Sub-recipes ===
A sub-recipe or subrecipe is a recipe for an ingredient that will be called for in the instructions for the main recipe.

Sub-recipes are often for spice blends, sauces, confits, pickles, preserves, jams, chutneys, or condiments. Sometimes the sub-recipe calls for the ingredient to be held for several hours, overnight, or longer, which home cooks sometimes find frustrating as it means the main recipe cannot be made in a single session or day. Sub-recipes discovered late and calling for an ingredient the cook does not have on hand means a special shopping trip or trying to find a substitute.

Sub-recipes, and the cookbooks that contain them, are often described as not being targeted at casual cooks. Reviewers have mentioned finding alternate uses for leftover sub-recipes.

Cookbooks including subrecipes include Christina Tosi's Momofuku Milk Bar (2011) and Terry Bryant's Vegetable Kingdom (2020).

== Internet and television recipes ==
By the mid-20th century, there were thousands of cookery and recipe books available. The next revolution came with the introduction of the TV cooks. The first TV cook in the world was Philip Harben with a show on the BBC called Cookery which premiered in June 1946. A few months later I Love to Eat presented by James Beard became the first such program in the US. TV cookery programs brought recipes to a new audience. In the early days, recipes were available by post from the BBC; later with the introduction of CEEFAX text on screen, they became available on television.

The first Internet Usenet newsgroup dedicated to cooking was net.cooks created in 1982, later becoming rec.food.cooking. It served as a forum to share recipes text files and cooking techniques.

In the U.S. in 2008, there was a renewed focus on cooking at home due to the late-2000s recession. Home cooking in the U.S. was similarly inspired in the early 2020s during the coronavirus pandemic.

The abundance of multimedia in modern food recipes allows recipes to be more accessible to home amateur chefs. The accessibility of cookbooks online further helps home cooks improve their skills and understand the cultural identities cookbooks have.

Television networks such as the Food Network and magazines are still a major source of recipe information, with international cooks and chefs such as Jamie Oliver, Gordon Ramsay, Nigella Lawson and Rachael Ray having prime-time shows and backing them up with Internet websites giving the details of all their recipes. These were joined by reality TV shows such as Top Chef or Iron Chef, and many Internet sites offering free recipes, but cookery books remain as popular as ever.

== Copyright ==
Under U.S. copyright law, recipes are in the public domain. However, a collection of recipes, as in a cookbook, is able to be copyrighted. Additionally, information accompanying the recipe, such as photographs of the food or a headnote describing its cultural context, can be copyrighted.

== See also ==
- Culinary art
- hRecipe - a microformat for marking-up recipes in web pages
- List of foods
- Metaphorical recipe
- Rhyming recipe
