= List of Lutheran clergy =

This is a listing of the major offices within the Lutheran churches, as well as significant individual Lutheran clergy.

This Lutheran pastor is confirming the youth of his congregation after instructing them in Luther's Small Catechism.

== Lists of Lutheran bishops and archbishops ==
- Presidents of the Lutheran World Federation
- Leading persons and bishops, Evangelical Lutheran Church in Bavaria
- Presidents, Evangelical Lutheran Synod (ELS)
- List of Ephoruses in Batak Christian Protestant Church
- Land provosts and state bishop, Evangelical Lutheran State Church of Eutin (1921–1976)
- List of Lutheran bishops of Hamar
- Bishops of Hamburg, North Elbian Evangelical Lutheran Church (1977–2008)
- Bishops of Hamburg-Lübeck, North Elbian Evangelical Lutheran Church (seat: Hamburg, 2008– to date)
- State bishops, Evangelical-Lutheran State Church of Hanover
- Bishops of Helsinki
- Lutheran bishops of Hólar
- Bishops of Holstein-Lübeck, North Elbian Evangelical Lutheran Church (seat: Lübeck, 1977–2008)
- Bishops of Iceland
- List of bishops of Lund (Earlier names on the list are Catholic)
- Presidents & Bishops, Lutheran Church in Malaysia and Singapore
- Leading persons and bishops, Evangelical Lutheran Church in Oldenburg
- Bishops of Schleswig, Evangelical Lutheran State Church of Schleswig-Holstein (1925–1976), North Elbian Evangelical Lutheran Church (1977–2008)
- Bishops of Schleswig and Holstein, North Elbian Evangelical Lutheran Church (seat: Schleswig, 2008– to date)
- Bishops, Independent Evangelical Lutheran Church (SELK)
- Lutheran bishops of Skálholt
- Lutheran Bishops of Turku and Archbishops of Turku and Finland
- Lutheran Archbishops of Uppsala
- Presidents, Wisconsin Evangelical Lutheran Synod
- Leading persons and state bishops, Evangelical State Church in Württemberg

== Additional Lutheran leaders ==
- Johan Arnd Aasgaard (1876-1966) - President of the Evangelical Lutheran Church
- Erland Carlsson (1822-1893) - One of the founders and President of the Augustana Synod
- Gottlieb Bender Christiansen (1851-1929) - Founding President of the United Danish Evangelical Lutheran Church
- Claus Lauritz Clausen (1820-1892) - President of the Conference of the Norwegian-Danish Evangelical Lutheran Church of America
- Elling Eielsen (1804-1883) - Founder of The Eielsen Synod (Evangelical Lutheran Church in America)
- Lars Paul Esbjörn (1808-1870) - One of the founders of the Augustana Synod and Augustana College
- Johann Fischer (1636-1705) - German theologian and Superintendent of Livonia
- Tuve Hasselquist (1816-1891) - Founding President of the Augustana Synod
- Ulrik Vilhelm Koren (1826-1910) - President of the Synod of the Norwegian Evangelical Lutheran Church in America
- Christoph Kähler - Presiding bishop of the Protestant Lutheran Church in Thuringia.
- Margot Käßmann (b. 1958) - Bishop for the Protestant Lutheran Church of Hanover.
- Jaan Kiivit, Jr (1940-2005) Former archbishop of the Evangelical Lutheran Church of Estonia.
- Johan Kõpp (1874-1970)- Estonian Lutheran bishop who fled to Sweden after the Soviet takeover.et:Johan Kõpp
- Frederick Muhlenberg (1750 - 1801) - Clergy, first Speaker of US House
- Heinrich Melchior Muhlenberg (1711 - 1786) - Founder of the Lutheran church in America.
- Peter Muhlenberg (1746 - 1807) - Clergy, Revolutionary War soldier, US House, US Senate
- Ishmael Noko (b. 1943)- General secretary of the Lutheran World Federation.
- Eric Norelius (1833-1916)- One of the founders and President of the Augustana Synod
- Kuno Pajula (1924-2012) - Former archbishop of the Evangelical Lutheran Church of Estonia.
- Andres Põder (b. 1949) - The current archbishop of the Evangelical Lutheran Church of Estonia.
- Hans Gerhard Stub (1849-1931) - First bishop of the Evangelical Lutheran Church (United States)
- Jonas Swensson (1828-1873) - Former president of the Augustana Evangelical Lutheran Church.

== List of clergy ==
=== Academics ===
- Thomas R. Ahlersmeyer (b. 1954) - President of Concordia University, Ann Arbor, Michigan
- Kristian Anker (1848-1928) - President of the combined Trinity Seminary and Dana College
- Anton Marius Andersen (1847-1941) - Founding President of Trinity Seminary at Dana College
- Georg M. Grossmann (1823-1897) - Founder of Wartburg College
- Theodore Marcus Hansen (1886-1973) - President of Dana College and Trinity Seminary
- John N. Kildahl (1857-1920) - Lutheran church minister, author and educator, President of St. Olaf College
- O. P. Kretzmann (1901-1975) - President of Valparaiso University, Lutheran pastor, author, and professor
- Peter Laurentius Larsen - Founding president of Luther College.
- Knud Ejler Løgstrup (1905-1981) - Danish philosopher and theologian. Pastor at Sandager- Holevad from 1936–1943. Professor at University of Aarhus from 1943-1975
- Thorbjorn N. Mohn (1844-1899) - Founding president of St. Olaf College
- Bernt Julius Muus (1832-1900) - Founder of St. Olaf College
- Robert Preus (1924-1995) - Lutheran pastor, professor, author, and seminary president
- Stephan Ludwig Roth (1796-1849) - Transylvanian educationist.
- Jacob Tanner (1865-1964) - Norwegian American Lutheran educator and religious author
- John Tietjen (1928-2004) - Noted for the Seminex controversy.
- Peter Sørensen Vig (1854-1929) - President of Trinity Seminary and the president of Dana College

=== Activists ===
- K. G. William Dahl (1883-1917) - Lutheran minister, author and social advocate. Founder of Bethphage Mission.
- Robert Graetz (1928-2020) - Possibly the only white member of the Montgomery Improvement Association.
- Sumowood Harris - Liberian peace activist.
- Bernt B. Haugan (1862-1931) - American minister, politician, and temperance leader.
- Richard Wurmbrand (1909–2001) - Lutheran priest imprisoned by Communist authorities and later founded Voice of the Martyrs to advocate for persecuted Christians
- Judith Hird (b. 1946) - first woman to become a Lutheran pastor.
- William A. Passavant (1821-1894) - Lutheran minister noted for bringing the Lutheran Deaconess movement to the United States.
- Roland Weisselberg (1933-2006) - Critic of the former East Germany who later committed Self-immolation as a protest against the spread of Islam.

=== Explorers and colonizers ===
- Gotthard Fritzsche (1797-1863) - A founding figure for Australia's Lutherans.
- Rasmus Jensen (d. 1620) - One of the earliest Lutheran chaplains to go the "New World."
- August Kavel (1798-1860) - A founding figure for Australia's Lutherans.
- Martin Stephan (1777-1846)- Settled with a colony of Saxons, later excommunicated.
- Reorus Torkillus (1608-1643)- First Lutheran clergyman to settle in New Sweden

=== Missionaries ===
- Johan Campanius (1601-1683) - Assigned to New Sweden, Missionary to the Lenape.
- Hans Egede (1686-1758) - "Apostle of Greenland."
- Onesimos Nesib (c.1856-1931)- Convert from Ethiopia who translated the Bible into Oromo and did missionary work in Africa.
- Bartholomäus Ziegenbalg (1683-1719) - Possibly the first Protestant missionary in India.
- Martti Rautanen (1845-1926) - First Christian missionary in Ovamboland in Namibia.
- Ludwig Ingwer Nommensen (1834–1918) was a Danish Lutheran missionary to Batak lands, North Sumatra, Indonesia, who also translated the New Testament into the native Batak language and was the first Ephorus (bishop) of Batak Christian Protestant Church

=== Monastics ===
- Arthur Kreinheder (1905-1989), Benedictine-Lutheran monk who founded The Congregation of the Servants of Christ at Saint Augustine's House
- Marianne Nordström (1925-2023), Evangelical-Lutheran nun of the Church of Sweden who was a founder of the Sisters of the Holy Spirit at Alsike Convent

=== Politicians ===
- Joh Bjelke-Petersen (1911-2005)- Former Premier of Queensland.
- Kjell Magne Bondevik (b. 1947) - Former Prime Minister of Norway.
- Francis Hoffmann (1822-1903) - Once Lieutenant Governor of Illinois and also wrote under a pen-name.
- John Herman Koch (1864-1929) - Former Wisconsin State Assemblyman.
- Antti Johannes Rantamaa (1904-1987) - Finnish chaplain who served in the Parliament of Finland.
- Parlindungan Wilfritz Togar Simanjuntak (1935-2021) - Former Indonesian Lutheran Minister. He was a member of the People's Representative Council from 1967 until 1971 and the Ephorus (chairman) of the Batak Christian Protestant Church (HKBP) (1993-1998).
- Willem Tumpal Pandapotan Simarmata (1954-2022) - Former Indonesian Lutheran Minister and Politician. He served in the Regional Representative Council from 2019 to 2022 representing North Sumatra.

=== Theologians ===
- Dietrich Bonhoeffer (1906-1945) - A founding member of the Confessing Church who was executed by Nazi Germany.
- Otto von Gerlach (1801-1849) - Nineteenth-century German.
- N. F. S. Grundtvig (1783-1872) - Danish pastor, author, poet and author of hymns
- Oswald Hoffmann (1913-2005) - Clergyman and speaker on The Lutheran Hour.
- Ernst Käsemann (1906-1998) - New Testament studies, also active against Nazism.
- Johann Konrad Wilhelm Löhe (1808-1872) - Celebrated by ELCA and LCMS.
- Martin Luther (1483-1546) - German professor of theology, composer, priest, monk, with whose teachings Lutheranism is associated.
- Martin Niemöller (1892-1984) - Former U-boat captain who became a theologian and, after initial enthusiasm, turned against Nazism.
- Jacob Aall Ottesen - Norwegian American minister, theologian and church leader
- Gunnar Rosendal (1897-1988) - Swedish theologian of High Church Lutheranism.

=== Writers ===
- Caspar Aquila (1488-1560) - Tract writer.
- Johann Ernst Glück (1652-1705) - Translated the Bible into Latvian.
- Paul Henkel (1754-1825) - Tract writer.
- Ludwig Gotthard Kosegarten (1858-1818) - German poet.
- Eduard Mörike (1804-1875) - German Romantic poet.
- Olaf M. Norlie (1876-1962) - Lutheran minister, educator scholar and author
- Kristian Ostergaard (1855-1931) - Danish-American Lutheran pastor, educator and author
- Nancy Raabe (1954-) - Pastor, author, composer. President, Association of Lutheran Church Musicians.
- Johann Adolf Schlegel (1721-1793) - Poet who wrote "Spiritual Songs" and fathered two poets.

== See also ==
- List of Lutheran dioceses and archdioceses
- Category:Evangelical Lutheran Church in America bishops
- Category:Presidents of the Lutheran Church–Missouri Synod
- Category:Primates of the Church of Norway
