= Norwegian-American Lutheranism =

Lutheran church tradition

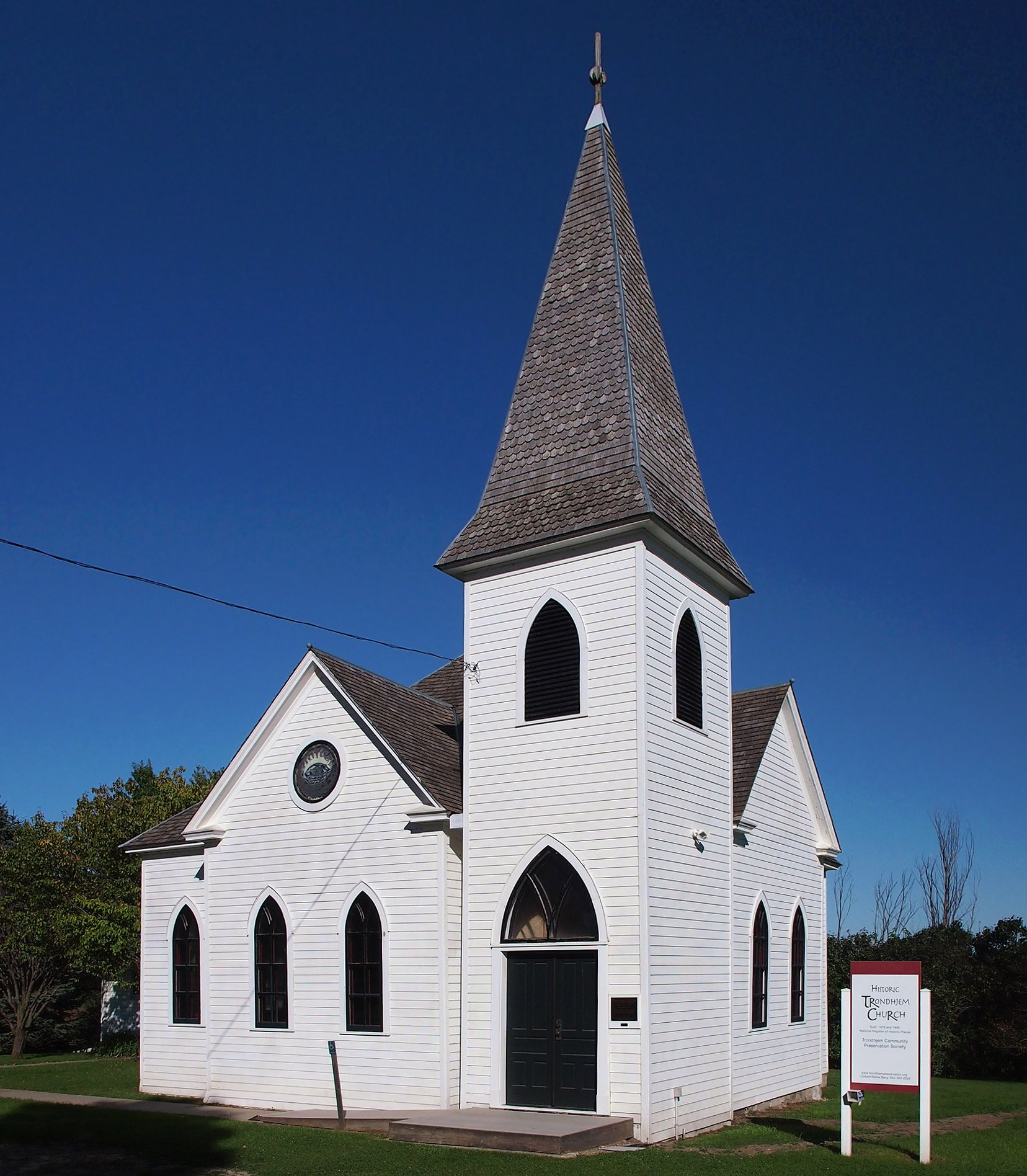
Trondhjem Norwegian Lutheran Church Webster Township, Rice County, Minnesota National Register of Historic Places

The Norwegian Lutheran Church in the United States is a general term to describe the Lutheran church tradition developed within the United States by immigrants from Norway.

== Background ==
Most Norwegian immigrants to the United States, particularly in the migration wave between the 1860s and early 20th century, were members of the Church of Norway, an evangelical Lutheran church established by the Constitution of Norway. As they settled in their new homeland and forged their own communities, however, Norwegian-American Lutherans diverged from the state church in many ways, forming synods and conferences that ultimately contributed to the present Lutheran establishment in the United States.

== Early foundations ==
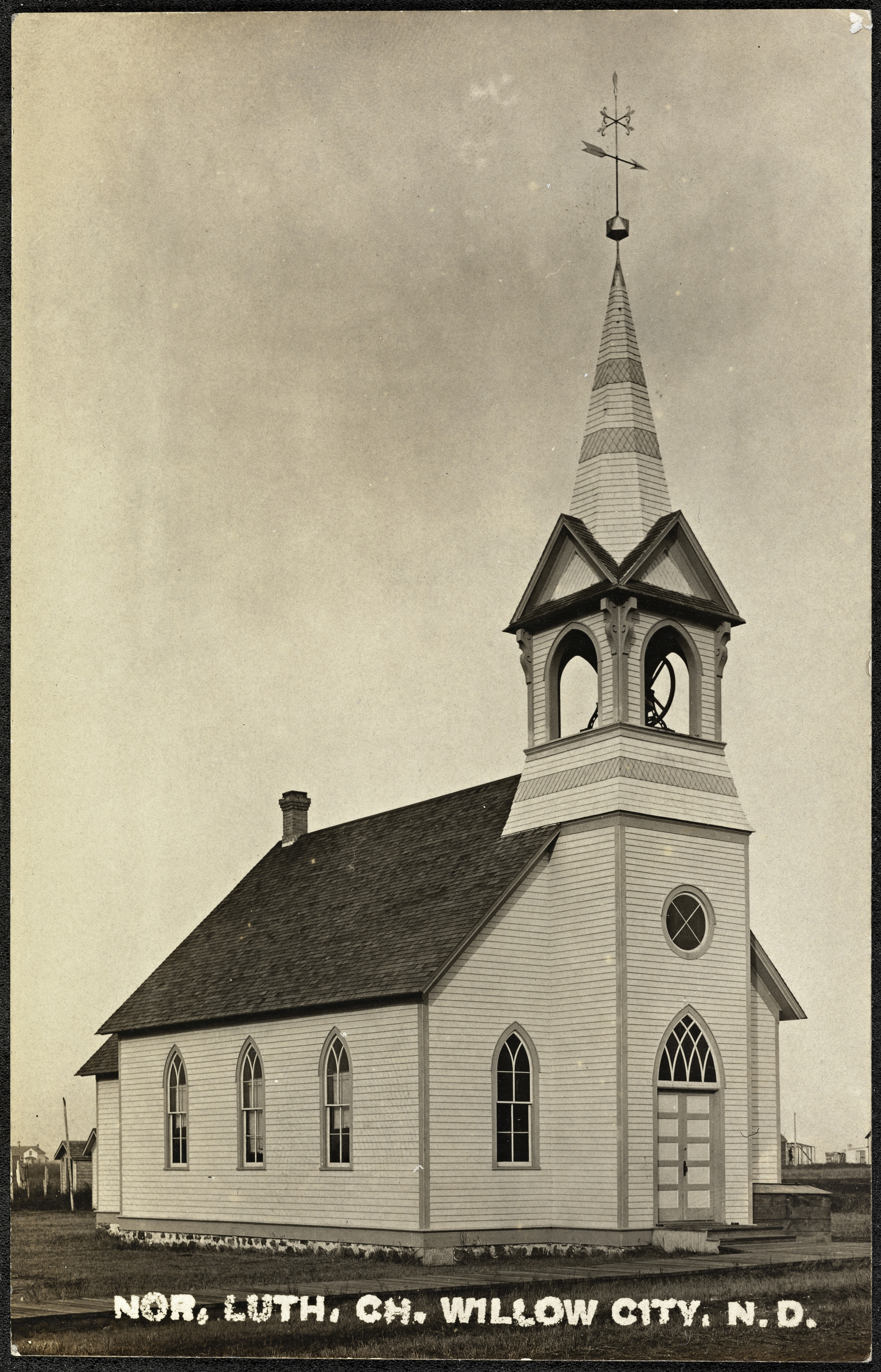
Norwegian Lutheran Church in Willow City, North Dakota, undated

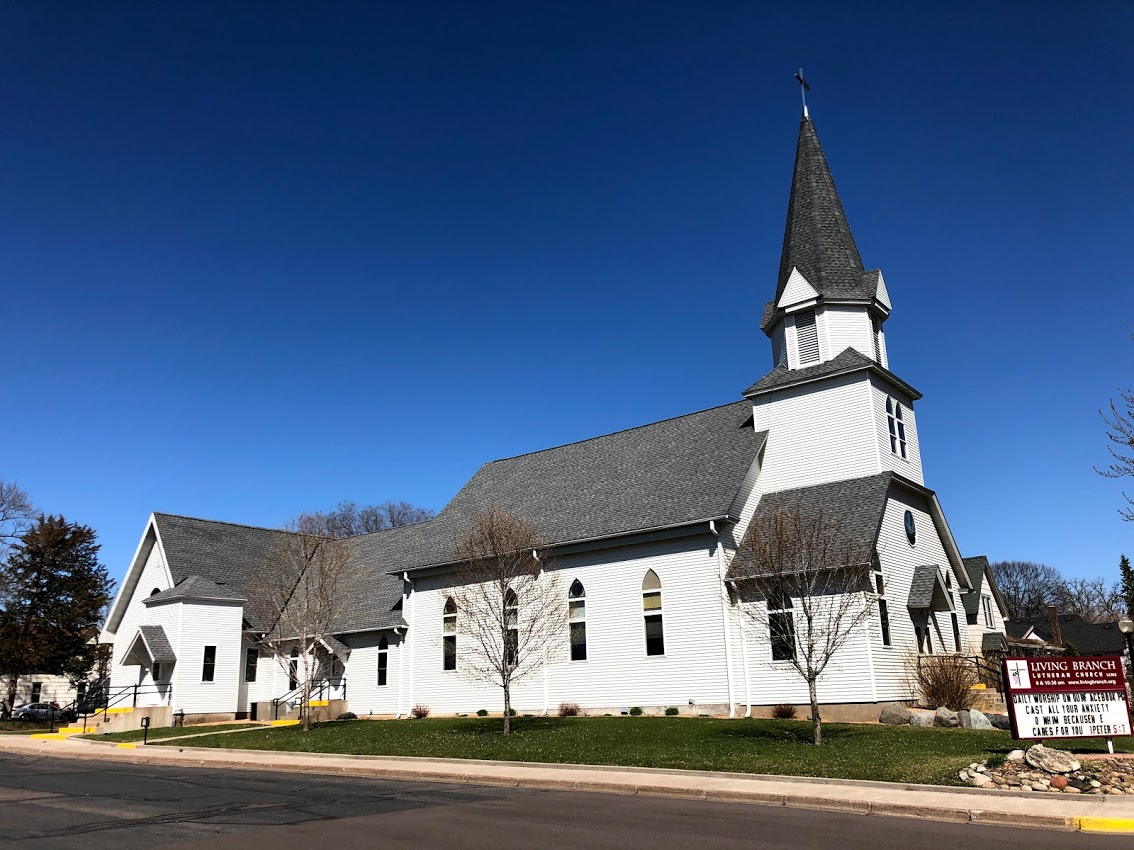
Living Branch Lutheran Church in North Branch, MN.

The first organized emigrants from Norway to the United States were religious dissenters on the Restauration during 1825. It is widely considered that many of them had Quaker sympathies, but it is also clear that many were Haugeans, adherents of the lay preacher Hans Nielsen Hauge, who was a devout Lutheran but at odds with the established Norwegian State Church. Many of these emigrants subsequently relocated to the Fox River Settlement in LaSalle County, Illinois. By most accounts, the first minister at Fox River was a layman by the name of Ole Olsen Hetletvedt (1797–1854), a Haugean in leaning. He was one of the early Norwegian settlers who had crossed the Atlantic Ocean in 1825 onboard the Restauration.

In 1839, Elling Eielsen, a lay preacher, was a leader in the Haugean pietistic state church reform movement which encouraged evangelism and vigorous lay leadership. He made it his mission to return the growing Fox River Norwegian colony to the Lutheran fold. He organized a house of assembly and was ordained a Lutheran pastor in 1843 in the German-Lutheran tradition. The Evangelical Lutheran Church in America, known as the Eielsen Synod, founded in 1846 at the Jefferson Prairie Settlement, was named in his honor. Eislsen was resident pastor at Jefferson Prairie from 1846 to 1872.

The Jefferson Prairie Settlement Lutheran Church was organized in 1844. Claus Lauritz Clausen accepted a call during 1846 from Norwegian-settlers at Jefferson Prairie. Clausen relocated from the Muskego Settlement and made this the center for his activities among the settlements in southern Wisconsin and northern Illinois, remaining until 1853. Johannes Wilhelm Christian Dietrichson organized Koshkonong, Luther Valley, and eight other congregations in the state of Wisconsin and served as pastor at Koshkonong from 1846 until 1850.

In February 1853, several Lutheran ministers including Claus Lauritz Clausen, Hans Andreas Stub, A. C. Preus, Herman Amberg Preus, G. F. Dietrichson, Jacob Aall Ottesen, and R. D. Brandt organized the Synod of the Norwegian Evangelical Lutheran Church in America, commonly known as the Norwegian Synod. It Jacob Aall Ottesen was organized at Koshkonong and Luther Valley near the Jefferson Prairie Settlement. Among the first denominational leaders was Ulrik Vilhelm Koren. The Synod adopted the rituals of the Church of Norway. The Eielsen Synod struck an uncompromising doctrinal line for many Norwegian immigrants. In 1848, Paul Andersen and Ole Andrewson broke out of Eielsen's Synod and started the first Norwegian and Scandinavian Church in Chicago, joining the Franckean Synod. The Frankean Synod was noted for its socially progressive views. They stayed in this synod for only three years before joining the Northern Illinois Synod. In 1860, the same group started yet another synod, the Scandinavian Augustana Synod, over theological differences with English speaking Lutherans, who they believed were not faithful to the Augsburg Confession.

In 1870, the Norwegian and Danish churches left the Scandinavian Augustana Synod and formed two new church bodies: the Conference of the Norwegian-Danish Evangelical Lutheran Church of America and Norwegian Augustana Synod.

The Hauge Synod was formed in 1876 following a split with the Eielsen Synod. The Hauge Synod was named after Norwegian revivalist lay preacher Hans Nielsen Hauge. Red Wing Seminary, located in Red Wing, Minnesota, was the Hauge Synod educational center. The United Norwegian Lutheran Church of America was the result of the union formed in 1890 between the Norwegian Augustana Synod, the Conference of the Norwegian-Danish Evangelical Lutheran Church of America, and the Anti-Missourian Brotherhood which had dated from 1887.

Altar at Mindekirken in Minneapolis

== Norwegian-language churches ==
Although many churches in America have their roots with Norwegian settlers, most have abandoned the Norwegian language in the primary service. Two churches in the United States still use Norwegian as a primary liturgical language. They are Den Norske Lutherske Minnekirke, built in 1912 in Chicago, Illinois, and Den Norske Lutherske Mindekirke in Minneapolis, Minnesota, formed in 1922.

== Norwegian Lutheran Church bodies in the US ==
- Eielsen Synod (1846–1997)
- Norwegian Synod (1853–1917)
- Norwegian Augustana Synod (1870–1890)
- Conference of the Norwegian-Danish Evangelical Lutheran Church of America (1870–1890)
- Hauge Synod (1876–1917)
- Anti-Missourian Brotherhood (1887–1890)
- United Norwegian Lutheran Church of America (1890–1917)
- Lutheran Free Church (1897–1963)
- Church of the Lutheran Brethren of America (1900–present)
- The Evangelical Lutheran Church (1917–1960)
- Evangelical Lutheran Synod (1918–present)
- Association of Free Lutheran Congregations (1962–present)

== Norwegian Lutheran colleges in the US ==
- Augsburg University Minneapolis, Minnesota
- Augustana University Sioux Falls, South Dakota
- Bethany Lutheran College Mankato, Minnesota
- Concordia College Moorhead, Minnesota
- Luther College Decorah, Iowa
- Pacific Lutheran University Parkland, Washington
- St. Olaf College Northfield, Minnesota
- Waldorf College Forest City, Iowa

== Other sources ==
- Blegen, Theodore C (1940), Norwegian Migration to America: The American Transition, (Northfield, MN: The Norwegian-American Historical Association)
- Lovoll, Odd Sverre (1984), The Promise of America: A History of the Norwegian-American People, (Minneapolis, MN: The University of Minnesota Press), ISBN 0-8166-1331-1
- Nelson, E. Clifford; Fevold, Eugene L. (1960), The Lutheran Church among Norwegian-Americans: a history of the Evangelical Lutheran Church, (Minneapolis, MN: Augsburg Publishing)
- Nichol, Todd W; Preus, Herman Amberg (1990), Vivacious Daughter - Seven Lectures on the Religious Situation Among Norwegians in America, (Northfield, MN: The Norwegian-American Historical Association), ISBN 0-87732-078-0
- Roseland, Jens Christian (1890), American Lutheran Biographies, (Milwaukee,WI: Press of A. Houtkamp & Son)
- Stephenson, George M (1926), Norwegian-American Lutheran Church History, (Northfield, MN: The Norwegian-American Historical Association)

== Related reading ==
- Fevold, Eugene L. The Norwegian Immigrant and His Church (Norwegian American Historic Association. Volume 23: Page 3)
- Koren, Ulrik Vilhelm Why Is There No Church Unity Among Norwegian Lutherans In America? ( Kirkentidende in 1905, Koren’s Samlede Skrifter, pp. 454-498 – translation by C. U. Faye)
- Teigen, Erling T. The Legacy of Jakob Aall Ottesen and The Enduring Legacy of Preus, Koren, and Ottesen (Bethany Lutheran College, Mankato, MN, October 30-31, 2003)
