= Theodora Cormontan =

Norwegian-American pianist, music publisher and composer (1840–1922)

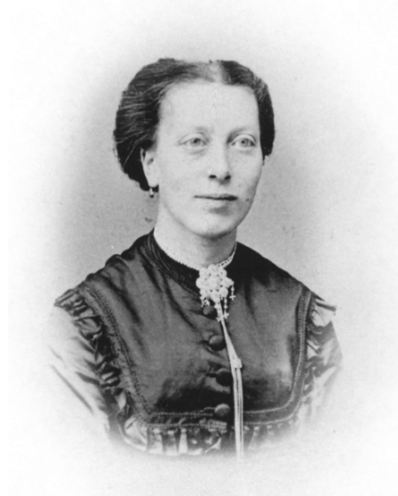
Theodora Cormontan, about 1870

Theodora Cormontan (June 9, 1840 – October 26, 1922) was a Norwegian-American singer, church musician, pianist, music publisher and composer, one of the first Norwegian women to have her classical compositions published and widely performed, and one of the first women to start a music publishing business in Norway.

== Overview ==
Cormontan began her musical education with the town musician in Arendal, where her father served as a Lutheran pastor. She moved to Copenhagen in 1863 to continue her education and pursue a musical career. Her time there was cut short by the death of her mother in 1865, prompting her return to Arendal to run the household of her father. After returning to Copenhagen in 1867–1868 and giving a concert tour in Norway in 1869, from 1872 until 1879 she continued her career in Arendal, giving both vocal and piano concerts, composing works for the piano and voice (a number of which were published by Warmuth, the leading music publisher in the region), and establishing a music lending library. In 1879 she opened a music publishing house, focusing on the works of women composers.

In 1886, as a result of a major bank failure and a fire that destroyed the family home, Cormontan was forced to sell her music business and immigrate with her father and sister to the United States, where she continued her musical career. In 1887, shortly after her arrival in Sacred Heart, Minnesota, a train accident impaired Cormontan's mobility and her ability to stand, forcing her to give up voice recitals. She focused instead on piano and organ performances as well as giving music lessons, leading choirs, and continuing her composition work, living first with a married sister in Sacred Heart, then with two brothers in Franklin, Minnesota.

The family's economic fortunes slowly declined after 1900. In 1910, at age 70, Theodora Cormontan was the youngest of four surviving unmarried siblings and was the main wage earner in the household. After the deaths of her brothers, Cormontan and her sister entered a home for elderly Norwegian immigrants in Decorah, Iowa, in 1917. After her death in 1922, her compositions largely disappeared from view until 2011, when boxes containing her musical legacy were discovered in St. Peter, Minnesota, and recordings of her work were released in Norway, Denmark, and the US.

== Early life ==
Theodora Nicoline Meldal Cormontan was born June 9, 1840, in Beitstad in Nord-Trøndelag, Norway, the second youngest of seven children of Lutheran minister Even Meldal Schjelderup Cormontan and Louise Augusta Hirsch Cormontan. In 1847 her family moved to Arendal, where her father was appointed to the Trinity Church. She studied music there with F. W. Thoschlag, the town organist and proprietor of a music lending library. In 1863 she moved to Copenhagen to study music. The death of her mother in 1865 forced her return to Arendal to run the household of her father, who had taken on additional church duties as provst (in English, dean), a senior official in the diocese.

== Early career and publishing business ==
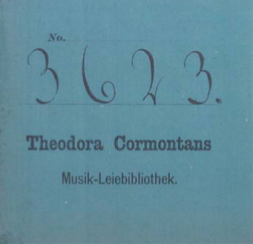
Index card from Cormontan's music library

In 1867–1868 Cormontan returned to Copenhagen to sing professionally and offer voice lessons. She studied singing with Carl Helsted, a renowned teacher who also trained Nina Hagerup, first cousin and future wife of Edvard Grieg. In 1869 Cormontan concertized as a soprano soloist in a tour that included the Norwegian coastal towns of Grimstad, Kristiansand, Stavanger, and Bergen, as well as Trondheim and Larvik. The 6 March 1869 Kristiansand newspaper announced that her program would include Gounod's "Jewel Song" from the opera Faust and "Tacea la note placida" from Verdi's opera Il trovatore. A review on 9 March in a newspaper included the following: "The concert featured a singer in possession of a full, rich and sonorous soprano voice of a rare and pleasant character. Her singing reflected favorably upon her training; we would particularly note her beautiful and correct intonation ... All the numbers were received with lively applause that was so powerful that the singer visibly shuddered, and at the end of the concert was moved to tears." A serious illness halted her professional activity in 1870 and most of 1871. She may have studied theory and harmony during this time, because in 1872 she began performing her own compositions in concert.

Subsequently, Cormontan established a music lending library. Because of the expense of publication, music lending libraries were a common feature of 19th-century musical culture. From 1875 until 1879 several of her compositions were published by Warmuth, the leading Scandinavian music publisher of the era. In addition to her vocal and piano concerts, and composing classical piano pieces and songs in Arendal, Cormontan ran a music publishing business from 1879 to 1886. Her publishing house specialized in the work of other women composers. This includes Sophie Dedekam, a composer of hymns and popular songs, and Caroline Schytte Jensen, who went on to become a well-known composer of children's songs – she was also the mother of Gabriel Scott, a Norwegian poet. Cormontan was the first to publish, in 1885, the first five of what would later become Schytte Jensen's famous collection of children's songs, as well as the highly regarded Katharina Månsdotters vaggvisa fôr konung Erik XIV (music set to the poem by Zachris Topelius).

From the 1870s through 1884, Cormontan's sheet music publications were distributed throughout Norway, Sweden, Denmark. Germany and Russia. Among the pieces she published was a song she dedicated to a younger pianist and composer, Agathe Backer Grøndahl (her cousin, Nils Backer, was postmaster of Arendal), proclaimed by George Bernard Shaw in 1889 "one of the greatest pianists in Europe."

== Emigration, career in the United States ==
As a result of a major bank failure, as well as a fire that destroyed the family home, the now-retired Reverend Cormontan, along with Theodora and her sister Eivinda, immigrated to America in 1887 to live first with his daughter and then two sons, all of whom had previously immigrated. Upon her arrival Cormontan continued her musical career in Sacred Heart, Minnesota, giving a series of recitals, both piano and voice, and advertising as a music instructor throughout the region. On December 3, 1887, she was injured in a train accident in Granite Falls, Minnesota. She suffered trauma to her spine, and for the remainder of her life experienced a level of chronic pain and physical challenges related to mobility.

In 1889, Cormontan brought a civil suit against the railroad involved in her accident. The company, after offering a $500 settlement, contested the suit over a period of several months, to the point where Cormontan's family incurred over $300 in legal fees and related expenses. The legal counsel for the railroad deposed Theodora and her sister Eivinda each for a full day of testimony, in addition to bringing witnesses to cast doubt on the extent of her injury. The jury awarded Cormontan $5,000, and the railroad was also ordered to pay all of her legal expenses.

In 1888, Cormontan, her father, and her sister Eivinda moved to Franklin, Minnesota, to live with her older brother, Gottfred Christian Vogelsang (C.G.V.). He held a degree in chemistry from Norway and opened a drug store in Franklin with his brother-in-law, Edward Lyders. The family joined the local Norwegian Synod Church and Cormontan was employed as organist for both that church and another in the area. Rev. Cormontan died in 1893 and was buried in a place of honor next to the Fort Ridgely & Dale Church.

Cormontan's train injury compelled her to cease giving voice recitals (which would have required her to stand for extended periods of time), but she continued her career as a music teacher, organist, pianist, choir director, and composer. As a performer in the 1890s, she received highly favorable reviews from numerous local newspapers for her recitals throughout southern Minnesota: her concerts were characterized as a "rare treat," with some attendees gathered outside the town hall entrance and listening from open windows.

As late as 1910, at age 69, Cormontan was performing at public gatherings such as conventions and public information sessions for the Red Cross and Farmer's Institute, being described as "a pianist of rare ability." Cormontan was composing and copyrighting works for piano as late as December 1911.

== Lutheran Synod dispute ==
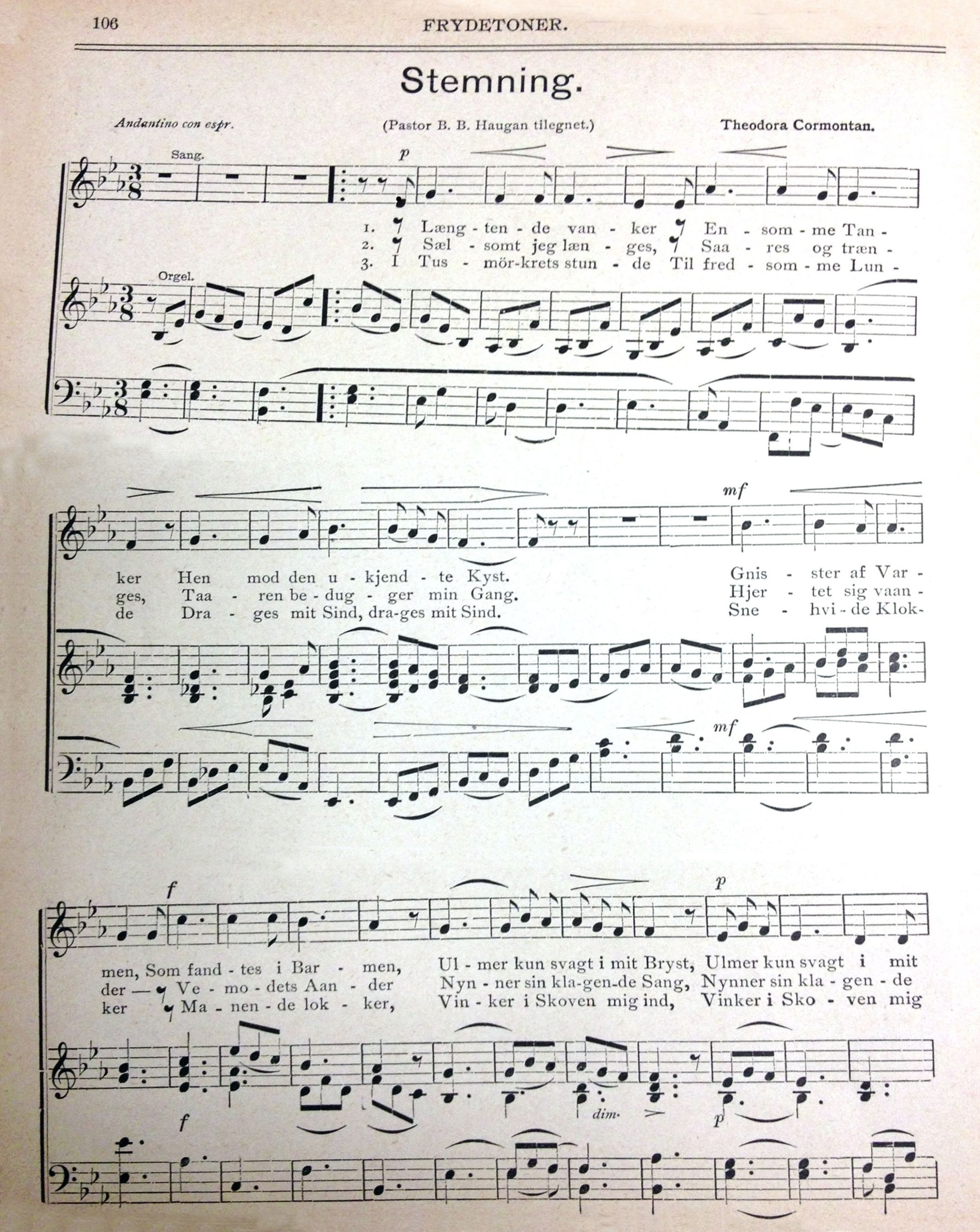
Page 106 from Ungdommens Ven, Norwegian Lutheran song book, Hauge Synod, 1892; dedicated to Pastor Haugan by Cormontan

From 1890 until 1912, Cormontan was involved in a dispute between the Norwegian Synod and the Hauge Synod. The Hauge Synod was pro-temperance and revivalist in nature, and published "spirituals" in Norwegian as an alternative to the traditional Lutheran hymns of the Norwegian Synod. Cormontan was a member of the Norwegian Synod, and her father had been a long-serving minister and official in the Norwegian Church, parent church of the Norwegian Synod.

Cormontan contributed several hymns to the Hauge Synod magazine, Ungdommens Ven, including one she dedicated to Reverend Bernt B. Haugan, a Hauge Synod minister and temperance advocate. He published, in partnership with Nils Nilsen Ronning, a journalist and author, the songbook Frydetoner (Joyful Tunes), a collection of songs from the magazine which included Cormontan's contributions. In response, the Norwegian Synod passed resolutions of disapproval in 1896 and 1901, the 1896 resolution declaring "Books such as Harpen, by Hoyme and Lund, and Frydetoner, by B. B. Haugan, ought not to be distributed by the Lutheran Publishing House in Decorah."

In the period from 1890 until 1917, while maintaining her membership first in the Norwegian Synod and then the United Synod, Cormontan's hymns continued to be included in each subsequent edition of Frydetoner, a hymn book that was, despite official disapproval, enormously popular in Norwegian-American communities, going through at least 25 printings. This dispute was not fully resolved until 1917, when the synods agreed to merge (along with the United Norwegian Lutheran Church of America), forming the Norwegian Lutheran Church of America, although some progress was made in 1913 when the three synods collaborated in producing their first unified hymnal in English, The Lutheran Hymnary. Cormontan's best-known hymn, "Høgt frå den himmelske klåra" ("High from the Clearing Heavens"), remained in the Church of Norway's hymnal, and is still included in current editions.

== Changes in family fortunes, retirement ==
As an unmarried woman in the 19th century, Cormontan's financial fortunes were closely tied to that of her family. She lived with siblings her entire time in the U.S., first with her married youngest sister Marie and Marie's husband Edward Lyders (a pharmacist in Sacred Heart), then with her older brother in Franklin. While C.G.V. Cormontan (her brother) ran a drugstore in Franklin, the family fortunes were relatively stable. In 1891, after the $5,000 settlement from the railroad lawsuit, the Cormontan family purchased and donated a Packard organ to the Fort Ridgely & Dale Church.

After Rev. Cormontan's death in 1893, C.G.V. Cormontan became the head of the household. As he aged, the fortunes of C.G.V. declined until he was forced to close his Madelia, Minnesota, drugstore and move to Hanska, Minnesota, in 1901 to work for a pharmacist there. In 1910, the Cormontan household consisted of four siblings, of which Theodora was the youngest at age 70. As was common for the childless elderly in that era, the family slid into poverty and became dependent on county and church assistance to survive. The Cormontan household was listed on county relief records for disbursements to the poor in 1915. Shortly after C.G.V. Cormontan died in 1917, Theodora and her sister Eivinda entered the Aase Haugen Home near Decorah, Iowa, a home that had recently opened and was operated by the United Norwegian Lutheran Church. Cormontan died at the home in 1922 at age 82; her sister Eivinda died there two years later. Both were buried in the Home cemetery. Cormontan's compositions and publications were put in boxes and stored by Mollie Helgerson Schmidt, wife of Rev. Otto Schmidt, the superintendent and founder of the Home.

== Legacy ==
=== Composing legacy ===
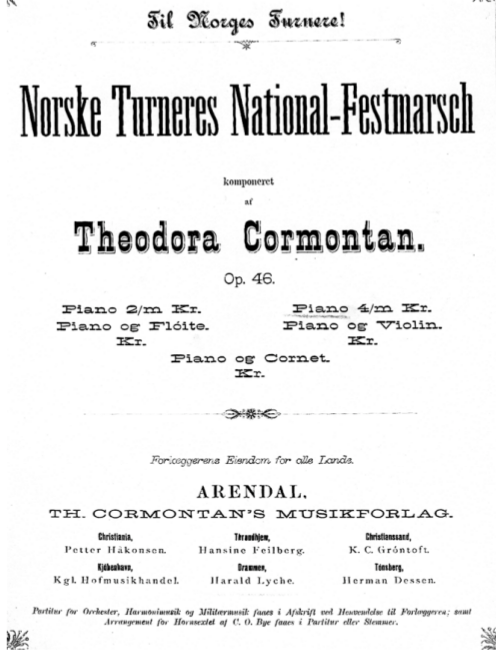
Sheet music from Cormontan's publishing business, 1879

Except for one hymn and one song, Cormontan's musical legacy disappeared from view for the next 80 years. The hymn, Høgt frå den himmelske klåra ("High from the Clearing Heavens") remained a standard in the hymnal of the Church of Norway.

In 1988 one of Cormontan's songs, "Aftendæmring" ("Twilight"), was sung by the actor and musical theater performer Christian Steffensen as part of an album of Hans Christian Andersen poems set to music. The song was singled out for special praise in a review of the album in Fanfare magazine, and Steffensen continued to include it in his repertoire, releasing recordings of it in both Danish and English over the next 35 years, most recently re-releasing it in 2012 on the album In Denmark I Was Born (the album includes music by two Norwegian composers, Edvard Grieg and Cormontan). Norwegian pianist Monica Tomescu-Rohde released a recording of piano music composed by Theodora Cormontan on September 20, 2024. “Cor montan” is Latin for “Heart of the Mountain,” the title of the recording. On December 12, 2025, Tomescu-Rohde released a second recording of piano solo works by Cormontan entitled “Heart of the Mountain Vol. 2: My Home.”

=== Library and publishing legacy ===
Music that Cormontan published in the period 1879 to 1886 can be found in the archives of the Aust-Agder kulturhistoriske senter, Arendal, and in the collection of Michael and Bonnie Jorgensen, an emeritus professor of music at Gustavus Adolphus College, and a professional pianist, respectively.

The granddaughter of Mollie Schmidt (wife of the superintendent of the nursing home where Cormontan spent her final years) gifted Cormontan's musical library to the Jorgensens in May, 2011 after a chance meeting in a grocery store in St. Peter, Minnesota. Bonnie and Michael Jorgensen have presented lectures and concerts, recorded a number of Cormontan's compositions, and created a website, theodoracormontan.com, to document Cormontan's story and legacy.

On May 28, 2015, the Jorgensens donated Theodora Cormontan's published and manuscript scores to the National Library of Norway in Oslo and performed her music there with a group of musician friends, including Mollie Schmidt's granddaughter. On May 31, 2015, they gave a concert in Cormontan's hometown of Arendal at the Aust-Agder kulturhistoriske senter (KUBEN)."

== List of works ==
Published in Norway:

- 4 Sange [4 Songs] Op. 2 /Hvad jeg elsker [What I Love] (voice/piano; Hans Christian Andersen text), Warmuth Publishing Company, 1875
- Blandt Fjeldene [Among Mountains] Op. 3 (piano), Warmuth, 1875
- 3 Religiøse Sange [3 Religious Songs] Op. 5 /Dyb Sne [Deep Snow] (2 voices/piano; Halfdan Sommerfelt text), Warmuth, 1877
- 3 Sange Op. 4 /Aftendæmring [Twilight] (voice/piano; H. C. Andersen), Warmuth, 1877
- 4 Sange Op. 6 /Holder du af mig [If you like me] (voice/piano; Bjørnstjerne Bjørnson text), Warmuth, 1879
- 4 Sange Op. 1 /Det døende Barn [The dying Children] (voice/piano; H. C. Andersen), Cormontan Publishing Company, c 1880
- Hvad ønsker du mer? [What would you like more?] Op. 8.1 (2 voices/piano; F. W. Krummacher text), Cormontan, c 1880
- Fred til Bod for bittert Savn [Peace of Penance for bitter Longing] Fantasie-Transcription (piano), Cormontan, 1883
- Herre Jesu Christ [Lord Jesus Christ] Fantasie-Transcription Op. 36 (piano), Cormontan, 1885
- Honnør-Marsch for norske Turnere [Honor March for Norwegian Turners] Op. 44 (piano), Cormontan, 1885
- Kjærlighed er Livets Kilde [Love is the Source of Life] Fantasie-Transcription Op. 42 (piano), Cormontan, 1885
- La Eleganza [Elegance] Menuet Op. 10 (piano), Cormontan, 1885
- Norsk Konge-Polonaise [Norwegian King-Polonaise] Op. 43 (piano), Cormontan, 1885
- Norske Turneres National-Festmarsch [Norwegian Turners National Festival March] Op. 46 (piano), Cormontan, 1885
- Til Kirke [The Church] Op. 8.2 (voice/piano; H. Sommerfelt), Cormontan, 1885

Published in the United States (all piano solo):

- Waltz Gracious Op. 53, Johnson and Lundquist, (n.d.)
- Polka Fantasia over Swedish Song Op. 54, Thompson, 1895
- L'Elegance Op. 10 (same piece as Op. 10 above), Hatch, 1900
- A Jubilee Rhineländer Op. 58, Pioneer, 1905
- Dance de la Duchesse Op. 59, (publisher unknown), 1906
