= Østen Hanson =

American Lutheran minister

The Reverend Østen Hanson
- Hanson c. 1896
- Native name: Østen Hanson
- Church: Hauge Synod of the Lutheran Church

Orders
- Ordination: 1861 by Elling Eielsen

Personal details
- Born: July 8, 1836 Sauherad, Telemark, Norway
- Died: August 4, 1898 (aged 62) Wanamingo, Minnesota, U.S.
- Denomination: Haugeanism

Østen Hanson (July 8, 1836 – August 4, 1898) also known as Osten Hanson or Osten Hanson Holtan, was a Norwegian-American Lutheran minister and an early citizen of Wanamingo, Minnesota. Hanson was a follower of Hans Nielsen Hauge and the Haugean movement. During his career Hanson was the president and vice president of the Hauge Synod in Minnesota and was the president of the board of regents for the Red Wing Seminary.

== Early life and family ==
Hanson was born on July 8, 1836, in Saude, in Telemark to parents Hans Hansen Holtan Sr. and Gunhild Holtan (née Veium).^{:219} Hanson was the younger brother of Minnesota politician and farmer Hans Holtan.

Hanson emigrated to the United States in 1851 at the age of fifteen and settled in Rio, Wisconsin.^{:414}^{:122} While in Wisconsin Hanson became a follower of the Haugean movement.^{:122} Hanson eventually moved to Minnesota Territory in 1856 and settled with his brother, Hans Holtan, in Wanamingo, Minnesota.^{:414}

== Career ==
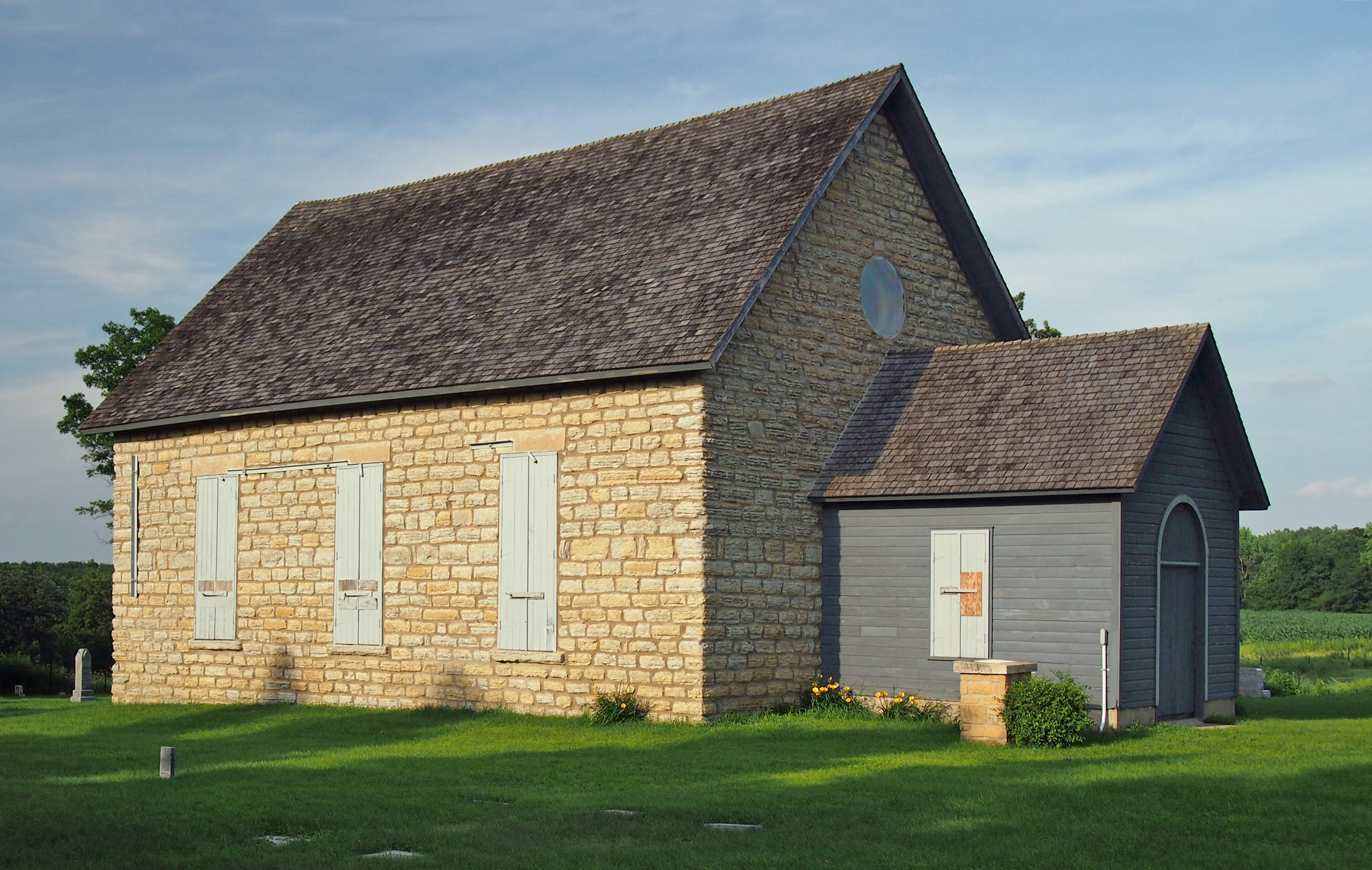
Hanson's Hauge Lutheran Church in Kenyon, Minnesota

Hanson was ordained at the age of 25 in 1861^{:219} by Elling Eielsen.^{:122} Hanson served the Lutheran congregations at Aspelund, Kenyon, and Roscoe Township in Goodhue County, Minnesota.^{:414} Hanson served as the president of the Hauge Synod from 1875 to 1876, and the vice president of the Hague Synod from 1887 to 1893^{:219}^{:414} Hanson was also the associate editor of the Norwegian religious publication The Messenger (Norwegian: Budhæreren) from 1868 to 1876.^{:219}

== Later life and death ==
Hanson was a friend and associate of Bernt Julius Muus who also settled in Goodhue County.^{:123} Although Hanson and Muus had differing opinions on Lutheranism as well as education, Hanson preached to Muus's congregations in Minnesota.^{:124-125} Hanson later became the president of the board of regents of the Red Wing Seminary, a Lutheran seminary located in Red Wing, Minnesota.^{:414}

Hanson died on August 4, 1898.^{:219}

== Personal life ==
Hanson was married twice during his life. Hanson's first wife was Marie Sophie Gulbransen who he married in 1859.^{:219} Hanson's second wife was Anne Haavern (Hoven) who he married in 1868.^{:219}
