= Hans Holtan =

American politician

Hans H. Holtan
- Ambrotype of Holtan c. 1858

Member of the Minnesota House of Representatives from the 6th district
- In office December 2, 1857 – December 6, 1859 Serving with Henry L. Bevans, Charles W. Libbey, and Joseph Peckham
- Governor: Samuel Medary; Henry Hastings Sibley
- Preceded by: Position established
- Succeeded by: Isaac C. Stearns, John S. Letford, R.H. Knox, and Lewis Hector Garrard

Personal details
- Born: December 14, 1820 Lunde Municipality, Telemark, Norway
- Died: September 4, 1904 (aged 83) Wanamingo, Minnesota, U.S.

Hans Hanson Holtan Jr. (December 14, 1820 – September 4, 1904), sometimes called Hans Hanson or Hans Holton, was a Norwegian-American politician and early citizen of Wanamingo, Minnesota. Holtan served a single term in the Minnesota House of Representatives. Holtan is noted as the first Norwegian to hold public office in Goodhue County, Minnesota.^{:336}

== Early life and family ==
Holtan was born on December 14, 1820, in Norway.^{:891}^{:610} Holtan was the son of Hans Hanson Holtan Senior. The first volume of the book Nordmændene i Amerika (Norwegians in America) written by Martin Ulvestad states that Holtan was born in Lunde Municipality (Lunde prestegjeld) in Telemark.^{:375} Holtan's brother, Østen Hanson, was also the son of Hans Hanson Holtan Senior.^{:669} The second volume of the book Nordmændene i Amerika also lists Østen's birthplace as Telemark.^{:669}

== Career ==
Holtan emigrated to the United States in 1845 and originally settled in Chicago.^{:891} In 1849 Holtan moved northwest to Belvidere, Illinois, before moving further north to Portage, Wisconsin a year later in 1850.^{:891}^{:610} In 1856 Holtan purchased 160 acres of land in Minnesota Territory near modern-day Wanamingo, Minnesota in Goodhue County.^{:891}^{:610} Holtan sold his property due to being sick, he later purchased 400 acres in Wanamingo where he farmed and built a home.^{:891}^{:610} Holtan's brother Østen also moved to Wanamingo in 1856.^{:414} Østen was a Lutheran minister who served the communities of Aspelund, Kenyon, and Roscoe in Goodhue County.^{:414} Østen was later the president of the board of regents of the Red Wing Seminary.^{:414}

Holtan was elected to the Minnesota House of Representatives on October 13, 1857, representing Minnesota's 6th House district. Holtan was sworn into office on December 11, 1857. Holtan served during the 1st Minnesota Legislature, during his term Holtan was a member of the printing committee.

== Later life and death ==
Following his term in the Minnesota House, Holtan served as a city supervisor in Wanamingo, Minnesota in the years 1863, 1864, and from 1870 to 1873.^{:224}^{:470} Holtan also served as an overseer of the poor for Wanamingo in 1868.^{:224}^{:471}

Holtan died on September 4, 1904.^{:891}

== Personal life ==
Holtan was married three times in his life. Holtan was first married to Aline Svenungsdatter on July 4, 1848, together they had two children.^{:891} Aline died on August 12, 1855.^{:891} Holtan's second wife was Anna Maria Pedersdatter Nostebiae, who Holtan married on October 31, 1857 in Faribault, Minnesota, together they had six children.^{:891} Anna died on January 13, 1876.^{:891} Holtan's third wife was married to Sophia Mosleth on July 11, 1877, together they had six children.^{:891}
