= Danish Evangelical Lutheran Church Association in America =

Defunct Christian denomination in the United States

- Det Danske Evangeliske Lutherske Kirkesamfund i Amerika
- Abbreviation: Blair Church, Danish Association
- Classification: Lutheran
- Region: United States
- Headquarters: Blair, Nebraska
- Origin: 1884; Argo, Nebraska
- Separated from: Conference of the Norwegian-Danish Evangelical Lutheran Church of America
- Merged into: United Evangelical Lutheran Church (1896)
- Ministers: 16
- Missionaries: 1

Danish Evangelical Lutheran Church Association in America (often known as the Blair Church) was a Lutheran church body that existed in the United States from 1884 to 1896, when it merged into the United Danish Evangelical Lutheran Church.

== History ==
The Danish Evangelical Lutheran Church Association in America, or simply the Blair Church or the Danish Association, was founded in 1884 when a group of Danish congregations left the Conference of the Norwegian-Danish Evangelical Lutheran Church of America. The Danish Association was founded at a meeting in Argo, Nebraska, and moved to nearby Blair, Nebraska after its founding.

The Danish Association created Trinity Seminary on October 21, 1886 in Blair, Nebraska, with Anton Marius Andersen as the first president.

In 1896, the Danish Association merged with the Danish Evangelical Lutheran Church in North America to form the United Danish Evangelical Lutheran Church.
