= Weisselberg =

Weisselberg or Weißelberg is a surname and may refer to:

- Ernst Weißelberg (1883–1972), German CDU politician, Lord Mayor of Siegen
- Roland Weisselberg (1933–2006), German Lutheran minister who self-immolated
- Allen Weisselberg (born 1947), American businessman and CFO of the Trump Organization
- Jörg Weißelberg (born 1968), German guitarist, songwriter and music producer

== See also ==
- der Weiselberg, a hill in Germany
