= Christiane Koren =

Danish-Norwegian writer

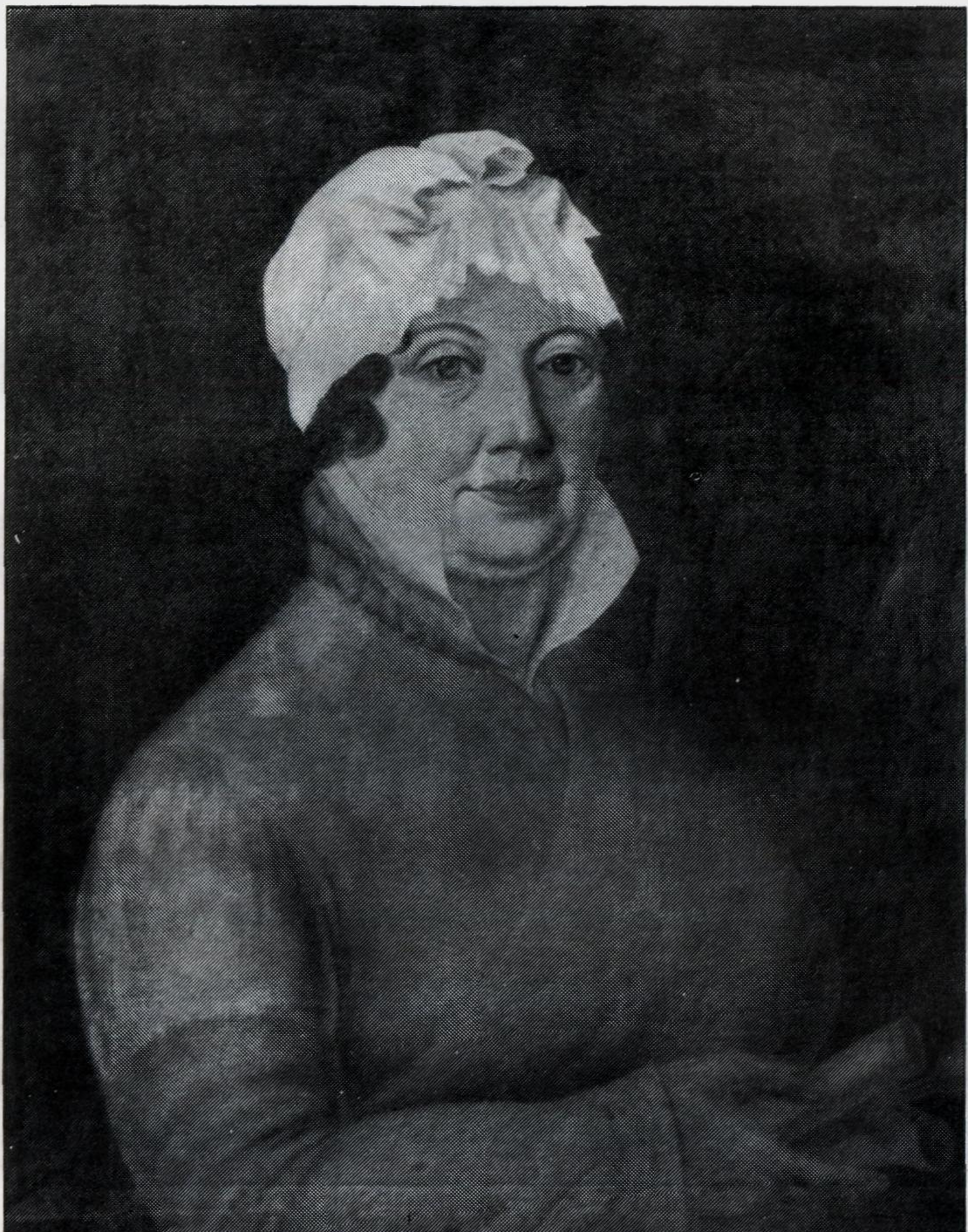
Christiane Koren from Moer Korens dagbøge (1915)

Christiane Koren (27 July 1764 – 28 January 1815) was a Danish-Norwegian writer. She wrote both poems and plays, but today she is primarily known for her diaries, which are regarded to be important historical documents of contemporary Norway.

== Biography ==
Christiane Birgitte Diederichsen was born at Kastrup in Amager, Denmark. She was the daughter of Jess Didrichsen, owner of Kastrup Værk on the Danish island of Amager. In Copenhagen, she socialized within Det Norske Selskab and formed an attachment with Swedish professor Carl Frederik Dichmann. .

In 1787, she married Norwegian justice Johan Randulf Clausen Koren (1758-1825). The couple left Denmark for Eidsberg in Østfold, Norway where her husband had been appointed judge. She became the mother of eight children, only three of whom reached adulthood. Her daughter Caroline Mathilde Koren (1801-1840) married Ahlert Hysing (1793–1879), who served in the Norwegian Parliament.

== Works ==
She published a collection of poems in 1803. Her personal diaries, including periods from 1808 to 1810 and 1813 to 1815, (Moer Korens dagbøge) were published in 1915. Her description of her travel to Denmark in 1802 (Dagbog for Kristiane Koren paa en Reyse fra Norge til Dannemark begyndt den 6. September 1802) was published in 1945.
