= Norwegian Augustana Synod =

Defunct Christian denomination in the United States

- Classification: Lutheran
- Region: United States
- Origin: 1870
- Separated from: Scandinavian Evangelical Lutheran Augustana Synod in North America
- Merged into: United Norwegian Lutheran Church of America (1890)
- Other name(s): Norwegian-Danish Augustana Synod in America (1870–1878)

Norwegian Augustana Synod (NAS) was a Lutheran church body in the United States from 1870 to 1890. The group's original name was the Norwegian-Danish Augustana Synod in America. The name was shortened in 1878.

== Background ==
The NAS was created out of the Scandinavian Augustana Synod (SAS) in 1870. The NAS was primarily made up of Norwegians (along with some Danes). At the same time the NAS was being formed, another group of Norwegians and Danes created out of the SAS the Conference of the Norwegian-Danish Evangelical Lutheran Church of America (The Conference).

The difference between the NAS and the Conference was the inclusion of the Book of Concord. The NAS wanted to include the whole book as confessional base. The Conference just wanted the three ecumenical creeds, Luther's Small Catechism and the Unaltered Augsburg Confession.

The two groups along the Anti-Missourian Brotherhood group from the Norwegian Synod united in 1890 to form the United Norwegian Lutheran Church of America.

== Presidents ==
- O. J. Hatlestad 1870–1880
- Ole Andrewson 1880–1885
- Andreas Wright 1885–1888
- O. J. Hatlestad 1888–1890

== See also ==
- The Norwegian Lutheran Church in the United States

== Other source ==
- Nelson, E. Clifford, and Fevold, Eugene L. The Lutheran Church among Norwegian-Americans: a history of the Evangelical Lutheran Church (Minneapolis, MN: Augsburg Publishing House, 1960)
