= Anti-Missourian Brotherhood =

Collective of Lutheran pastors in the United States

- Classification: Protestant
- Orientation: Lutheran
- Theology: Confessional Lutheran
- Region: United States, especially in the Upper Midwest
- Origin: 1887; Stoughton, Wisconsin
- Separated from: Synod of the Norwegian Evangelical Lutheran Church in America
- Merged into: United Norwegian Lutheran Church of America (1890)

The Anti-Missourian Brotherhood was the name of a group of Lutheran pastors and churches in the United States who left the Synod of the Norwegian Evangelical Lutheran Church in America (Norwegian Synod) in 1887.

In 1872, the Norwegian Synod had been a co-founder of the Evangelical Lutheran Synodical Conference of North America, along with the Missouri, Wisconsin, and Ohio synods. The Norwegian Synod soon experienced internal division over questions concerning predestination and conversion, a conflict known as the Predestination Controversy (naadevalgsstriden).

During the 1880s about a third of its congregations left. The dispute led to hard feelings and a polarized church body. There were depositions of pastors by their congregations, squabbles over ordinations and the editorial policies of periodicals, and disputed elections of district officers. The Anti-Missourian Brotherhood began to function as an entity within the synod and established its own seminary at St. Olaf College in 1886.

The Anti-Missourians were so named because they disagreed with the predestination position which was associated with the Missouri Synod. The Anti-Missourians opposed the views of C. F. W. Walther of Concordia Seminary in St. Louis, Missouri, on these questions. They left the Norwegian Synod at its annual meeting in Stoughton, Wisconsin, during 1887. Among the leading advocates of the anti-Missourian position were Bernt Julius Muus (founding pastor of St. Olaf College), John N. Kildahl and Thorbjorn N. Mohn (both St. Olaf College presidents), and Luther Seminary Professor Marcus Olaus Bockman.

In 1890, the Anti-Missourian Brotherhood congregations joined with the Norwegian Augustana Synod and the Norwegian-Danish Conference to form the United Norwegian Lutheran Church of America, which was a forerunner of the Evangelical Lutheran Church in America.

== Related Reading ==
- Nelson, E. Clifford (et al.) (1975) The Lutherans in North America (Philadelphia, PA: Fortress Press)
