= Johan Arnd Aasgaard =

American Lutheran church leader (1876–1966)

Johan Arnd Aasgaard (April 5, 1876 – January 13, 1966) was an American Lutheran church leader.

== Biography ==
Johan Arnd Aasgaard was born in Albert Lea, Minnesota. He was educated at St. Olaf College in Northfield, Minnesota (class of 1901). He graduated from the United Church Seminary in Saint Paul, Minnesota (now known as Luther Seminary). He was ordained a minister in the Norwegian Lutheran Church of America, later known as the Evangelical Lutheran Church.

Aasgaard was pastor of Christ Lutheran Church in De Forest, Wisconsin from 1901 to 1911. He taught at United Church Seminary from 1906 to 1907. He served as president of Concordia College in Moorhead, Minnesota from 1911 to 1925. Aasgaard was President of the Norwegian Lutheran Church of America from 1925 to 1954.

Aasgaard subsequently helped lay groundwork for the merger that resulted in formation of American Lutheran Church in 1960. The American Lutheran Church resulted from the merger of the Evangelical Lutheran Church (United States) with the United Evangelical Lutheran Church and a predecessor church body known as the American Lutheran Church.

He was appointed Commander of the Royal Norwegian Order of St. Olav in 1928 and received the Grand Cross in 1945. The personal papers and files of Johan Arnd Aasgaard are maintained in the archives of Luther Seminary in Saint Paul, Minnesota.

Aasgaard died of pneumonia in a hospital in Cokato, Minnesota at age 89.

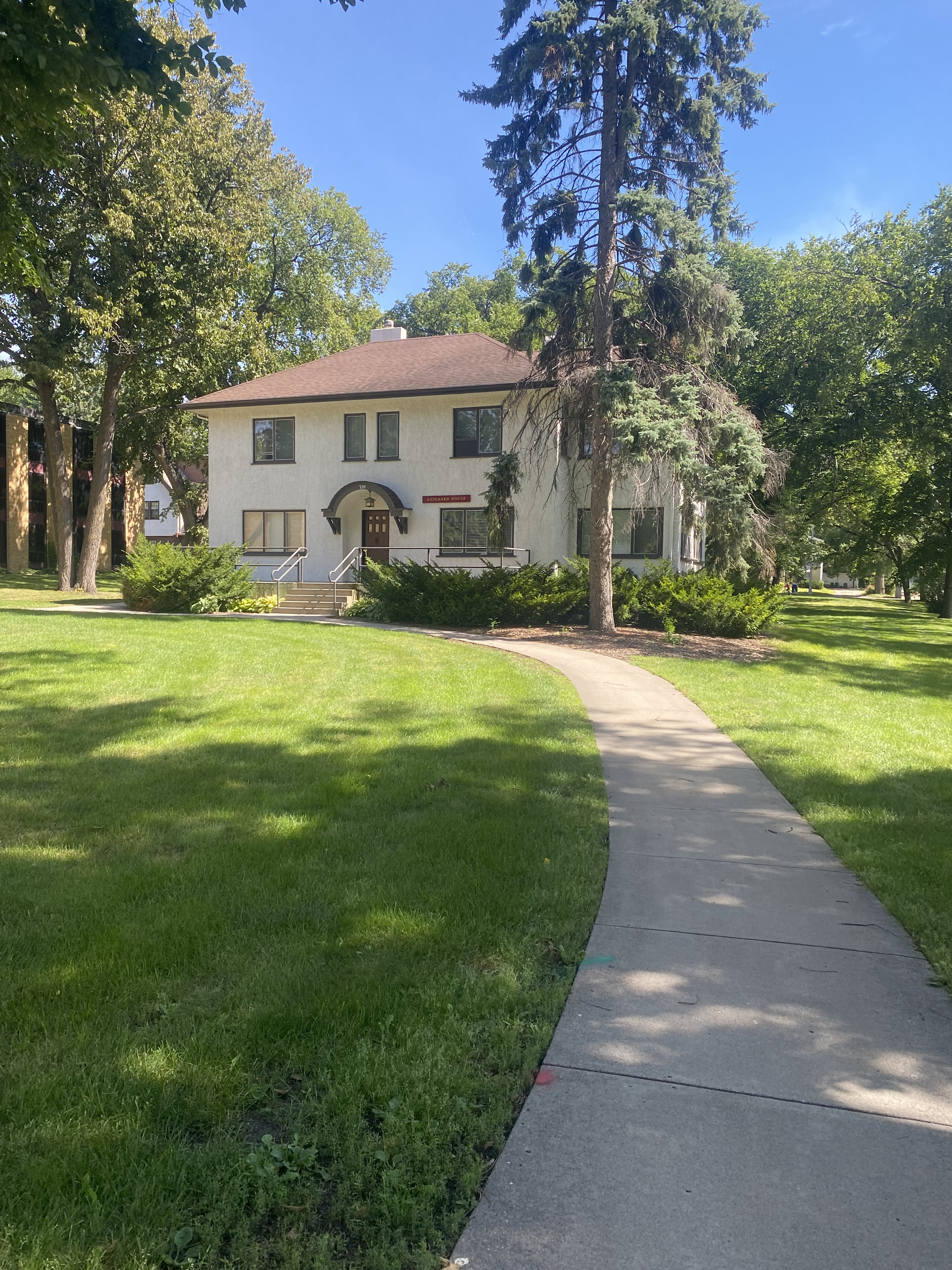
Aasgaard House at Concordia College

Aasgaard House at Concordia College is named after Aasgaard. It was originally used as the presidents' residence, before being used by the home economics department and the communications and marketing office of the college. As of 2016, it hosts research facilities.

== Selected works ==
- Quarter Centennial Souvenir of St. Olaf College, 1874–1899 (Northfield News Print. 1900)
- Address at seventieth anniversary of Luther College (Lutheran Herald, Volume 7. 1933)
- Symbols of the Evangelical Lutheran Church—My Christian Faith (Augsburg Publishing House. 1935)
