= Johan Olsen (pastor) =

American pastor in Lutheran Church in 19th century

Johan Olsen (July 3, 1834 – September 11, 1911) was an American pioneer Lutheran minister and church leader. Olsen served as the second president of the Conference of the Norwegian-Danish Evangelical Lutheran Church of America.

== Biography ==
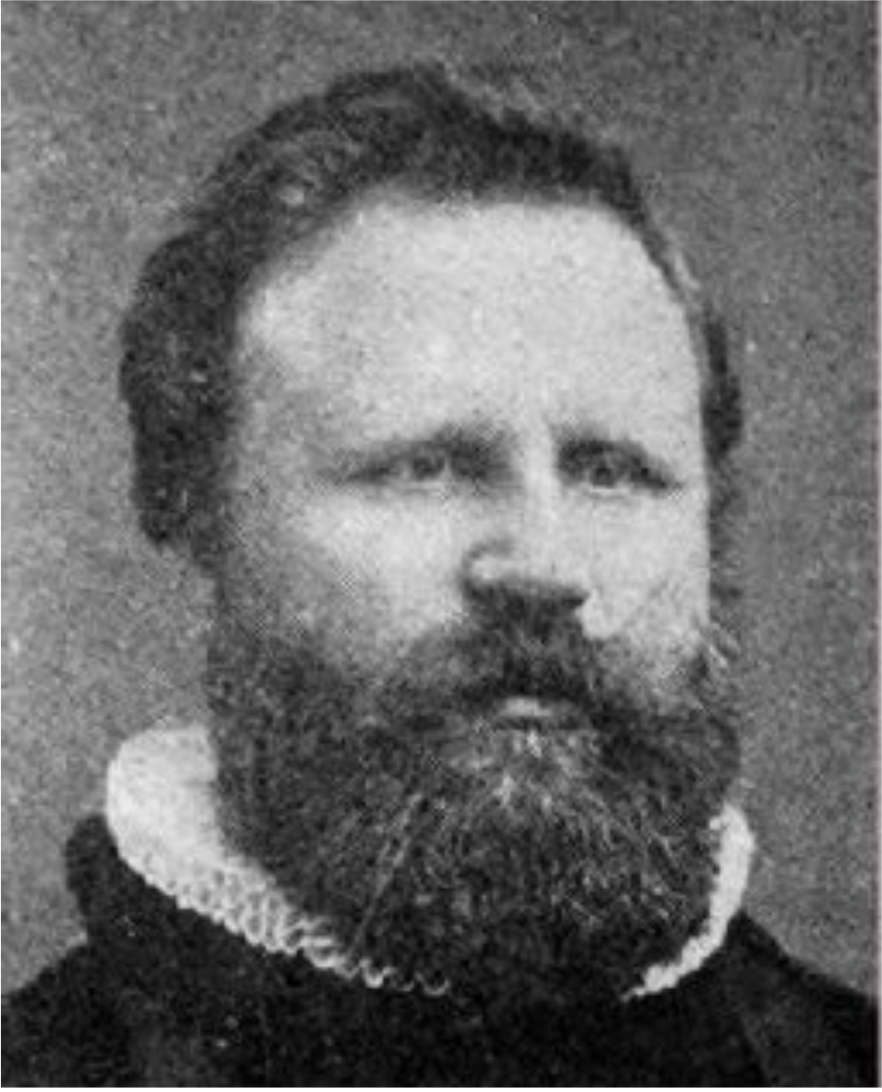
Johan Olsen

Johan Olsen was born in Helgeland, Norway on July 3, 1834. Olsen was the only son of Ole and Anne Jacobson. He graduated from Tromsø Seminary in 1854, and received a Bachelor of Arts degree from the University of Christiania.

Johan Olsen married Rakel Johanna Rodli on August 15, 1858. Together they had eleven children.

In 1866, Olsen immigrated to the United States. He moved to Paxton, Illinois, where he became a teacher at Augustana College. In 1867, Olsen was ordained, and became a pastor at Lutheran churches in Neenah and Fort Howard, Wisconsin. On April 19, 1867, Olsen began serving the Scandinavian Evangelical Lutheran Congregation in Denmark, Wisconsin.

In 1870, Olsen became the first vice-president of the Conference of the Norwegian-Danish Evangelical Lutheran Church of America. In 1872, he became the second president of the Conference serving until 1881. In 1873, Olsen moved to St. Ansgar, Iowa, and began serving First Lutheran Church. During this time, Olsen also served as vice-president and trustee of St. Olaf College in Northfield, Minnesota. In 1883, Olsen became the editor of the Norwegian Lutheran church newspaper, Lutheraneren of Mission-Blaldet.

Olsen died on September 11, 1911, and was buried in the cemetery of First Lutheran Church.
