= Marcus Olaus Bockman =

Lutheran theologian (1849–1942)

Marcus Olaus Bockman (January 9, 1849 – July 21, 1942) was a Norwegian-American Lutheran theologian.

== Background ==
Marcus Olaus Bockman was born Marcus Olaus Bøckmann at Langesund in Bamble Municipality in Telemark county, Norway. He was educated at Egersund High School, Aars and Voss Latin School, and the University of Christiania (Oslo). After graduating as a Candidatus theologiæ, he was ordained as a priest of the Church of Norway.

== Career ==
Bockman immigrated to the United States in 1875. He served as a Lutheran pastor near Kenyon, Minnesota at Gol Lutheran Church from 1875 to 1880 and at Moland Lutheran Church from 1880 to 1888. Having first worked as a Lutheran pastor for several years, he was appointed as a Professor of Theology at the Luther Theological Seminary operated by the Norwegian Synod in Saint Paul, Minnesota in 1886–90. He taught at Augsburg Seminary in Minneapolis, Minnesota from 1890 to 1893. He was President of the United Church Seminary operated by the United Norwegian Lutheran Church in Saint Paul, Minnesota from 1893–1917. He was made a Knight 1st class of the Royal Norwegian Order of St. Olav by King Haakon VII of Norway in 1912. His official portrait in the reading room of the library of Luther Theological Seminary depicts him wearing the Knight's Cross of the Order on his Norwegian clerical cassock.

From 1917 to 1930 he served as the president of the Luther Theological Seminary. From 1930 until his retirement in 1937, he continued to serve as a professor at the Seminary. He died in 1942 after suffering a broken hip. The personal records and files of Marcus O. Bockman are contained within the archives of Luther Seminary.
