= R. K. Harrison =

British-Canadian biblical scholar

Roland Kenneth Harrison
- Born: 4 August 1920
- Died: 2 May 1993 (aged 72)
- Occupation: Professor of Old Testament Studies
- Spouse: Kathleen (nee Beattie)
- Children: three

Academic background
- Education: University of London (PhD)
- Thesis: (1952)

Academic work
- Institutions: Clifton College; Huron College; Wycliffe College, Toronto
- Notable works: Introduction to the Old Testament (1969)

Roland Kenneth Harrison (4 August 1920 – 2 May 1993) was an Old Testament scholar.

== Background and career ==
Harrison studied at the University of London (B.D., 1943; M.Th., 1947, Ph.D., 1952) and taught at Clifton College, Bristol from 1947 to 1949, before his appointment as Hellmuth Professor of Old Testament Studies at Huron College, University of Western Ontario. In 1960 he became Professor of Old Testament Studies at Wycliffe College, University of Toronto, where he stayed until his retirement in 1986.

Harrison is best known for his Introduction to the Old Testament (1969) but wrote many other books, including commentaries on Leviticus (ISBN 184474258X) and Jeremiah and Lamentations (ISBN 0830842217). He was on the Executive Review Committee of the New King James Version. and translated several of the Minor Prophets in the New International Version. Together with Merrill Unger, he edited The New Unger’s Bible Dictionary.

In 1988, a Festschrift was published in his honour, Israel's apostasy and restoration: essays in honor of Roland K Harrison (ISBN 0801038308). Edited by Avraham Gileadi, it included contributions by Clarence Hassell Bullock, Eugene Merrill and Bruce Waltke.

Harrison married Kathleen Beattie in 1945, and they had three children.

Tremper Longman described him as "one of the most competent Old Testament evangelical scholars today."

== Works ==
=== Books ===
- Harrison, Roland Kenneth (1955). Biblical Hebrew (1st ed.). London: English Universities Press.
- ——— (1961). The Dead Sea Scrolls: an introduction. Harper Torchbooks, Cloister library (TB84). New York: Harper. OCLC 900218.
- ——— (1963). Archaeology of the Old Testament. Teach Yourself Books. London: English Universities Press. OCLC 4998618.
- ——— (1966). Healing Herbs of the Bible. Leiden: Brill. OCLC 1062180.
- ——— (1969). Introduction to the Old Testament: with a comprehensive review of Old Testament studies and a special supplement on the Apocrypha (1st ed.). Grand Rapids, MI: Eerdmans. ISBN 978-0-802-83107-1. OCLC 51934.
- ——— (1970). Old Testament Times (1st ed.). Grand Rapids, MI: Eerdmans. ISBN 978-0-802-83334-1. OCLC 80299.
- ——— (1973). Jeremiah and Lamentations: an introduction and commentary. Tyndale Old Testament Commentaries. Downers Grove, IL: Inter-Varsity Press. ISBN 978-0-851-11626-6. OCLC 700447.
- ——— (1974). Biblical Hebrew. Teach Yourself Books (Reprint ed.). London: Hodder and Stoughton. ISBN 978-0-340-05794-0. OCLC 5355422.
- ———; Waltke, Bruce K.; Guthrie, Donald; Fee, Gordon D. (1978). Biblical Criticism: historical, literary, and textual. Contemporary Evangelical Perspectives. Grand Rapids, MI: Zondervan. ISBN 9780310373513. OCLC 4194527.
- ——— (1980). Leviticus: an introduction and commentary. Tyndale Old Testament Commentaries. Downers Grove, IL: Inter-Varsity Press. ISBN 978-0-877-84253-8. OCLC 6708718.
- ———; Blaiklock, E. M., eds. (1983). The New International Dictionary of Biblical Archaeology. Regency Reference Library. Grand Rapids, MI: Zondervan. ISBN 978-0-310-21250-8. OCLC 8727822.
- ———, ed. (1985). Major Cities of the Biblical World. Nashville, TN: Thomas Nelson Publisher. ISBN 978-0-840-77520-7. OCLC 12050326.
- ———, ed. (1987). Encyclopedia of Biblical and Christian Ethics. Nashville, TN: Thomas Nelson Publisher. ISBN 978-0-840-74950-5. OCLC 13822457.
- ———, ed. (1988). The New Unger's Bible dictionary (by Merrill F. Unger) (3rd revision ed.). Chicago, IL: Moody Press. ISBN 978-0-802-49037-7. OCLC 18069861.
- ——— (1990). Numbers. Wycliffe Exegetical Commentary. Chicago, IL: Moody Press. ISBN 978-0-802-49261-6. OCLC 20454067.
- ———; Youngblood, Ronald F.; Bruce, F. F., eds. (1995). Nelson's New Illustrated Bible Dictionary. Nashville, TN: Thomas Nelson Publisher. ISBN 978--0-840-72071-9. OCLC 31607052.
- ——— (2005). Old Testament Times: a social, political, and cultural context (Revised & Colour Illustrated ed.). Grand Rapids, MI: Baker Books. ISBN 978-0-801-01286-0. OCLC 61315112.

=== Articles and chapters ===
- ——— (1951). "The Son of Man". The Evangelical Quarterly. 23 (1): 46–50. doi:10.1163/27725472-02301008.
- ——— (1953). "The Problem of Suffering and the Book of Job". The Evangelical Quarterly. 25 (1): 18–27.
- ——— (1954). "The Biblical Problem of Hyssop". The Evangelical Quarterly. 26 (4): 218–224. doi:10.1163/27725472-02604004.
- ——— (1956). "The Mandrake and the Ancient World". The Evangelical Quarterly. 28 (2): 87–92.

== Festschrift ==
- Gileadi, Avraham, ed. (1988). Israel's Apostasy and Restoration: essays in honor of Roland K. Harrison. Grand Rapids, MI: Baker Book House. ISBN 978-0-801-03830-3. OCLC 18289791.

== See also ==
- Olaf M. Norlie – whose Simplified New Testament was published along with Harrison's The Psalms for Today in the same binding
