= Red Wing Seminary =

Lutheran Church seminary in Red Wing, Minnesota

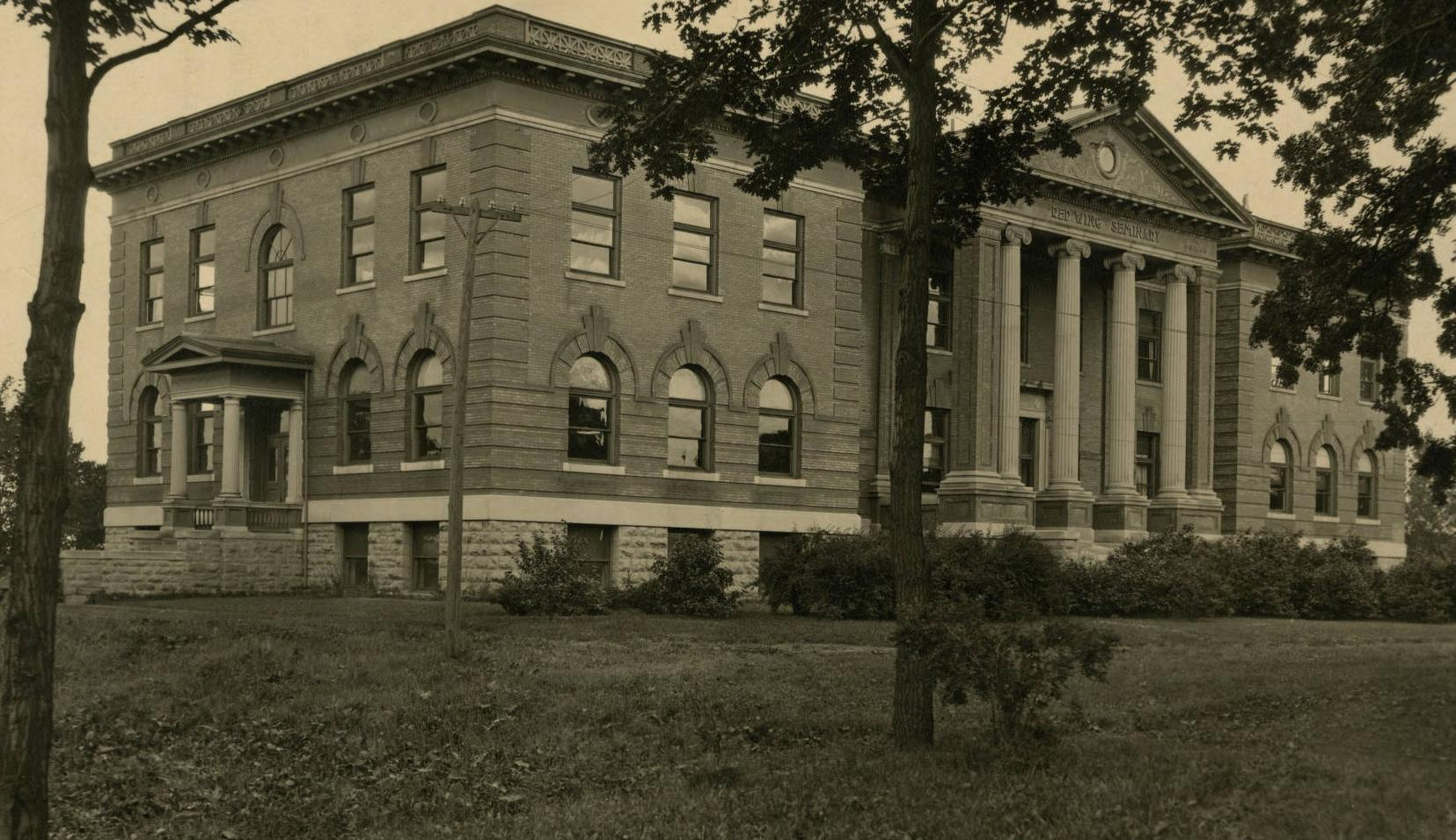
- Red Wing Seminary Main Hall in 1915
- Active: 1879–1932
- Religious affiliation: Hauge Synod (1879–1917); Norwegian Lutheran Church of America (1917–1932)
- Location: Redwing, Minnesota, United States; 44°33′28″N 92°32′27″W

Red Wing Seminary was a Lutheran Church seminary which operated from 1879 to 1932 in Red Wing, Minnesota, United States, with brick buildings on a bluff called College Hill overlooking the Mississippi River.

== History ==
Red Wing Seminary was the educational center for Hauge's Norwegian Evangelical Lutheran Synod in America, commonly known as the Hauge Synod. The synod de-emphasized formal worship and stressed personal faith in the Haugean tradition (haugianere). Red Wing Seminary opened in 1879 and was in operation until 1917. Notable alumni included John Rustgard, Bernt B. Haugan, Nils Nilsen Ronning, August Herman Andresen, and Knute Hill.

In 1917, the Norwegian Lutheran Church of America was formed by merger of the Hauge Synod, the Synod of the Norwegian Evangelical Lutheran Church in America (commonly called the Norwegian Synod), and the United Norwegian Lutheran Church of America. Each of the three churches operated a seminary, so the Norwegian Synod's Luther Seminary and the United Norwegian's United Church Seminary, both in Saint Paul, Minnesota, were merged with the Red Wing Seminary to form the Luther Theological Seminary on the site of the United Church Seminary.

Following the merger in 1917, the Red Wing facility initially continued as an academy and junior college of the Norwegian Lutheran Church of America. In 1932, those programs were merged into St. Olaf College in Northfield, Minnesota and the Red Wing campus was used for other purposes. None of the old seminary buildings remain standing.

== Additional sources ==
- Wolf, Edmund Scott (1889) The Lutherans in America; a story of struggle, progress, influence and marvelous growth (J.A. Hill. New York)
- Jarchow, Merrill E. (1973) Private Liberal Arts Colleges in Minnesota: Their History and Contributions (Minnesota Historical Society Press)
