= Ahlert Hysing =

Norwegian politician

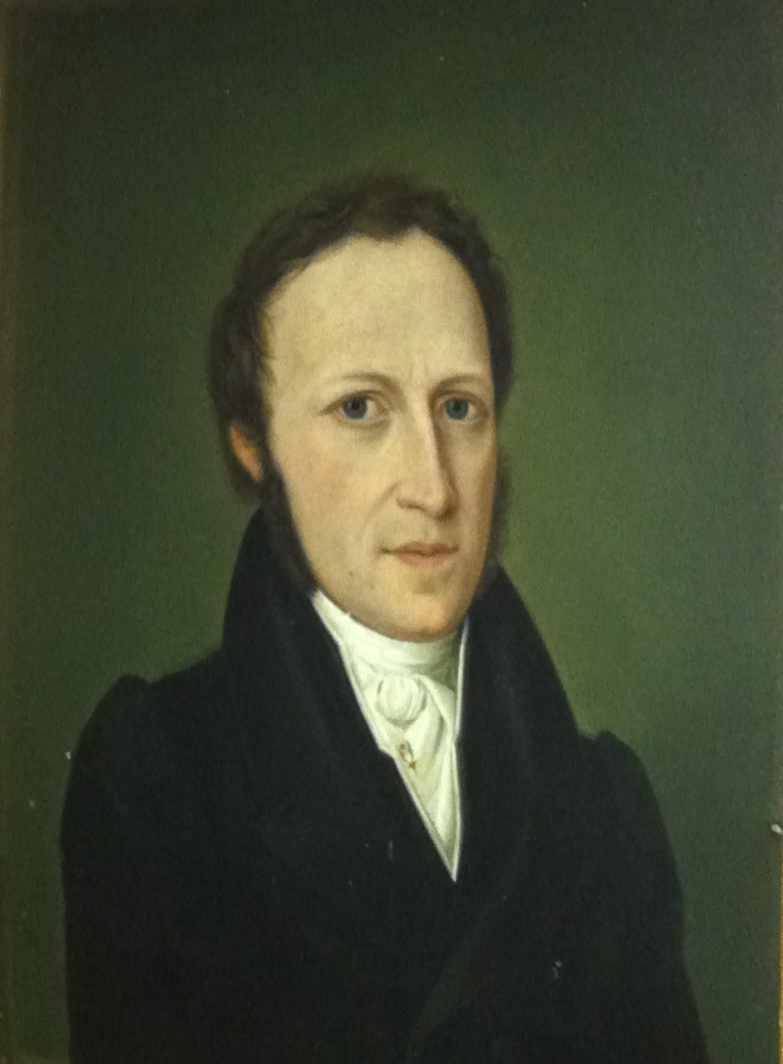
- Born: 5 September 1793
- Died: 9 November 1879 (aged 86)

Ahlert Hysing (5 September 1793 – 9 November 1879) was a Norwegian educator and member of the Parliament of Norway.

== Biography ==
Hysing was the son of Hans Augustinus Ahlertsen Hysing (1764–1843) and Maureen Elisabeth Nielsdatter Koren (1761–1808). His father served as parish priest of Holy Cross Church (Korskirken) in Bergen, Norway. Hysing worked as a schoolmaster at Bergen Cathedral School and later was appointed rector of the Laurvig Latin School (Laurvig middelskole) at Larvik in Vestfold, Norway.

Hysing was elected to the Norwegian Parliament in 1830, representing the constituency of Laurvik og Sandefjord in Vestfold. He sat through only one term.

In 1825, Hysing married Caroline Mathilde Koren (1801–1840) who was the daughter of author Christiane Koren. They had eight children, including Else Elisabeth Koren (1832–1918), who married Lutheran minister U. V. Koren (1826–1910). Else immigrated with her husband on his mission to Luther College in Decorah, Iowa.
