= U. V. Koren =

Ulrik Vilhelm Koren (December 22, 1826 – December 19, 1910) was a Norwegian-American author, theologian and church leader. A pioneer Lutheran minister, he played a significant role in the development of the spiritual and intellectual development of Norwegians in America. Ulrik Vilhelm Koren has been called the "patriarch of Norwegian American Lutherans."

== Biography ==
Ulrik Vilhelm Koren was born in Bergen, Norway. Although the family home was at Bergen, the family also spent much time at Selja, at the home of Koren's paternal uncle, Laurentius Koren. Selja, which was formerly known as Selø, is a small island in the county of Sogn og Fjordane, Norway. Koren lived there after the death of his father, Paul S. S. Koren, a sea captain, in an earthquake in Haiti in 1842. Koren was an 1852 theology graduate from the Royal Frederick University.

Koren was called to the United States to serve the Little Iowa Congregation (later called Washington Prairie) in Winneshiek County, Iowa. He was the first Lutheran minister from Norway to settle west of the Mississippi. Koren's pastorate included large parts of Northeastern Iowa and Southern Minnesota. Many of the Lutheran congregations within that area look to Pastor Koren as their founder. Koren played an active part in the Synod of the Norwegian Evangelical Lutheran Church in America. Koren served as vice president of the Synod of the Norwegian Evangelical Lutheran Church in America (1871-1876) and was president of the Synod's Iowa District (1876- 1894). He was president of the synod from 1894 until his death in 1910.

During his ministry, Koren wrote numerous publications addressing various issues of concern to the Lutheran religious community. His leadership ensured that Luther College moved to Decorah, Iowa in 1862 after an initial year in Wisconsin. Koren was also instrumental in purchasing the land and locating Luther College. In 1903, he was awarded a Doctor of Divinity degree from Concordia Theological Seminary. He was made a Commander of the Royal Norwegian Order of St. Olav by the King of Norway. Rev. Koren died on December 19, 1910, and was buried in the cemetery of Washington Prairie Lutheran Church, Decorah, Iowa.

== Else Elisabeth Koren ==
In 1853 Koren married Else Elisabeth Hysing. Else's father, Ahlert Hysing, had been rector of the Latin School at Larvik which Koren had attended. Elisabeth was born on May 24, 1832, in Larvik. Vilhelm Koren knew half a dozen languages, and Elisabeth read Danish, Norwegian, German, and English. She was the author of The Diary of Elisabeth Koren, 1853-1855. The autobiography was translated into English and published in 1955. It provides detailed insight into what it was like for four adults and two children to spend the winter in a one-room 14-by-16-foot log house. In time, the Korens had nine children. Elisabeth Koren died on June 7, 1918, at Washington Prairie, in Winneshiek County, Iowa.

== Egge-Koren House ==
From December 1853 to March 1854, the newlyweds, Rev. U. V. Koren and his wife Elisabeth, lived with the Egge family near Decorah, Iowa. The house in which they lived during that period is now known as the Egge-Koren House and is on exhibit at the Vesterheim Norwegian-American Museum.

== Koren Building ==
The Koren Building at Luther College dedicated in 1921, was named in honor of Ulrik Vilhelm Koren who was one of the founders and leaders of Luther College. The building housed the Koren Library until 1969. Major renovation was undertaken in 1987–88, and the building is now devoted to classrooms and faculty offices for members of the Education, History, Politics, Sociology, and Anthropology/Archeology Departments.

== Selected bibliography ==
- The Right Principles of Church Government (Bethany Lutheran Theological Seminary. Reprinted 1981)
- Why Is There No Church Unity Among Norwegian Lutherans In America? (Bethany Lutheran Theological Seminary. Reprinted 1981)
- Our Age Is A Period Of Transition (Bethany Lutheran Theological Seminary. Reprinted 1981)

== Additional Sources ==
- Norlie, O.M. Norsk Lutherske Menigheter i Amerika, 1843 - 1916 (Minneapolis, Augsburg Publishing house, 1918) Norwegian
- Preus, Herman A. Ulrik Vilhelm Koren: A Biography (Bethany Lutheran Seminary. Mankato, Mn. 1950)
- Koren, Elizabeth The Diary of Elisabeth Koren, 1853-1855 (New York : Arno Press, 1979, ©1955)
- Johnson, James H. History of The Norwegian Community of Chickasaw County Iowa (The Chickasaw County Iowa Genealogical Society. June 2001)
