= Oren Cornelius Gregg =

American farmer and educator (1845–1926)

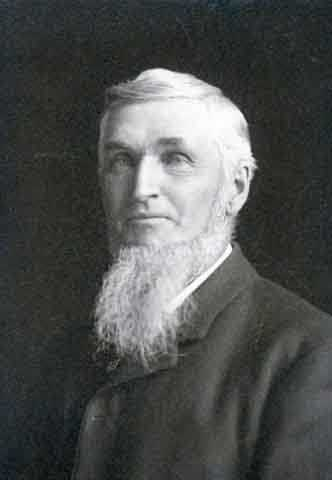
Gregg c. 1905

Oren Cornelius Gregg (November 2, 1845 – February 2, 1926) was a farmer and educator from Minnesota. In the 1880s, agricultural education in Minnesota was in trouble: farmers would not travel to the Twin Cities for classes, and university students did not want to study farming. Gregg, a successful dairy farmer from Lyon County, saved the day by bringing lectures directly to farmers. Beginning in 1885, he led the Minnesota Farmers' Institute, a public lecture series that became the agricultural extension service at the University of Minnesota. Through the institutes that he held across the state, Gregg encouraged farmers to diversify their crops and taught them how to make dairy farming more efficient.

== Early life ==
Gregg was born in Enosburgh, Vermont in 1845. His father was a traveling minister, and his grandfather ran a highly regarded dairy farm. Gregg worked as a clerk, a schoolteacher, and a lay minister as a young man, before he settled on a homestead in Lyon County, Minnesota, in 1870. He and his wife, Charlotte, named the homestead Coteau Farm. They went into dairy farming, hoping to avoid problems such as soil depletion that can come with growing a single cash crop.

At Coteau Farm, Gregg pioneered winter dairying. Minnesota dairy farmers had been at a disadvantage because of the state's climate. Without nutritious grass in the winter, cows stopped producing milk. Using knowledge from his grandfather, Gregg experimented to make winter dairying possible. He bred cows specifically for dairy, rather than beef, and he used a combination of grain, corn, and hay to keep his cows producing milk during the winter. Gregg and his wife developed high-quality butter known as "Solid Gold" that consistently won top prizes at local fairs.

Gregg's success drew attention, and farmers began to visit Coteau Farm to learn about his methods. In the early 1880s, he was asked to begin speaking about his methods at dairy conventions and county fairs.

At the same time, the agricultural education programs at the University of Minnesota were drawing fierce criticism. As a land-grant university, the school was required to teach agriculture. The Farmers' Alliance in Minnesota alleged that land grant funds were being misused and demanded a separate agricultural college. Other farmer organizations, like The National Grange of the Order of Patrons of Husbandry (the Grange), were less militant but supported the position held by the Farmers' Alliance.

In response, in 1885 University Regent and former Minnesota Governor John S. Pillsbury and Professor Edward D. Porter asked Gregg for help. Gregg proposed a series of lectures that would travel to farmers, rather than asking farmers to travel to the Twin Cities. The university's Board of Regents liked the idea.

== Minnesota Farmers' Institute ==
Gregg was chosen to oversee the Minnesota Farmers' Institute lecture series in 1886. He held thirty-one institutes that year, speaking and hiring speakers. His first institutes were met with mixed reactions. In some towns, they had good attendance. In other towns, their attendance was low, farmers were hostile, or the lectures were actively boycotted.

During the next few years, however, the institutes became more successful. In 1887, the Farmers' Institute secured state funding and Gregg was officially named superintendent. To draw crowds, Gregg asked his lecturers to speak off the cuff and to use demonstrations to create a spectacle. Some lectures drew crowds of up to 500 people. By 1899, even the Grange was an enthusiastic supporter of the institutes.

Gregg chose lecturers who had practical farming experience, rather than "book farmers." The institutes' main subjects were Gregg's own interests: crop diversification and winter dairying. Speakers also lectured on hog farming, sheep husbandry, and horse training. In 1890, Gregg added cooking institutes for farmers' wives.

In the early 1900s, Gregg's institutes came under criticism once again. In the early years, his focus on practical farming skills rather than agricultural science was seen as a virtue. But after twenty years, many felt that farmers needed more advanced lessons. Further, there were many agricultural scientists at the University of Minnesota whose expertise was not being used.

In 1907, the university's Board of Regents demanded that Gregg make changes to respond to these criticisms. Gregg refused and turned down another term as superintendent. He was replaced by Archie D. Wilson, who relied more on local speakers and agricultural scientists.

== Later life ==
For the next seven years, Gregg lectured on agricultural topics in other states including North Dakota and Montana. He returned to Coteau Farm in 1914. In 1917, Gregg's friends in the state legislature secured a pension for him based on his early agricultural extension work. Gregg died in 1926.
