= Thomas R. Ahlersmeyer =

Lutheran minister (born 1954)

Thomas R. Ahlersmeyer (born April 23, 1954) is a Lutheran educator and minister with the Lutheran Church – Missouri Synod in the United States. From 2005 to 2009, he was the president of Concordia University in Ann Arbor, Michigan, and was previously interim president. He presently serves as senior pastor of Holy Cross Lutheran Church and School in Fort Wayne, Indiana. Before serving in Ann Arbor, Ahlersmeyer was the executive director of the Cleveland Lutheran High Schools.
