= Argo, Nebraska =

- Ghost Town
- Location within Nebraska
- Coordinates: 41°43′25″N 96°26′39″W
- Country: United States
- State: Nebraska
- County: Burt

Argo is an extinct town in Burt County, Nebraska, United States.

== History ==
A post office was established at Argo in 1878, and remained in operation until it was discontinued in 1904. The community was named after the mythological ship Argo.
