= Bernt B. Haugan =

American Lutheran minister, politician and temperance leader

- Born: September 17, 1862; Skogn Municipality, Norway
- Died: December 5, 1931 (aged 69); United States
- Occupations: Lutheran minister and politician

Bernt B. Haugan (September 17, 1862 – December 5, 1931) was an American Lutheran minister, politician, and temperance leader.

== Biography ==
Bernt Benjaminsen Haugan was born at Haugan Vestre in Skogn Municipality in what is now Levanger Municipality in Nordre Trondheim county, Norway, on September 17, 1862. He and his parents and siblings left for America on April 3, 1872. He attended Red Wing Seminary in Red Wing, Minnesota, the educational center and preparatory school of the Hauge Synod of the Evangelical Lutheran Church in America.

Haugan was ordained a Lutheran minister and served out his pastorate within the Hauge Synod. Members of the Hauge Synod were a group of Norwegian-American Lutherans who followed the principles of revivalist Norwegian lay preacher Hans Nielsen Hauge.

In 1900, Haugan ran for the office of Governor of Minnesota as a candidate for the Prohibition Party. From 1904 to 1907, Haugan was co-owner and publisher of the Norwegian language newspaper Vot tid which was published in Minneapolis.

Haugan wrote and published several Norwegian language prayer books. His most notable work was a hymnal entitled Vaegterrøsten. Musik til Sange i Vaeteren og andre gode Sange published in Chicago during 1887. Haugan also compiled Folkesange - Songs for All Occasions- Religious Patriotic and Lyric, a compilation of English-language and Norwegian-language songs of religion, patriotic, and popular folksongs of the era. Additionally Haugan published a volume of temperance songs in a book entitled Kamp melodier ('Battle Melodies').

Haugan died on December 5, 1931, and was buried at Valley View Cemetery in Everett, Washington.

== Selected works ==
- Et Beføg hos Presten ("A Visit to the Minister". Faribault, Minn: O.A. Östby. 1895)
- Over land og Bolge, Reiseskildringer fra Orienten og de Europeiske lande ("Over Land and Billow: Travel Narratives from the Orient and Europe". Minneapolis, Minn: Ungdommens Ven. 1897)
- De Syv Djævle ("The Seven Demons". Chicago, Illinois: Fremad. 1901)
