= United Evangelical Lutheran Church =

Protestant denomination

- Abbreviation: United Church
- Classification: Lutheran
- Region: United States
- Origin: 1896; Minneapolis, Minnesota
- Merger of: Danish Evangelical Lutheran Church Association in America and Danish Evangelical Lutheran Church in North America
- Merged into: The American Lutheran Church (1960)
- Congregations: 164 (1959)
- Members: 66,623 (1959)
- Ministers: 197 (1959)
- Other name(s): United Danish Evangelical Lutheran Church (1896–1946)

The United Evangelical Lutheran Church (commonly known as the United Church) was one of the many denominations formed when Lutherans came to the United States from Europe. Originally known as the United Danish Evangelical Lutheran Church, the United Church merged with other Lutheran groups to form the American Lutheran Church in 1960, which endured until 1988.

== History ==
The Danish Evangelical Lutheran Church Association in America (or Blair Church) was formed in 1884 by a group of Danish members who left the Conference of the Norwegian-Danish Evangelical Lutheran Church of America. Many of Blair Church pastors were supportive of the Inner Mission. The Blair Church was based in Blair, Nebraska.

The Danish Evangelical Lutheran Church in North America (or North Church) was formed in 1894 when seminary president Kristian Anker and professor Peter Sørensen Vig, along with a number of pastor and congregations, left the Danish Evangelical Lutheran Church in America over theological differences. These two churches merged in 1896 in Minneapolis, Minnesota, to form the United Danish Evangelical Lutheran Church (in addition to being known as the United Church, this new church continued to be referred to as the "Blair Church").

The United Church quickly formed a system of education, centered in Blair, Nebraska. The center-piece was Trinity Seminary, an institution designed for the training of pastors. Trinity was supported by the Dana School. The Dana School was originally intended to provide future pastors with a pre-seminary education, and others in the community with a secondary education. The school eventually became a two-year college, and then a four-year college, now known as Dana College.

In 1946, as the second and third generation of Danes in America started to merge into the American culture, the word "Danish" was dropped from the official name of the church. In 1960, the United Church merged with churches that were ethnically German and Norwegian to form the American Lutheran Church. In 1959, just before its merger into the ALC, the United Church had 197 pastors, 164 congregations, and 66,623 members.

In 1988, the American Lutheran Church became a part of the largest Lutheran denomination in America, the Evangelical Lutheran Church in America. As a result of the merger, Trinity Seminary closed its doors, becoming a part of Wartburg Theological Seminary. Dana College in Blair continued to be a college of the ELCA until its closure in 2010.

== Theology ==
In the 19th century, the Lutherans in Denmark were divided into three different camps. Many in the church followed the ideas of the theologian and hymn writer N. F. S. Grundtvig. Another group, known as Inner Mission, was strongly influenced by European Pietism. This group was so opposed to the ideas of Grundtvig that they were often referred to as the "Anti-Grundtvigians". Finally, a third group known as the Centerists attempted to keep the church together by incorporating ideas from both groups.

The United Church fell firmly in the Inner Mission or Anti-Grundtvigian camp. There was a strong emphasis on personal holiness in the United Church, and not much talk about the sacraments. This emphasis led to the United Church being known as the "sad Danes" or "holy Danes". While other Danish Lutherans in America tended to prefer pastors and leaders trained in Copenhagen, the United Church more quickly moved toward pastors trained in America in order to avoid the influence of Grundtvigian theology.

== Presidents ==
- G. B. Christiansen (1896–1921)
- M. N. Andreasen (1921–1925)
- N. C. Carlsen (1925–1950)
- Hans C. Jersild (1950–1956)
- William Larsen (1956–1960)

== See also ==
- American Evangelical Lutheran Church, the other Danish-American Lutheran church body
