= Judith Hird =

Judith Hird-Boal (born c. 1946) was ordained as the pastor of the Holy Cross Lutheran Church in Toms River, New Jersey, on June 20, 1972. This made her the first woman pastor of a Lutheran church.
