= Eielsen Synod =

- Classification: Lutheran
- Region: United States
- Founder: Elling Eielsen
- Origin: 1846; Jefferson Prairie Settlement, Wisconsin
- Separations: Hauge Synod (1876)
- Other name(s): Evangelical Lutheran Church in America

The Eielsen Synod (originally named the Evangelical Lutheran Church in America) was a Lutheran church body. It was founded in 1846 at Jefferson Prairie Settlement, Wisconsin, by a group of Haugean Lutherans led by Elling Eielsen, the first Norwegian Lutheran minister in the United States.

== Background ==
There were church splits in 1848 and 1856. In 1876, the synod numbered 24 pastors, 59 congregations, and 7,500 members. That year a major split occurred and many of the clergymen and congregations left the Eielsen Synod and organized the Hauge Synod. Elling Eielsen and his supporters continued the synod under the 1846 church constitution in Jackson, Minnesota.

The Eielsen Synod emphasized the importance of repentance, conversion, and lay preaching. It opposed ritualism, formal worship, clerical vestments, and clerical authority. The Eielsen Synod had 1,500 members in ten churches in 1953. By 1971, it had declined to 75 members scattered among churches in French Lake and Jackson, Minnesota; Centerville, South Dakota; and Taylor and Lodi, Wisconsin.

In 1985, there were approximately 50 members at just three churches: Stall Norwegian Church in Jackson, Minnesota; Bethania Lutheran in Lodi/Eau Claire, Wisconsin; and Immanuel in French Lake, Minnesota. Immanuel is now an independent Lutheran church and Stall Norwegian has closed. A minister was ordained on May 10, 2008 by the presiding president of Bethania ELCA-Eielson Church. Martin Leroy Bystol was the active president of such ministry of the Eielsen Synod until his death. Rev Orvin L. Bystol is an ordained minister and resides in Eau Claire, where the church is located.

== See also ==
- The Norwegian Lutheran Church in the United States

== Other sources ==
- Preus Jr., J. A. O. Protesting Norwegians (America's Lutherans. Ed. Omar Bonderud and Charles Lutz Columbus OH: Wartburg Press 1958)
