= Olaf M. Norlie =

American pastor and scholar (1876–1962)

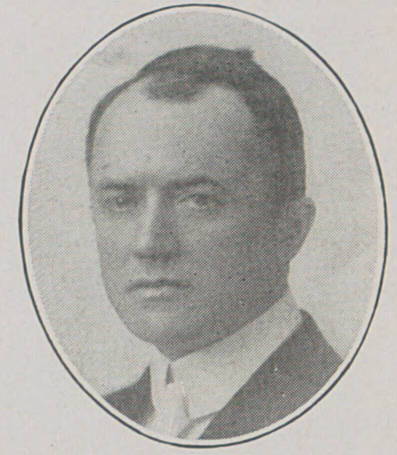
Olaf M. Norlie

Olaf Morgan Norlie (January 11, 1876 – June 22, 1962), also referred to as O. M. Norlie, was a Lutheran minister, educator and scholar. He was additionally a Lutheran church historian, librarian, editor and statistician. He was also a prolific author who is most remembered as the translator of the Simplified New Testament.

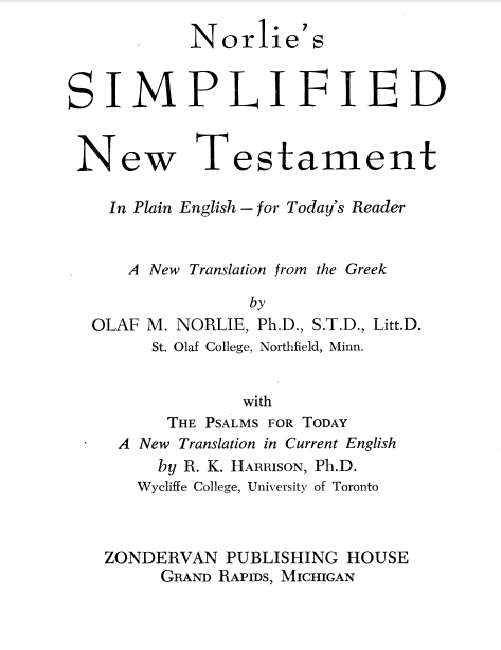
Title page of Norlie's Simplified New Testament

== Background ==
Norlie was born to Norwegian immigrant parents in Sioux City, Iowa. In 1866, his father had emigrated from Fåberg Municipality in Oppland county, Norway. Norlie went on to graduate from St. Olaf College in 1898, completed his master's degree at the University of Wisconsin in 1901, then earned his doctorate at the University of Minnesota in 1908. His dissertation was titled The Principles of Expressive Reading, a Study of the Human Voice. He also attended the Norwegian Lutheran United Church Seminary.

== Ministry ==
He served as a pastor in the United Norwegian Lutheran Church of America in Minnesota for 8 years. Then he went into teaching, first teaching Greek and psychology at Luther College in Decorah, Iowa. He then went on to serve as Dean and professor of Religion at Hartwick College and Seminary. He went on to serve as librarian at St. Olaf College until his retirement. The library at St. Olaf has archival materials from his life and a large collection of his writings.

Norlie served as a member of the publishing committee for the Augsburg Publishing House in Minneapolis and for 20 years he was editor of the Lutheran World Almanac. He was a member of the American Philological Association and a poet. Due to his interest in statistics, in 1932 he was elected as a member of the American Mathematical Society.

== Works ==
In addition to the books he wrote by himself, he was also editor and/or translator for a number of other volumes. Norlie wrote dozens of articles, both religious and secular. For example, a list of his writings for 1935 alone includes over 30 articles and scholarly book reviews, many in the Norwegian language. For Norske lutherske menigheter i Amerika, Norlie and his staff collected information concerning thousands of Lutheran congregations and ministries throughout the United States and Canada, includes sections on each synod.

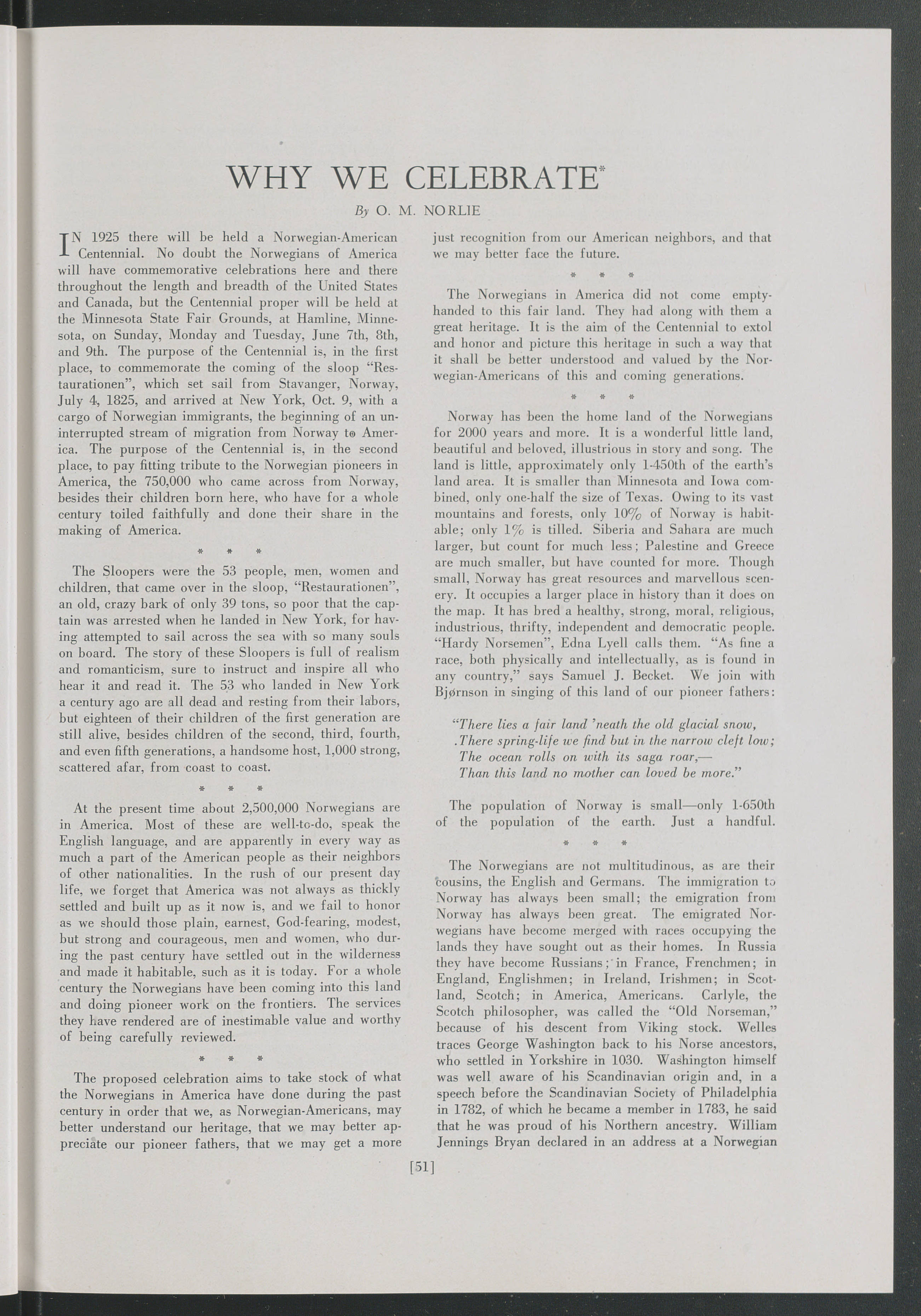
Olaf Norlie wrote an essay titled "Why We Celebrate" for the 1925 Norse American Centennial.

Today Norlie's best known work is his translation of the New Testament titled Simplified New Testament. He originally had John's Gospel published in 1943 as The Gospel of St. John: translated into modern English (published in Texas). Though he completed the entire New Testament in 1951, he could not initially find a publisher to print it. Finally in 1961, Zondervan published it. It was so positively received that there was a second printing in that same year. It was bound together with The Psalms For Today A New Translation in Current English, translated by R. K. Harrison. The following is a sample from his Simplified New Testament, Romans 1:21-23:

"And although men knew that God exists, yet they did not acknowledge Him as such, nor did they give Him thanks. Rather, they busied themselves with silly speculations about Him, and their stupid minds groped about in the dark. To be sure, they claimed to be wise, but they were fools. So they exchanged the glory of the incorruptible God for images in the likeness of corruptible man, and of birds, four-footed beasts and reptiles."

== Selected bibliography ==
- A Guide to Literary Study (1901)
- A guide to literary study : for the teacher, student, and general reader (1901)
- United Church Home Mission (1909)
- Ness Jubelskrift (1911)
- Den forenede norsk lutherske kirke i Amerika (1914)
- The Academy for Princes (1917)
- Principles of expressive reading, impression before expression (1918)
- Norsk Lutherske Menigheter i Amerika (1918)
- Christian Keyser Preus, 1852-1921 with Oscar Adolf Tingelstad (1922)
- An elementary Christian psychology (1924)
- History of the Norwegian People in America (1925)
- The outlined Bible, for the preacher, Bible student, Sunday school teacher, and lay reader (1928)
- Elling Eielsen, a Brief History, Written for the Elling Eielsen Centennial (1940)
- Prominent Personalities: WCAL Radio Talks (1942)
- Norwegian-American Papers (1847-1946) (1946)
- Eielsen Was First; a Bibliography (1942)
- Lars Lillehei (1944)
- He Made Good; a Centennial Sketch of Ole Halvorson Norlie, 1845-1896, A Norwegian-American Pioneer (1945)
- Ho ga te me (She Gave to Me); a Centennial Sketch of Martha Karolina (Juel) Norlie, 1846-1918, a Norwegian-American Pioneer - a biography of his mother (1946)
- Norlie-Bonhus family tree (1949)
- Poems to people (1953)
- Names of Jesus in the Bible, stated and implied (1955)
- Psychology of sin (1956)
- Creeds or chaos (1956)
- It pays to go to school; seen in attendance statistics at Norwegian-American higher schools (1956)
- Six generations of Gunder A. Bonhus (1958)

== Other sources ==
- Hamre, James S. 1985. Three Spokesmen for Norwegian Lutheran Academies: Schools for Church, Heritage, Society. (Norwegian-American Studies, Volume 30: 221-246).
- Hamre, James S. 1985. The views of Herman Amberg Preus (1825-1894), D. G. Ristad (1863-1938), and Olaf M. Norlie (1876-1962). (Norwegian-American Studies, Volume 31).
