= Roscoe Township, Goodhue County, Minnesota =

Roscoe Township, Minnesota
- Township
- Location within the state of Minnesota Roscoe Township, Minnesota (the United States)
- Coordinates: 44°14′34″N 92°43′25″W
- Country: United States
- State: Minnesota
- County: Goodhue

Area
  - Total: 35.8 sq mi (92.6 km^{2})
  - Land: 35.8 sq mi (92.6 km^{2})
  - Water: 0 sq mi (0.0 km^{2})
- Elevation: 1,191 ft (363 m)

Population (2000)
  - Total: 784
  - Density: 22/sq mi (8.5/km^{2})
- Time zone: UTC-6 (Central (CST))
  - Summer (DST): UTC-5 (CDT)
- FIPS code: 27-55492
- GNIS feature ID: 0665457

Roscoe Township is a township in Goodhue County, Minnesota, United States. The population was 784 at the 2000 census.

At its high point, the township had a convenience store, school and more. Today - little is left to identify it other than a group of houses on the corner of Cty 27 blvd. and Cty 11 blvd.

Roscoe Township was organized in 1858, and named after Roscoe, Illinois, the hometown of an early settler.

== Geography ==
According to the United States Census Bureau, the township has a total area of 35.8 square miles (92.6 km^{2}), of which 35.8 square miles (92.6 km^{2}) is land and 0.03% is water.

== Demographics ==
As of the census of 2000, there were 784 people, 258 households, and 222 families residing in the township. The population density was 21.9 people per square mile (8.5/km^{2}). There were 265 housing units at an average density of 7.4/sq mi (2.9/km^{2}). The racial makeup of the township was 99.36% White, 0.26% African American, 0.13% Native American and 0.26% Asian.

There were 258 households, out of which 44.6% had children under the age of 18 living with them, 80.2% were married couples living together, 2.3% had a female householder with no husband present, and 13.6% were non-families. 11.2% of all households were made up of individuals, and 3.5% had someone living alone who was 65 years of age or older. The average household size was 3.04 and the average family size was 3.30.

In the township the population was spread out, with 31.8% under the age of 18, 6.8% from 18 to 24, 28.1% from 25 to 44, 25.1% from 45 to 64, and 8.3% who were 65 years of age or older. The median age was 37 years. For every 100 females, there were 114.8 males. For every 100 females age 18 and over, there were 105.0 males.

The median income for a household in the township was $56,719, and the median income for a family was $59,167. Males had a median income of $35,909 versus $25,469 for females. The per capita income for the township was $20,472. About 2.6% of families and 3.1% of the population were below the poverty line, including 3.5% of those under age 18 and 3.0% of those age 65 or over.
