= Roland Weisselberg =

German vicar (1933–2006)

Roland Weisselberg (Roland Weißelberg) (4 July 1933 – 1 November 2006) was a Lutheran Vicar who received public attention by his self-immolation in a German monastery.

Weisselberg was born in Königsberg, East Prussia. A critic of the rulers of the German Democratic Republic, he retired in 1989 because of his state of health. After the German reunification he was worried about the weakness of Christianity in East Germany and about Islam, whose rise was, as he believed, furthered by the "ambiguity of the church". Shortly before his death he sent a letter to a newspaper, in which he advocated the dropping of the performances of the opera Idomeneo at the Deutsche Oper Berlin, claiming that its featuring of the severed heads of Jesus and Muhammad is a vilification of Christianity and Islam.

Weisselberg poured petrol over himself and set fire to himself at St. Augustine's Monastery, Erfurt (where Martin Luther took his monastic vows in 1505), shouting repeatedly "Jesus" and "Oskar" (referring to Oskar Brüsewitz, another priest who had also immolated himself). Despite efforts by many on the scene who rushed to extinguish the flames, Weisselberg later died of his injuries. In a farewell he stated the reason of this action being a "schleichende Islamisierung" (creeping Islamization) of Germany. Since his widow Ingelore Weisselberg never allowed the farewell letter to be published, his true intentions remain unclear.

== See also ==
- 2006 Idomeneo controversy
