= Synod of the Norwegian Evangelical Lutheran Church in America =

Defunct Christian denomination in the United States

- Abbreviation: Norwegian Synod
- Classification: Lutheran
- Region: United States
- Origin: February 1853; Koshkonong and Luther Valley, Wisconsin
- Separations: Anti-Missourian Brotherhood (1880s); Evangelical Lutheran Synod (1917)
- Merged into: Norwegian Lutheran Church of America (1917)

The Synod of the Norwegian Evangelical Lutheran Church in America, commonly called the Norwegian Synod, was founded in 1853. It included churches in Illinois, Iowa, Minnesota, and Wisconsin.

== History ==
In February 1853, several Lutheran ministers including Claus Lauritz Clausen, Hans Andreas Stub, Adolph Carl Preus, Herman Amberg Preus, G. F. Dietrichson, Jacob Aall Ottesen, and R. D. Brandt organized the Norwegian Evangelical Lutheran Church in America, commonly known as the Norwegian Synod. It was organized at Koshkonong and Luther Valley near the Jefferson Prairie Settlement outside Madison, Wisconsin. Among the first denominational leaders was Ulrik Vilhelm Koren. The synod adopted the ritual of the Church of Norway. In 1868 the name was changed to the Synod for the Norwegian Evangelical Lutheran Church in America.

In the early years Norwegian Synod seminary students were sent to Concordia Seminary in St. Louis, Missouri. Luther College was founded near La Crosse, Wisconsin, in 1861, and relocated to Decorah, Iowa, the next year. Peter Laurentius Larsen served as president of Luther College from 1861 until he resigned from the presidency in 1902.

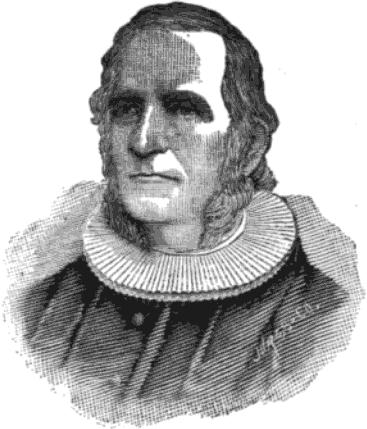
Herman Amberg Preus, (1825 – 1894), a key figure in organizing the Norwegian Synod

In 1876, the denomination established Luther Seminary in Madison, Wisconsin, (later moved to St. Paul). Desiring unity and cooperation with fellow Lutherans, in 1872 the Norwegian Synod was a co-founder of the Evangelical Lutheran Synodical Conference of North America along with the Missouri, Wisconsin, and Ohio synods. However, the Norwegian Synod soon experienced internal division over questions concerning predestination and conversion, and during the 1880s about a third of its congregations left. These dissenting "Anti-Missourian Brotherhood" congregations joined in 1890 with the Norwegian Augustana Synod and the Norwegian-Danish Conference to form the United Norwegian Lutheran Church of America (Norwegian:Den Forenede Kirke).

Further attempts at Lutheran unity continued into the early 20th century. The 1912 Madison Settlement (Norwegian: Madison Opgjør), agreed upon by representatives of the Hauge Synod, the United Church, and the Norwegian Synod, called for doctrinal discussions and compromises to take place so that Norwegian Lutherans could unite into a single jurisdiction. The result was the Austin Agreement of 1916, and on June 9, 1917, the United Church, the Hauge Synod, and the Norwegian Synod merged to become the Norwegian Lutheran Church of America. In 1946, that body changed its name to the Evangelical Lutheran Church. Through a series of mergers, it became part of the American Lutheran Church in 1960, and currently the Evangelical Lutheran Church in America (ELCA).

After the merger of 1917, a small group who chose not to join the merger for doctrinal reasons, reorganized as the Norwegian Synod of the American Evangelical Lutheran Church (sometimes referred to as the "Little Norwegian Synod"). This group committed itself “to continue in the old doctrine and practice of the Norwegian Synod". In 1957, it changed its name to become the Evangelical Lutheran Synod.

== Presidents ==
- Adolph Carl Preus, 1853–1862
- Herman Amberg Preus, 1862–1894
- Ulrik Vilhelm Koren, 1894–1910
- Hans Gerhard Stub, 1910–1917

== See also ==
- Norwegian-American Lutheranism

== Other sources ==
- Aaberg, Theodore Arne. A City Set on the Hill, A History of the Evangelical Lutheran Synod (Norwegian Synod) 1918-1968.
- Nichol, Todd W. All These Lutherans (Minneapolis, MN: Augburg Publishing House, 1986)
- Nelson, E. Clifford, and Fevold, Eugene L. The Lutheran Church among Norwegian-Americans: a history of the Evangelical Lutheran Church (Minneapolis: Augsburg Publishing House, 1960)
- Wolf, Edmund Jacob. The Lutherans in America; a story of struggle, progress, influence and marvelous growth.( New York: J.A. Hill. 1889)
