= Conference of the Norwegian-Danish Evangelical Lutheran Church of America =

Defunct Christian denomination in the United States

- Abbreviation: The Conference
- Classification: Lutheran
- Region: United States
- Origin: 1870
- Separated from: Scandinavian Evangelical Lutheran Augustana Synod in North America
- Separations: Danish Evangelical Lutheran Church Association in America (1884)
- Merged into: United Norwegian Lutheran Church of America (1890)

Conference of the Norwegian-Danish Evangelical Lutheran Church of America usually called the Conference was a Lutheran church body that existed in the United States from 1870 to 1890, when it merged into the United Norwegian Lutheran Church of America.

The church had split from the Scandinavian Evangelical Lutheran Augustana Synod in North America (SAS) in 1870. Prior to the split the SAS had placed a Norwegian seminary in Marshall, Wisconsin, which today is located in Minneapolis, Minnesota, and known as Augsburg University.

When the Conference separated from the SAS in 1870, another church body also split from the SAS, the Norwegian-Danish Augustana Synod in America (NAS). The difference between the NAS and the Conference was the inclusion of the Book of Concord. The NAS wanted to include the entire Book of Concord as the confessional base. The Conference wanted to use only the three ecumenical creeds, Luther's Small Catechism, and the Unaltered Augsburg Confession.

The two groups along with the Anti-Missourian Brotherhood group from the Norwegian Synod united in 1890 to form the United Norwegian Lutheran Church of America.

In 1884, a group of Danish members left the Conference and formed the Danish Evangelical Lutheran Church Association in America also known as the Danish Association and "the Blair Church".

== Presidents of the Conference ==
- 1870-1872 Claus Lauritz Clausen
- 1872-1881 Johan Olsen
- 1881-1886 Theodor H. Dahl
- 1886-1890 Gjermund Hoyme
