= United Norwegian Lutheran Church of America =

Defunct Christian denomination in the United States

The United Norwegian Lutheran Church of America (UNLC) was the result of the union in 1890 of the Norwegian Augustana Synod (established 1870), the Conference of the Norwegian-Danish Evangelical Lutheran Church of America (established 1870), and the Anti-Missourian Brotherhood (established 1887). Some sources give the church's name as "in America" instead of "of America",

In 1897, a group of congregations left the UNLC and formed the Lutheran Free Church. In 1900, another group of congregations left to form the Church of the Lutheran Brethren of America.

The UNLC merged in 1917 with two other Norwegian-American synods, the Hauge Synod (est. 1876) and the Norwegian Synod (1853), to form the Norwegian Lutheran Church of America, whose name was later changed to the Evangelical Lutheran Church. That body later merged into the American Lutheran Church, which itself became part of the Evangelical Lutheran Church in America. Marcus Olaus Bockman was president of the United Church Seminary in Saint Paul, Minnesota, which was operated by the UNLC until the 1917 merger.

== Presidents ==
- Gjermund Hoyme 1890–1902
- Theodor H. Dahl 1902–1917
