= Evangelical Lutheran Church (United States) =

Defunct Christian denomination in the United States

- Abbreviation: ELC
- Classification: Lutheran
- Associations: National Lutheran Council
- Region: United States
- Origin: 1917
- Merger of: Hauge Synod; Norwegian Synod; United Norwegian Lutheran Church of America
- Merged into: The American Lutheran Church (1960)
- Congregations: 2,482
- Members: 1,125,867
- Ministers: 2,242
- Other name: Norwegian Lutheran Church of America (1917–1946)

The Evangelical Lutheran Church (ELC) was a Lutheran denomination that existed from 1917, when it was founded as the Norwegian Lutheran Church of America (NLCA), until 1960, when it joined two other church bodies to form the second American Lutheran Church (ALC).

In 1959, just before its merger into the ALC, the ELC had 2,242 pastors, 2,482 congregations, and 1,125,867 members.

== Background ==
The Norwegian Lutheran Church of America was formed by the merger of the Hauge Synod (est. 1876), the Norwegian Synod (est. 1853), and the United Norwegian Lutheran Church of America (est. 1890). A group of congregations in the Norwegian Synod that did not agree with the theological stance of the new body formed the Norwegian Synod of the American Evangelical Lutheran Church, now known as the Evangelical Lutheran Synod. The NLCA changed its name to the Evangelical Lutheran Church in 1946 as part of its Americanization process.

In 1960, the ELC joined with Lutheran churches of German and Danish backgrounds to form the second American Lutheran Church, the first Lutheran body in North America to have multiple ethnic backgrounds. This coalescence of Lutheran churches continued into recent times, with the ALC later joining others 28 years later to form the Evangelical Lutheran Church in America in 1988.

== Colleges ==
- Augustana College in Sioux Falls, South Dakota
- Concordia College in Moorhead, Minnesota
- Luther College in Decorah, Iowa
- Pacific Lutheran University in Parkland, Washington
- St. Olaf College in Northfield, Minnesota
- Waldorf College in Forest City, Iowa (junior college at that time)

== Seminary ==
- Luther Theological Seminary in Saint Paul, Minnesota

== Presidents ==
- Hans Gerhard Stub, 1917–1925
- Johan Arnd Aasgaard, 1925–1954
- Fredrik A. Schiotz, 1954–1960

== Conventions ==
From 1917 to 1926 a general convention was held triennially. There was need of holding several extraordinary conventions, so beginning in 1928 (called the 8th) it was held biennially with the general convention always falling on the even numbered years. Voting members of the conventions were pastors who were currently serving congregations of the church, and one lay representative from each parish consisting of one congregation and two representatives from each parish consisting of two or more congregations.

- Organizing convention, 1917, Saint Paul, Minnesota
- 1st extraordinary, 1918, Fargo, North Dakota
- 1st general convention, 1920, Minneapolis, Minnesota
- 2nd extraordinary convention, 1922, Minneapolis, Minnesota
- 2nd general convention, 1923, Saint Paul, Minnesota
- 3rd extraordinary convention, 1925, Saint Paul, Minnesota
- 3rd general convention, 1926, Minneapolis, Minnesota
- 8th general convention, 1928, Minneapolis, Minnesota
- 9th general convention, 1930, Minneapolis, Minnesota
- 10th general convention, 1932, Minneapolis, Minnesota
- 11th general convention, 1934, Minneapolis, Minnesota
- 12th general convention, 1936, Minneapolis, Minnesota
- 13th general convention, 1938, Minneapolis, Minnesota
- 14th general convention, 1940, Minneapolis, Minnesota
- 15th general convention, 1942, Minneapolis, Minnesota
- 16th general convention, 1944, Minneapolis, Minnesota
- 17th general convention, 1946, Minneapolis, Minnesota
- 18th general convention, 1948, Minneapolis, Minnesota
- 19th general convention, 1950, Minneapolis, Minnesota
- 20th general convention, 1952, Minneapolis, Minnesota
- 21st general convention, 1954, Minneapolis, Minnesota
- 22nd general convention, 1956, Minneapolis, Minnesota
- 23rd general convention, 1958, Minneapolis, Minnesota
- 24th general convention, 1960, Minneapolis, Minnesota

== See also ==
- Evangelical Lutheran Synod
