= Hauge Synod =

Defunct Lutheran denomination in the United States

Hauge's Norwegian Evangelical Lutheran Synod in America
- Abbreviation: Hauge Synod
- Classification: Lutheran
- Region: United States
- Origin: 1876
- Separated from: Eielsen Synod
- Merged into: Norwegian Lutheran Church of America (1917)

The Hauge Synod (formally Hauge's Norwegian Evangelical Lutheran Synod in America) was the name of a Norwegian Lutheran church body in the United States in the late 19th century and early 20th century.

== Background ==
The Hauge Synod (Norwegian: Hauges norsk lutherske Synode i Amerika) was named after Norwegian revivalist lay preacher Hans Nielsen Hauge. The synod was low church, de-emphasizing formal worship and stressing personal faith in the Haugean tradition (haugianere).

The Hauge Synod was formed in 1876 following a split with The Evangelical Lutheran Church of North America (Eielsen Synod). The Eielsen Synod was founded in 1846 by Rev. Elling Eielsen in Jefferson Prairie Settlement, Wisconsin. Eielsen was a lay preacher and evangelist from Norway who is considered the chief transplanter of the Haugean movement from Norway to America.

Red Wing Seminary was the Hauge Synod educational center located in Red Wing, Minnesota. The Hauge Synod opened the seminary in 1879, and it continued in operation until 1917.

The Hauge Synod merged in 1917 into the Norwegian Lutheran Church of America. That group was later renamed the Evangelical Lutheran Church and then merged into the American Lutheran Church (ALC) in 1960. The ALC later merged into the Evangelical Lutheran Church in America.

== See also ==
- Norwegian-American Lutheranism

== Other sources ==
- Nelson, E. Clifford, and Fevold, Eugene L. The Lutheran Church among Norwegian-Americans: a history of the Evangelical Lutheran Church (Minneapolis: Augsburg Publishing House: 1960)
- Satre, Lowell J The Hauge's Synod: education for awakening (editors: Fevold, Eugene L. - Frost, Gerhard E. - Quanbeck, Warren A. - Sonnack, Paul G.: Decorah, Iowa: 1977)
