= Elling Eielsen =

First Norwegian Lutheran minister in the U.S.

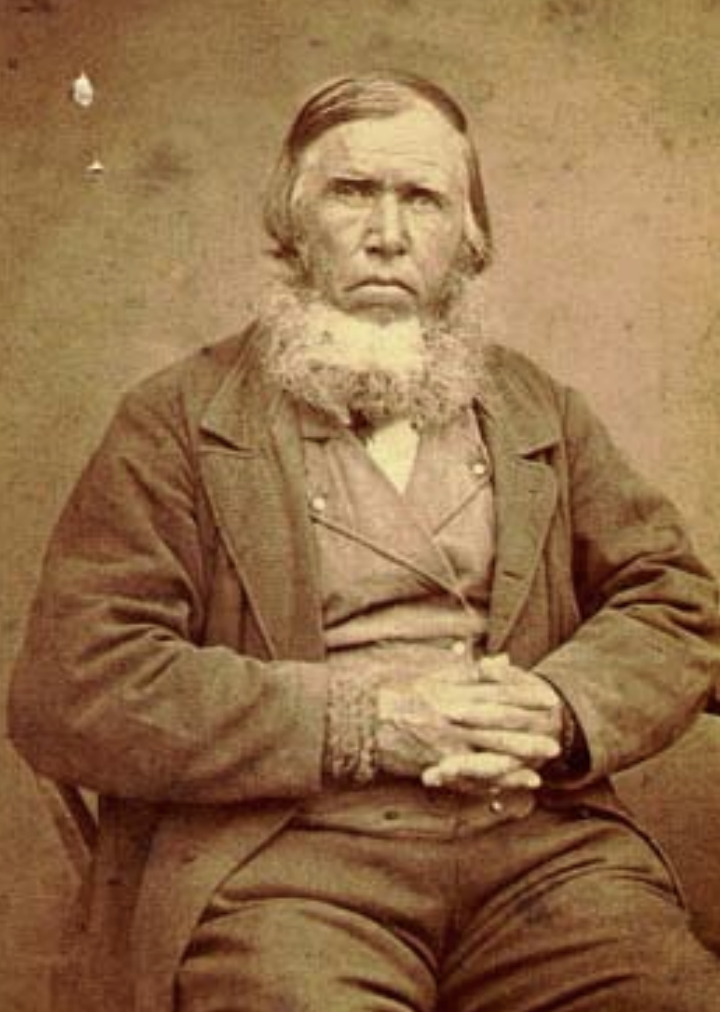
Elling Eielsen (1804-1883)

Elling Eielsen (September 19, 1804 – January 10, 1883) was a Norwegian-American minister and Lutheran Church leader. He was the first Norwegian Lutheran minister in the United States.

== Background ==
Eielsen was born and raised on the farm of Sundve (Sundve på Vossestrand) in Voss, Norway. The son of Eiel Ingebrigtsen Sundve and Anna Ellingsdatter Sundsvaal, he was brought up in the Lutheran religious tradition of Hans Nielsen Hauge. After his own religious awakening at the age of 25, he moved to Bergen, where he apprenticed as a carpenter and blacksmith and also enlisted in the army. He acted as a spiritual leader among his fellow soldiers, and in 1832, he accepted his first mission as a lay preacher. He traveled for several years extensively throughout Norway and also preached in Denmark where he was arrested and briefly imprisoned.

== Immigration ==
Eielsen immigrated to the United States in 1839. In 1843, he was formally ordained as a Lutheran minister by Francis Arnold Hoffmann, a German Lutheran pastor. Under Eielsen's leadership, a house of worship for Norwegian-American Lutherans was constructed at Fox River Lutheran Church near Norway, Illinois. Eislsen was resident pastor at the Jefferson Prairie Settlement from 1846 to 1872. Evangelical Lutheran Church in America (Eielsen Synod) founded in 1846 at the Jefferson Prairie Settlement, was to bear his name. He remained with the synod over the next 30 years and also continued as pastor-at-large for Norwegian-American communities in Wisconsin, Minnesota, South Dakota, and Texas. In 1873, he was living in Chicago where he died in 1883.

Eielsen was a leader in the Haugean pietistic Lutheran church reform movement which encouraged evangelism and vigorous lay leadership. His piety and reliance on lay leadership long remained a dominating influence for much of upper-Midwest Lutheranism.

== Additional sources ==
- Gross, Ernie (1990) This Day In Religion. (New York: Neal-Shuman Publishers, Inc.) ISBN 1-55570-045-4
- Halvorsen, Jens Braage, and Koht, Halvdan (1888) Norsk forfatterleksikon, 1814-1880. (Oslo. Den norske forlagsforening)
- Norlie, Olaf (1940) Elling Eielsen, a Brief History, Written for the Elling Eielsen Centennial, 1839-1939 ( Joliet, IL: C.H. Peterson Co.)
- Semmingsen, Ingrid and Haugen, Einar (1978) Norway to America: A History of the Migration (University of Minnesota Press) ISBN 978-1452902432
- Stoeffler, F. Ernest. ed. (1976) Continental Pietism and Early American Christianity (Grand Rapids, MI: Eerdmans) ISBN 978-0802816412
