= Norwegian Minnesotans =

Norwegian Minnesotan
Total population
- 868,361; 16.5% of the Minnesotan population

Regions with significant populations
- Minneapolis: 42,469
- Saint Paul: 25,537
- Rochester: 15,038
- Duluth: 13,919
- Moorhead: 13,712
- Bloomington: 13,214
- Plymouth: 12,618
- Coon Rapids: 11,163
- Maple Grove: 11,038
- Eagan: 10,128

Languages
- North-Central American English, Norwegian

Religion
- Lutheran with Jewish, Catholic and other Protestant minorities

Related ethnic groups
- Norwegian American

A Norwegian Minnesotan (colloquially sometimes known as a Minnewegian) is a Norwegian American in the U.S. state of Minnesota. As of 2024, 810,300 Minnesotans claim Norwegian ancestry—equivalent to 13.89% of Minnesota's population and 18.0% of the total Norwegian American population.

== Settlement ==
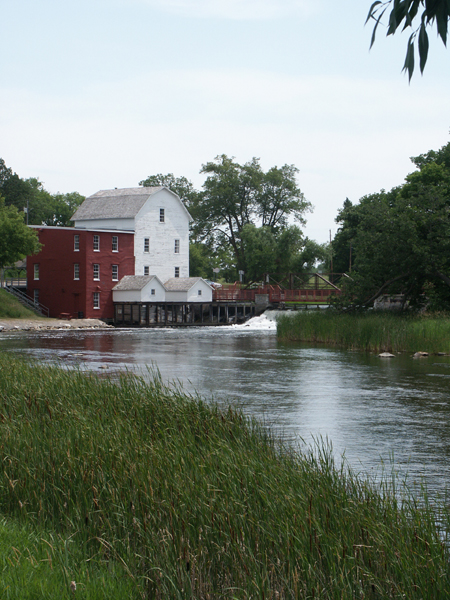
Many Norwegian settlers arrived and lived in various other locations in the United States before permanently settling in Minnesota.

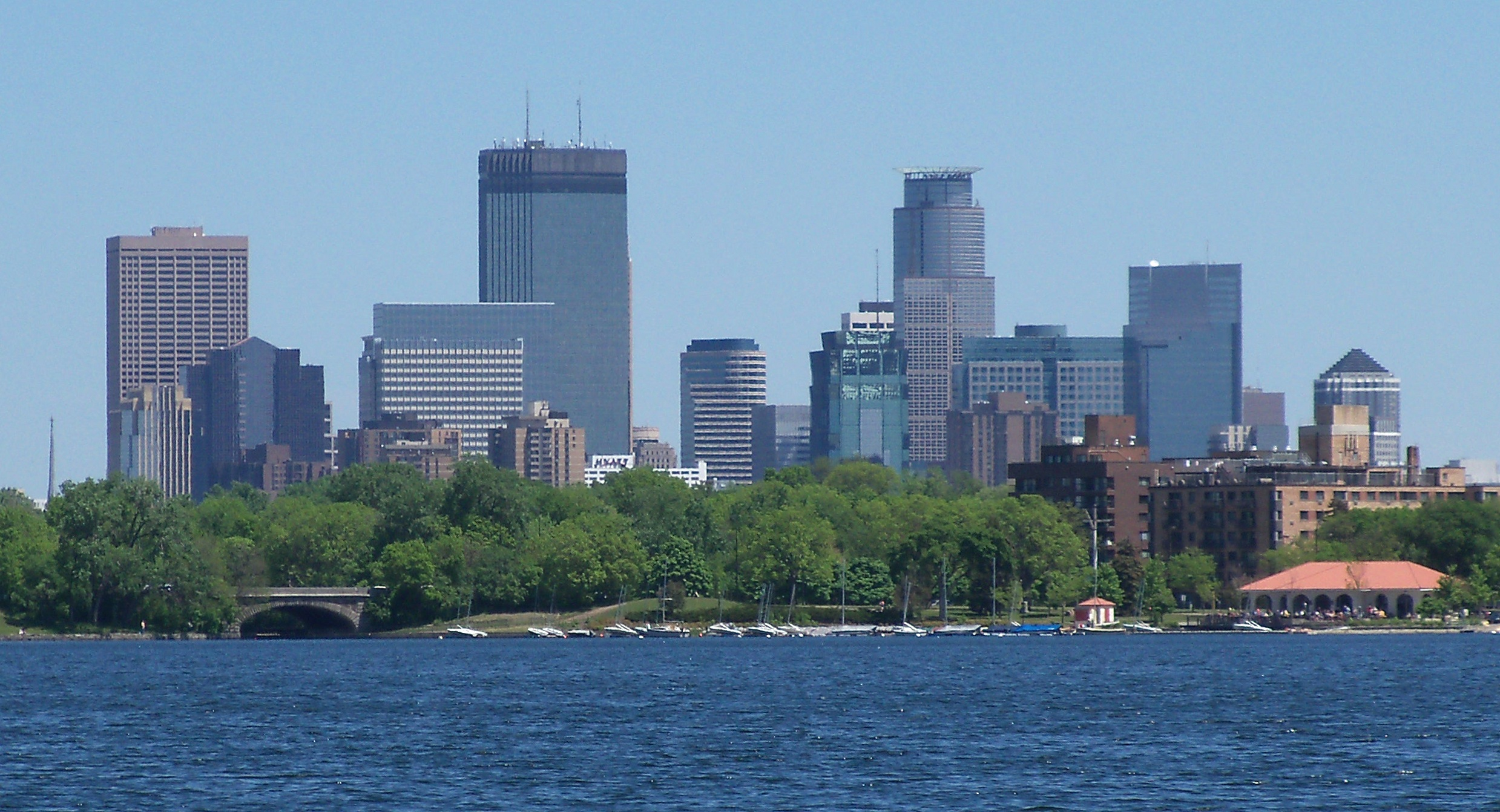
Minneapolis has the largest concentration of Norwegian descendants outside Norway, at 42,469.

Many Norwegian settlers arrived and lived in various other locations in the United States before permanently settling in Minnesota. The first Norwegian emigrants to come to the United States often settled in the eastern Midwest. As more and more new immigrants came to America there was a rapid increase in population at the original Norwegian settlements (which was helped along by a high birth rate). Thus, as more and more Norwegian settlers arrived, the original Norwegian settlements would move westward where land was plentiful and less expensive and where new settlements could be created.

Norwegian settlement in Minnesota increased after the American Civil War and the Dakota War of 1862, especially to the Minnesota River Valley, where land was taken through the Treaty of Traverse des Sioux. Following the war, the majority of the Dakota people were expelled from Minnesota and European settlement subsequently increased rapidly. Because the land of Minnesota was taken by force from the American Indians, land was cheap for European immigrants. Before long, this immigrant population grew exponentially in Minnesota.

Norwegians settled all over the state, but they established the first permanent settlements in the southeast. The first Norwegian settlement in Minnesota was Norwegian Ridge, in what is now Spring Grove, Minnesota. Another such settlement was the 1851 colony in Goodhue County, Minnesota. They soon settled in Fillmore County as well. In 1858, Minnesota officially became a state, welcoming in more new-comers. By 1860, half of Minnesota's 12,000 Norwegians resided in Goodhue, Fillmore, and Houston Counties. Ten years later, these three counties were home to nearly 25,000 of Minnesota's 50,000 Norwegian residents. By 1880, there were Norwegian settlements, beyond what has been previously listed, in the counties of Freeborn, Steele, and Waseca. Norwegians also made settlements in Blue Earth, Brown, and Watonwan (the "Linden Settlement"), Lac qui Parle County, the Park Region in west-central Minnesota, and the prairies of southwestern Minnesota.

Immigrants also came to the Red River Valley in northwestern Minnesota, settling in the counties of Clay, Marshall, Norman, and Polk. During the early 1870s, the St. Paul and Pacific Railroad helped increase migration to the Red River Valley. The railroad was first built to fill gaps between important waterways, but naturally became a hub for developed trade. As a result, by 1875 Norwegian immigrants made up a 30 percent of the total population of the counties of Polk and Clay. Later, immigrants also made homes in Grant, Pennington, Red Lake, Roseau, and Kittson Counties. Much of this land belonged to the Lakota and Nakota peoples.

The city of Duluth was also a center for Norwegian immigration. Its location on Lake Superior provided Norwegian fishermen with ample employment. Fishing is a common job in Norway, kept alive through economic and traditional methods. As a result, the Norwegian population of Duluth increased dramatically between 1870 and 1900. In 1870, 242 Norwegians were counted in Duluth. By 1900 the population had reached 7,500 people of Norwegian ancestry. As of 2021, 11,830 of Duluth's population claim Norwegian descent.

By the middle of the 1880s, Norwegian migration to Minnesota began to shift to the cities. There was a large influx of Norwegian immigrants into the city of Minneapolis from the 1880s to early 20th century, along with a less substantial migration to St. Paul.

== Traditions ==
Descendants of Norway are proud of their heritage and aim to keep their traditions alive. This is done through Foodways, by preparing meals of Norwegian culture. These foods could include Lutefisk, Lefse, and Krumkake; all common Norwegian food staples.

Traditions are also kept alive through activities and community. In Minnesota exists Norway House, not to be confused with Norway House. This Minnesota-based non-profit national center allows descendants to connect in community with cultural aspects of Norway. The goal of the organizations is for those that walk through the doors to truly feel at home.

Another traditional aspect practiced by Norwegian Americans is the celebration of Norwegian holidays such as National day (May 17). Those celebrating National day often wear Bunads, partake in parades and speeches, and listen to traditional folk tunes.

== Demographics ==
Of Minnesota's population in the year 2000, 850,742 said that they have Norwegian ancestry. Of them 414,901 (48.8%) were male, and 435,841 (51.2%) were female. As of 2008, the median age for Minnesotans with Norwegian descent was 36, in contrast to 35 for the whole Minnesotan population, 36.7 for the whole American population, and 39.4 for Norway's population.

Among Norwegians in Minnesota, 6.9% were younger than the age of 5 while only 6.6% of all Minnesotans were younger than the age of 5. Additionally, 7.6% of Norwegian Minnesotans were between 5 and 17 years of age, compared to 7.4% between 5 and 17 for the whole Minnesotan population. Population percentages for those older than 18 are about the same between Norwegian Minnesotans and the entire Minnesota population (85.9% and 85.8%, respectively).

As of 2024, approximately 810,300 Minnesotans claim Norwegian descent, making up 13.89% of the population. Additional data regarding these individuals is currently unavailable. Migration to and from Minnesota has brought annual fluctuations that are unlikely to settle until at least 2040. For additional information regarding Minnesota demographics, reference Demographics of Minnesota.

Year	Norwegian Minnesotans	Minnesotans	Percent of Minnesota's population	Norwegian Americans	Percent of Norwegian Americans
1980	712,258	4,075,970	19.1%	3,453,839	20.6%
1990	757,212	4,375,099	17.3%	3,869,395	19.5%
2000	850,742	4,919,479	17.3%	4,477,725	18.9%
2009	868,361	5,266,215	16.5%	4,642,526	18.7%

=== Norwegian communities in Minnesota ===
The 25 Minnesotan communities with the highest percentage of residents claiming Norwegian ancestry are:

1. Fertile, Minnesota 54.4%
2. Spring Grove, Minnesota 52.0%
3. Twin Valley, Minnesota 49.9%
4. Rushford, Minnesota 46.5%
5. Starbuck, Minnesota 45.0%
6. Hawley, Minnesota 44.5%
7. Ada, Minnesota 42.9%
8. Ulen, Minnesota 42.2%
9. Dawson, Minnesota 42.2%
10. Fosston, Minnesota 42.1%
11. Bagley, Minnesota 41.0%
12. Karlstad, Minnesota 39.4%
13. Thief River Falls, Minnesota 39.0%
14. Dane Prairie Township, Otter Tail County, Minnesota 39.0%
15. Madison, Minnesota 38.8%
16. Harmony, Minnesota 38.4%
17. Sparta Township, Minnesota 38.1%
18. Clarkfield, Minnesota 38.0%
19. Wanamingo, Minnesota 38.0%
20. Lake Park, Minnesota 37.2%
21. Montevideo, Minnesota 35.9%
22. Dunn Township, Minnesota 35.2%
23. Cormorant Township, Minnesota 34.9%
24. Oakport, Minnesota 34.3%
25. Houston, Minnesota 34.1%

=== Norwegian counties in Minnesota ===
The 25 Minnesotan counties with the highest percentage of residents claiming Norwegian ancestry are:

1. Norman County, Minnesota 58.9%
2. Pennington County, Minnesota 50.6%
3. Lac qui Parle County, Minnesota 47.9%
4. Marshall County, Minnesota 46.9%
5. Grant County, Minnesota 43.8%
6. Polk County, Minnesota 43.3%
7. Clearwater County, Minnesota 42.6%
8. Roseau County, Minnesota 42.3%
9. Clay County, Minnesota 42.2%
10. Pope County, Minnesota 39.7%
11. Chippewa County, Minnesota 39.4%
12. Fillmore County, Minnesota 39.0%
13. Yellow Medicine County, Minnesota 38.9%
14. Freeborn County, Minnesota 37.1%
15. Kittson County, Minnesota 35.4%
16. Red Lake County, Minnesota 33.9%
17. Houston County, Minnesota 33.4%
18. Swift County, Minnesota 33.4%
19. Otter Tail County, Minnesota 32.9%
20. Wilkin County, Minnesota 32.2%
21. Becker County, Minnesota 28.7%
22. Dodge County, Minnesota 28.6%
23. Kandiyohi County, Minnesota 28.6%
24. Douglas County, Minnesota 27.1%
25. Lake of the Woods County, Minnesota 27.0%

== Notable people ==
- Lars K. Aaker
- Johan Arnd Aasgaard
- Douglas K. Amdahl
- Richard Dean Anderson
- Sydney Anderson
- Roger Awsumb
- Dan Bakkedahl
- Earl Bakken
- Beatrice Gjertsen Bessesen
- Robert Bly
- Haldor Boen
- C. L. Brusletten
- Dustin Byfuglien
- Frederick William Cappelen
- Alf Clausen
- Larry Cole
- Theodora Cormontan
- Edgar Christensen
- Theodore Christianson
- Charles A. Christopherson
- George Dahl
- David Ellefson
- Arlen Erdahl
- Hal Erickson (American football)
- Willis H. Flygare
- Jacob Fjelde
- Paul Fjelde
- John Flittie
- Gerhard Forde
- Herbjørn Gausta
- Knut Gjerset
- Oluf Gjerset
- Henry J. Gjertsen
- Yung Gravy
- Alexander Grinager
- David Grose
- Ingebrikt Grose
- Bjarne Elgar Grottum
- Deb Haaland
- Carl G. O. Hansen
- Josh Hartnett
- Sig Haugdahl
- Gabriel Hauge
- Louis J. Hauge Jr.
- Marty Haugen
- Pete Hegseth
- Garrett Hedlund
- Tippi Hedren
- Skitch Henderson
- Adolph Herseth
- Ivan Hinderaker
- Einar Hoidale
- Chet Holmgren
- John O. Johnson
- Leon H. Johnson
- Ron Johnson
- V. Trygve Jordahl
- Carl O. Jorgenson
- Hannah Kempfer
- Albert C. Knudson
- Odin Langen
- Arthur B. Langlie
- Keith Langseth
- Robert E. A. Lee
- C. Walton Lillehei
- Warren Magnuson
- Pearl McIver
- Ernest O. Melby
- David Minge
- Walter Mondale
- Adolph Murie
- Olaus Murie
- Wayne Nordhagen
- Karen Nyberg
- Ingerval M. Olsen
- Julius J. Olson
- Mark Olson (musician)
- Sara Jane Olson
- Henry Orth
- Oscar S. Paulson
- Chris Pratt
- J. A. O. Preus II
- Carlton C. Qualey
- Al Quie
- Max Ramsland
- Ole Ramsland
- Sarah Ramsland
- Harley Refsal
- Anton J. Rockne
- Karl Rolvaag
- Ole Edvart Rølvaag
- Nils Nilsen Ronning
- Esther Rose
- Erick Rowan
- Peter O. Sathre
- Conrad Selvig
- David Senjem
- Henrik Shipstead
- Dale Smedsmo
- Konrad K. Solberg
- Ossie Solem
- Charles Stenvig
- Carl F. Struck
- Arnold Sundgaard
- Bud Svendsen
- Steve Sviggum
- Laurits Swenson
- Oscar A. Swenson
- Henry O. Talle
- Kari Tauring
- Herman Thorson
- Bud Tingelstad
- Shantel VanSanten
- Andrew Volstead
- Lindsey Vonn
- Owen Harding Wangensteen
- Harold Windingstad

== See also ==
- Norwegian Americans
- Norwegian Dakotan
- Native Americans in Minnesota
