= Gjerset =

Gjerset or Gjerseth is a Norwegian surname. Notable people with the surname include:

- Kjell Gjerseth (1946–2025), Norwegian novelist and journalist
- Knut Gjerset (1865–1936), Norwegian-born American writer and historian
- Oluf Gjerset (1848–1941), Norwegian-born American politician
