= Susanne Crane =

American artist based in Minnesota

Susanne Maria Crane (born 1966) is an American artist based in Minnesota.

== Life and works ==
Crane was born in Frankfurt, Germany, and moved to the United States as a small child. She grew up in La Crosse, Wisconsin, where she was active in the arts and theatre. She moved to Minneapolis in 1991.

Crane was the founder/owner of the cooperative art gallery, The Art Underground, from 1995 to 2000 which was located at 50th and Bryant in Minneapolis, Minnesota. She is known for her works in montage format, imbued with symbolic mythological images of spiritual mystical realism. Her colorful acrylic paintings explore folk tales and mythology, particularly from Asian, Mexican, African and Native American history, with a dreamlike painting style.

Crane has exhibited her work for more than 20 years in Minnesota, including a "Charlie Brown Around Town" statue in 2001 in St. Paul. She works from her studio in a large historic building in Albert Lea.

She has organized a series of 18 murals in the city of Albert Lea and is an organizer of the Freeborn County Arts Initiative (formed in 2012). In 2005 Crane began to restore the Bessessen Opera House, as well as creating new venues, in Southeastern Minnesota. She teaches art at several locations in Minneapolis.
