= Beatrice Gjertsen Bessesen =

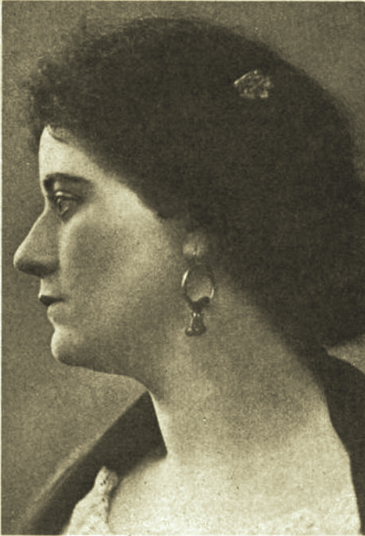

Background information
- Born: Beatrice Gjertsen; 1886; Minneapolis, Minnesota, U.S.
- Died: September 7, 1935 (aged 48–49)
- Occupations: operatic soprano; voice teacher
- Formerly of: St. Olaf Choir
- Spouse: William A. Bessessen (m. 1915)

Beatrice Gjertsen Bessesen (1886 – September 7, 1935) was an American operatic soprano. She was the president of the Twin City Music and Dramatic Club. Bessesen sang with the St. Olaf Choir and toured with it in Norway. She made successful concert tours in the U.S. and Europe, appearing with various European opera companies. She sang in practically all the leading centers of Europe, and was the prima donna in many big operas. She was a strong factor in developing cultural and artistic appreciation among Norwegian Minnesotans. She is the namesake of the Bessesen Building, which is on the National Register of Historic Places listings in Minnesota.

== Early life and education ==
Beatrice Gjertsen was born in Minneapolis, Minnesota, 1886. Her parents were Senator Henry J. Gjertsen of Norway and Marguerite (Goebel) Gjertsen of Germany.

Bessesen was educated at South High School, where she sang at the school and church concerts. She studied voice culture with Anna Smith-Behrens. After graduating from the University of Minnesota, she was sent abroad where she studied with the Wagnerian soprano Mathilde Mallinger (1847–1920) in Berlin and Aglaja Orgeni in Dresden.

== Career ==
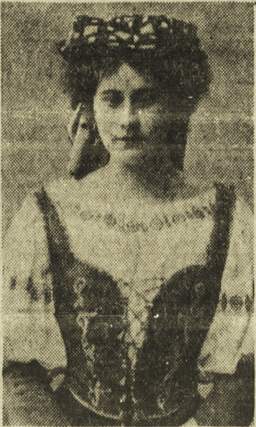
Beatrice Gjertsen (1910)

Early in her career, Bessessen made successful concert tours in the U.S. and Europe, appearing with various European opera companies. For several years, she was prima donna soprano at the Ducal Opera House (now, Deutsches Nationaltheater und Staatskapelle Weimar) in Weimar, Germany. She was decorated by the Kaiser of Germany. In 1910, she created a principal role of a new opera in Germany, Das Gelobnes, composed by Baroness Cornelie Van Osterzee. She returned to the U.S. in 1917, just before the start of World War I.

Bessessen served for three years as president of Twin City Music and Dramatic Association which she organized. At the organization's meetings, she was influential toward educating the members to a higher appreciation of music and the opera, by speeches and explanatory remarks. Her main desire was to further home talent.

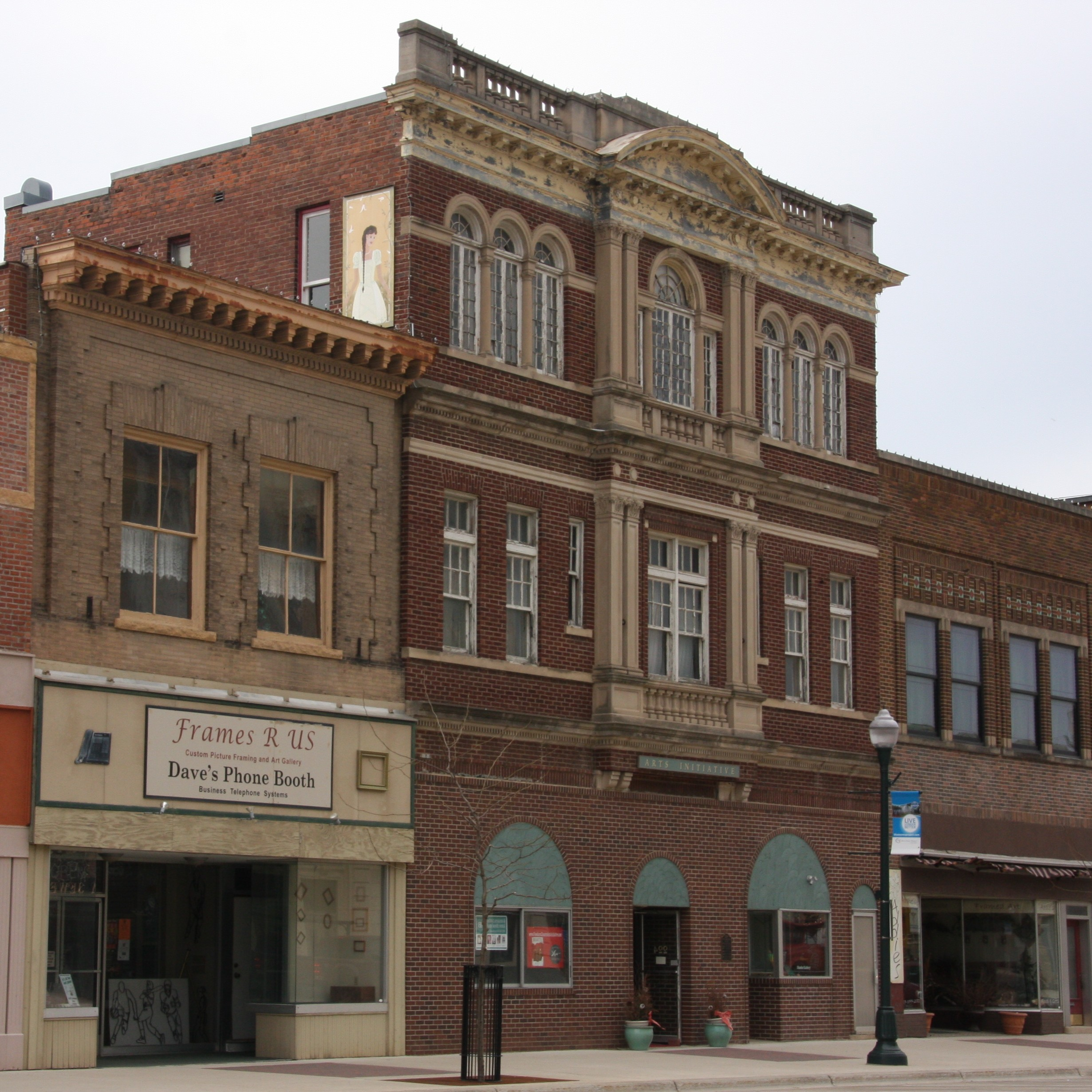
Bessesen Building, Albert Lea, Minnesota

The Beatrice Bessesen Theater (now, Bessesen Building) opened in Albert Lea, Minnesota in September 1916. It seated about a thousand people. Its entire front balcony was composed of boxes. Bessesen's studio rooms were on the second floor. Piano, voice and dramatic branches were taught in the conservatory. The theater was used during the season as a movie house, with certain times reserved for concerts and public recitals of the pupils of the school.

In 1931, the Park-Stanford Conservatory in Minneapolis was under Bessesen's direction.

== Personal life ==
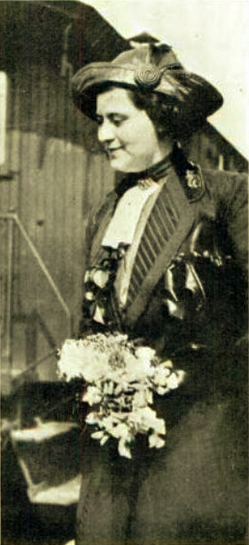
Beatrice Gjertsen Bessesen (1921 publication)

She married Dr. William A. Bessessen of Albert Lea, Minnesota, January 4, 1915 at the Odin Club, Minneapolis, which was founded by her father. She had six children: sons, William, Jr., Adrian, Truman, and Paul, as well as two daughters, Monica and Beatrice.

The family home was a "mecca" to a large number of artists and music lovers.

She was active in Minnesota State Sunshine Society work and was a member of the Pollyanna Circle, a member of the Zuhrah Ladies and the Order of the Eastern Star.

== Death and legacy ==
Beatrice Gjertsen Bessesen died September 7, 1935. Her personal papers are held by the Minnesota Historical Society.
