= John Stewart Socha =

John Stewart Socha is a Spring Grove, Minnesota-based radio broadcaster and journalist who specializes in technology subjects.

Socha, originally working on the air as John Stewart, began his broadcasting career in 1981 was an on-air personality at WTMJ in Milwaukee, and later hosted the "Morning Report" at WOAI in San Antonio, Texas. In 1990, he relocated to Spring Grove, Minnesota to create ACPress.com, which offered audio and mixed media tutorials for new computer users. He also produced The Radio Computer Magazine, which was syndicated on the Sun Radio Network, and was a guest commentator on high-tech issues for the Business News Network, WBAL radio in Baltimore, and the Australian Triple M Network's weekly Byte This program.

Socha also wrote articles on both digital and film photography, using the byline "John Stewart," for eDigitalPhoto and Shutterbug magazines. They can now be found in the Shutterbug web site archives. He has also been cited in numerous publications as an expert in high-tech issues.

From 2001 - 2006, he was station manager for WKBH, a Roman Catholic radio station in La Crosse, Wisconsin. Socha now produces radio, television and multimedia projects for a number of non-profit organizations, including the Catholic Diocese of LaCrosse. He has hosted and produced more than 500 weekly radio shows, "Connecting The Diocese." [diolc.org/connecting]

To date, Socha has produced and narrated 12 audio tutorials, ranging from the 1994 “The DOS Tape” to computer-based CDs tutorials for first-time users of digital cameras and eBay auctions. His wife, book designer and editor Alice Andersen, has co-written and co-produced these tutorials. Socha has also brought his expertise to Western Technical College in LaCrosse, where he taught non-credit courses on digital photography.

Socha received the 2005 Distinguished Netizen Award from SharewareJunkies.com for his work in high-tech journalism and computer education.

For more than six years, he has answered listeners' questions on a popular statewide mid-day show hosted by Larry Meillor on Wisconsin Public Radio (wpr.org). He published (2012) the (printed) book, How To Use The Digital Camera You Just Bought! and a second edition is now in print.
