= Giants of the Earth Heritage Center =

Museum in Spring Grove, Minnesota

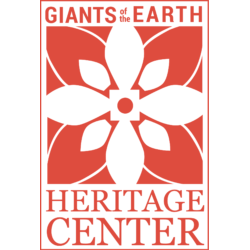

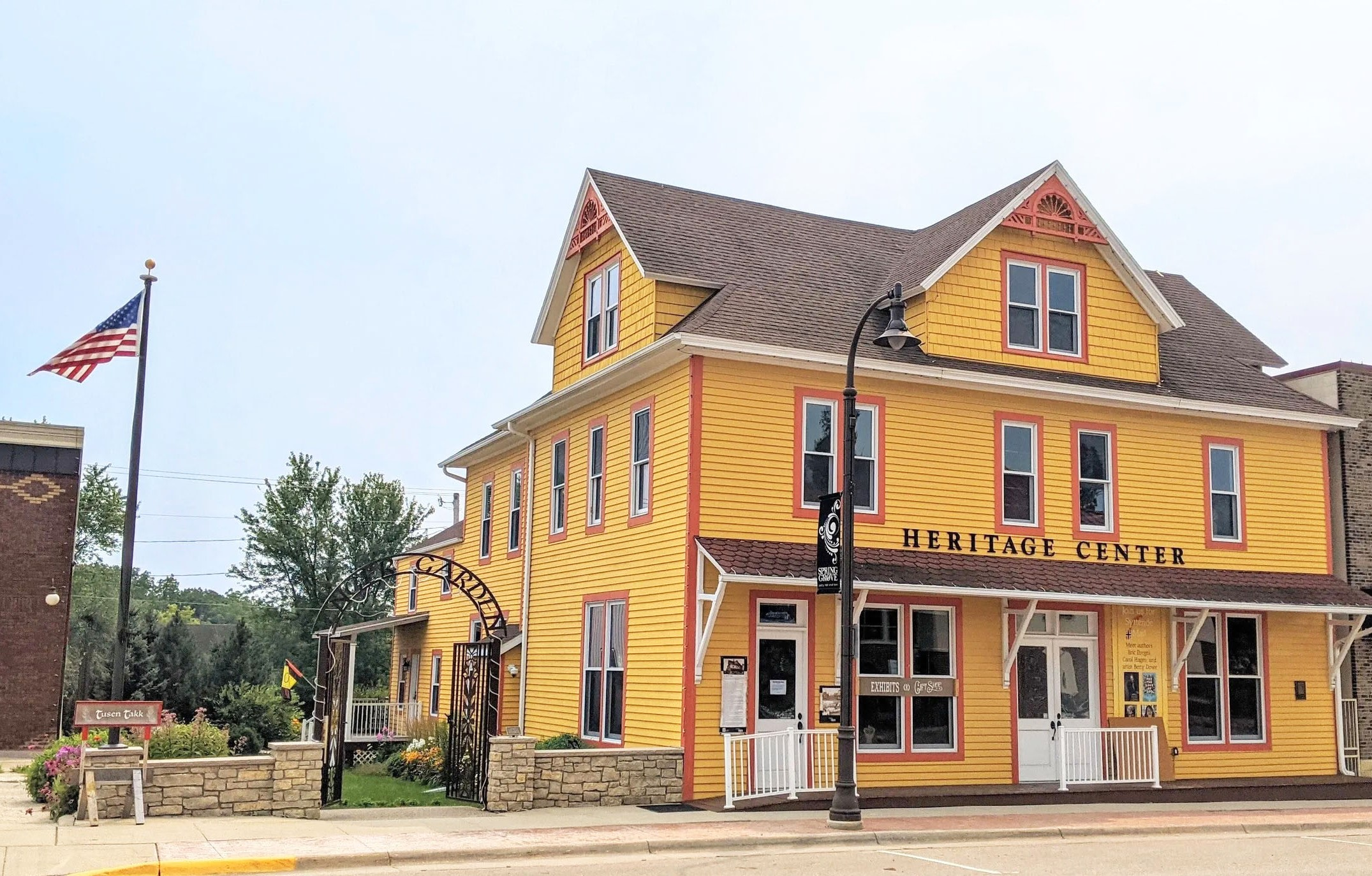
- Giants of the Earth Heritage Center at the historic Ballard Hotel
- Established: 2009
- Location: 163 West Main Street, Spring Grove, Minnesota
- Coordinates: 43.5606°N 91.6384°W
- Type: History
- Website: https://giantsoftheearth.org

The Giants of the Earth Heritage Center is a non-profit historical society located in Spring Grove, Minnesota. Established in 2009, it is the state's first Norwegian settlement. The center's mission is to honor, preserve, and interpret the history and heritage of the people from Spring Grove's Norwegian Ridge in southeastern Minnesota.

== Programs and services ==
The center offers a variety of programs and services, including:

- Genealogy services: They can help people explore their family histories, create family trees, connect with relatives, and preserve family stories and artifacts.
- Educational programs: They offer educational programs on a variety of topics related to history, culture, and genealogy. These programs are designed for people of all ages.
- Community events: They host a variety of community events throughout the year, such as festivals, lectures, and workshops.
- The center also has a gallery that exhibits the history and culture of Spring Grove Norwegian Ridge area.

== Exhibit "Peter, Ola, and Per" ==
"Peter, Ola, and Per" opened March 16, 2023. The exhibit explores cartoonist Peter J. Rosendahl, and his Norwegian-American comic strip "Han Ola og han Per" that chronicled the lives and adventures the adventures of two Norwegians who immigrated to America. The comic strip ran from 1918 until 1935.

=== Images ===
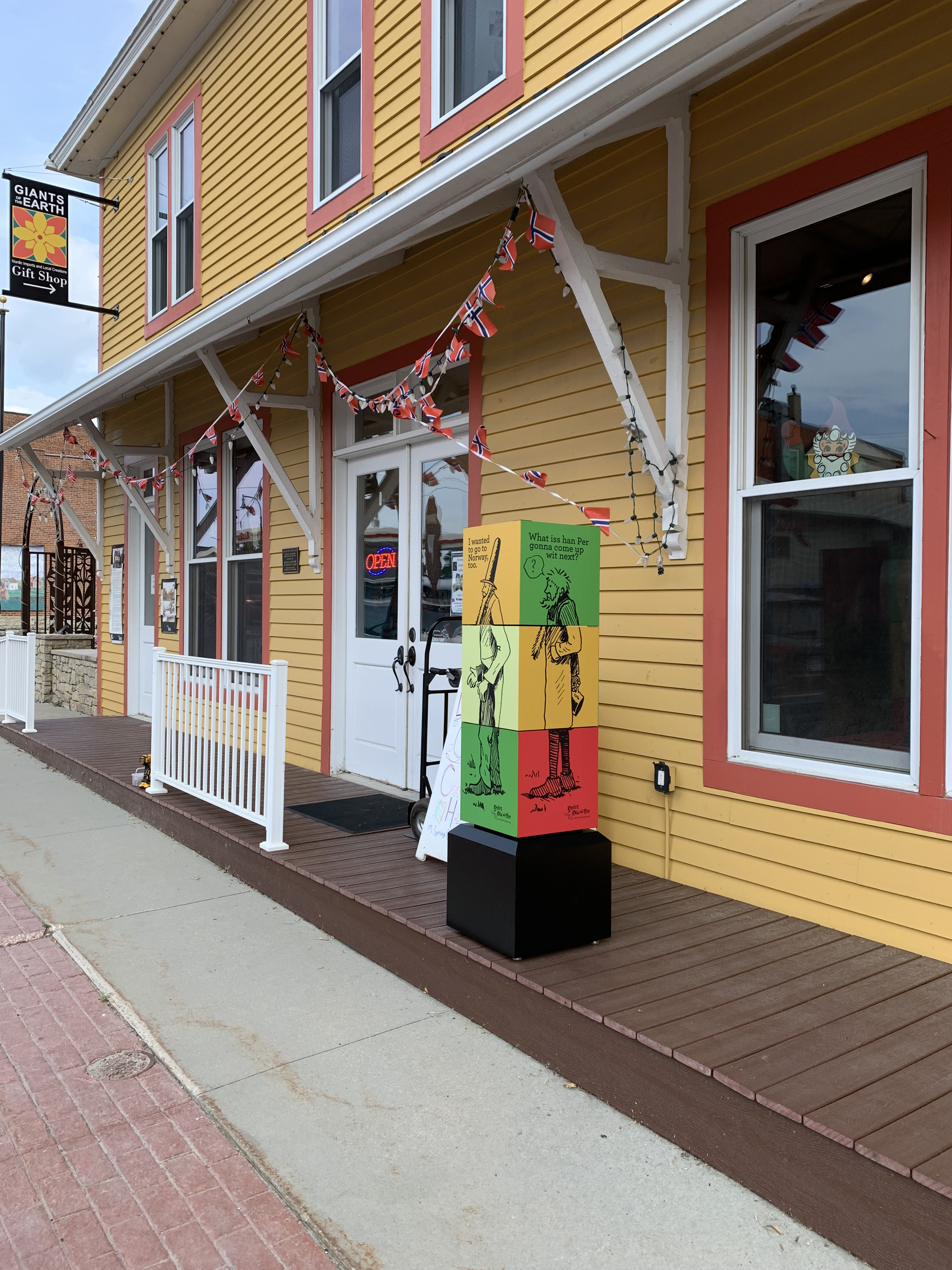
Interactive entrance graphic

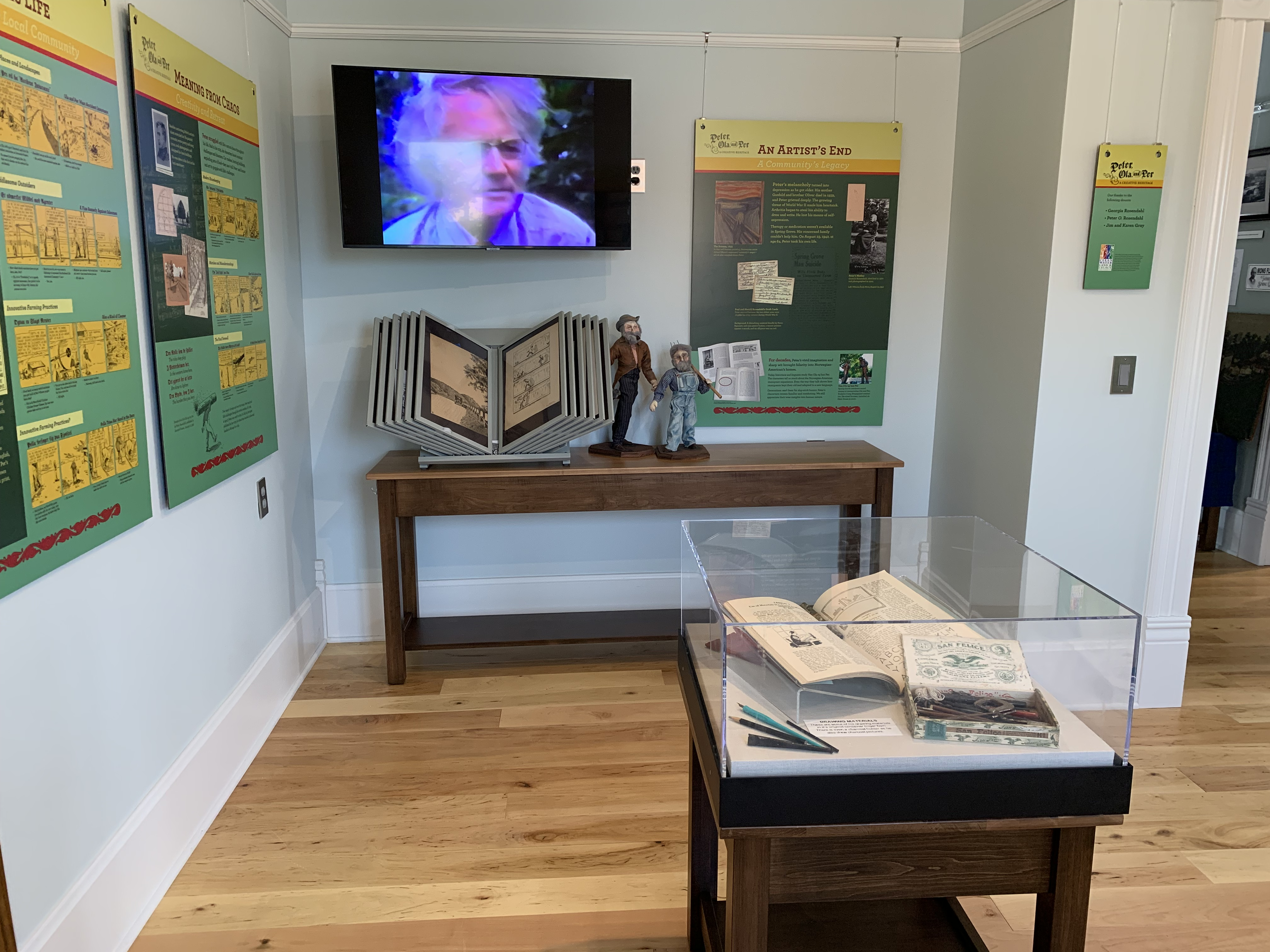
Video commentary by Robert Bly

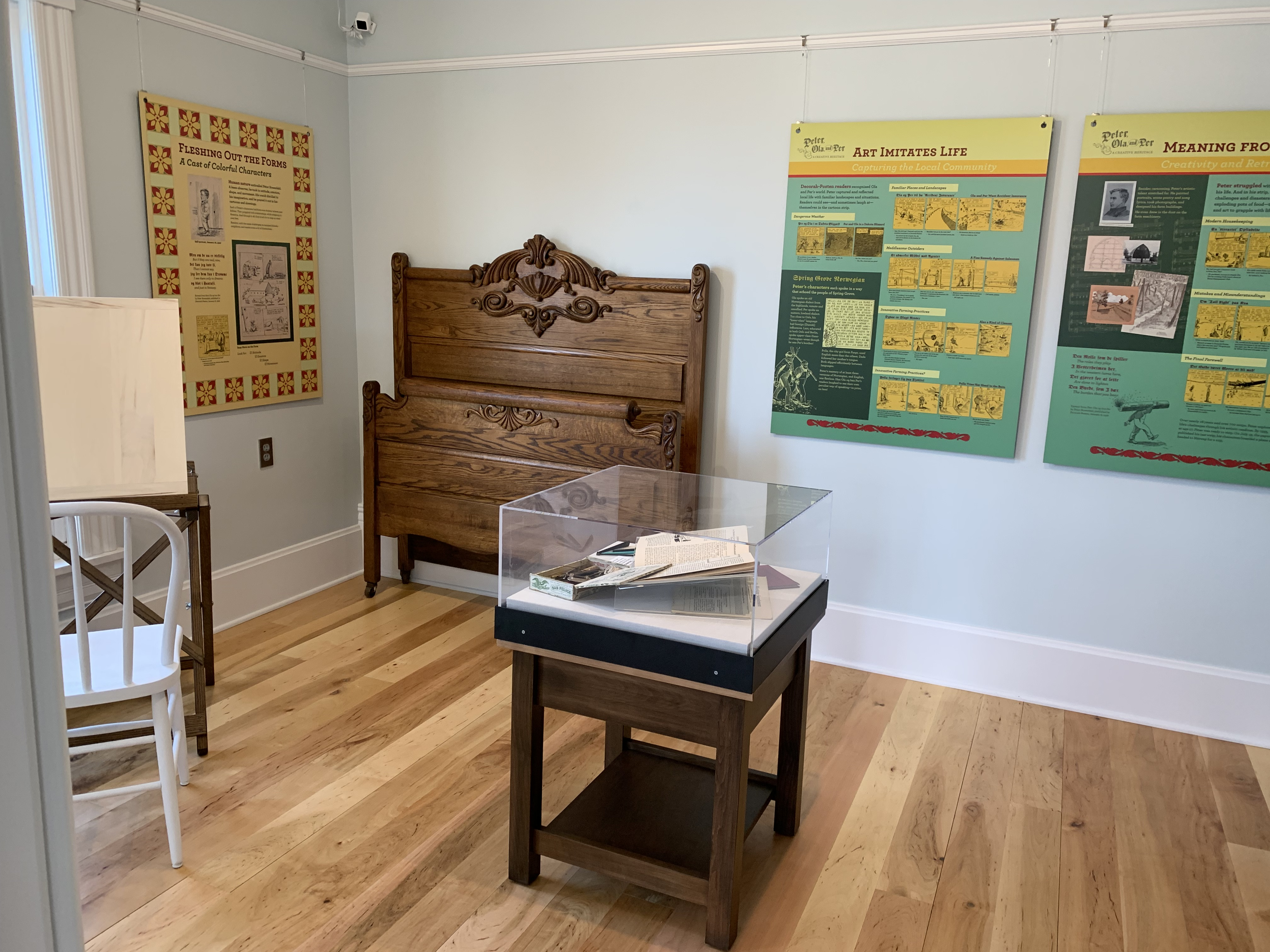
Objects from Rosendahl's life

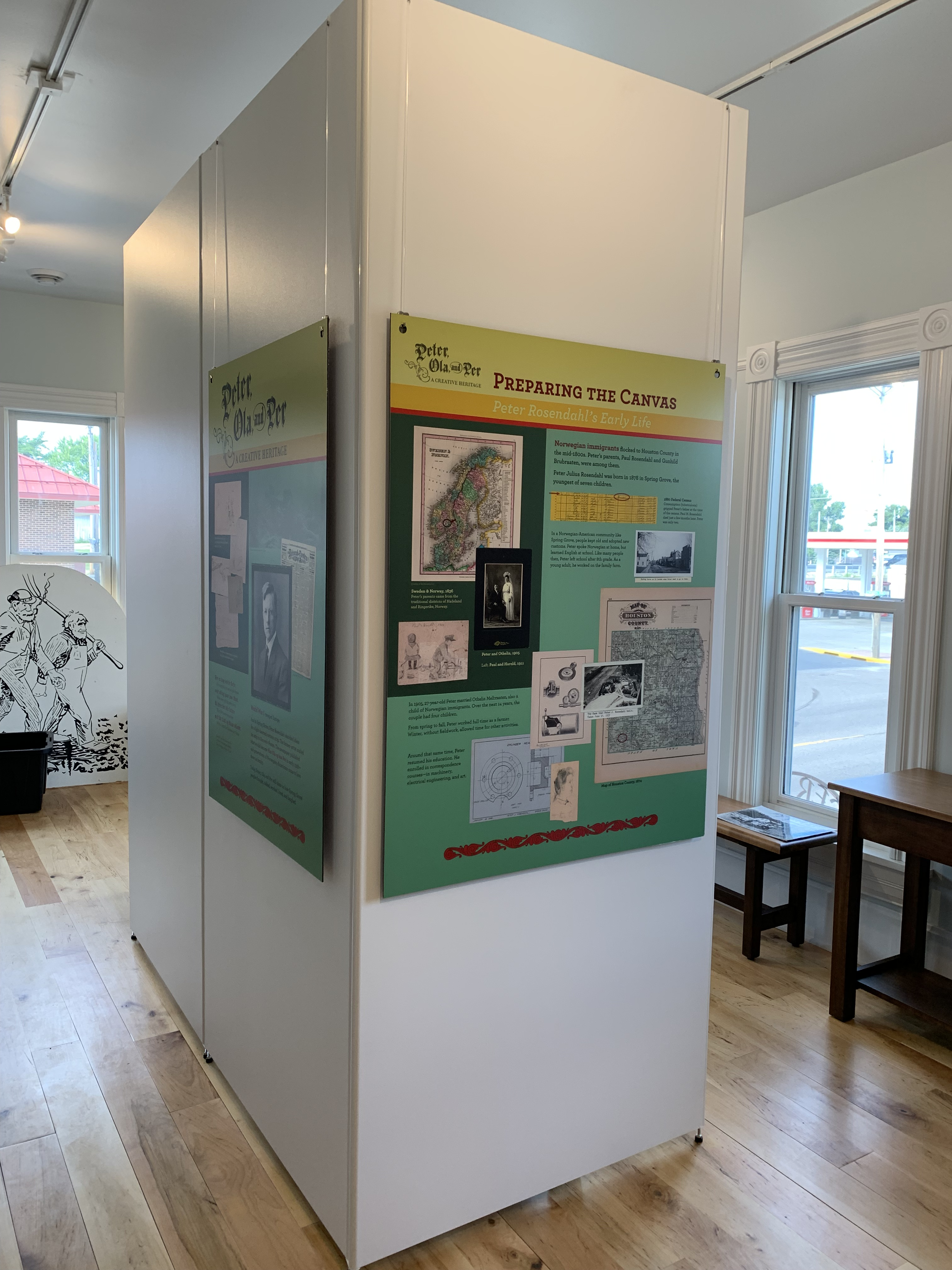
Display island

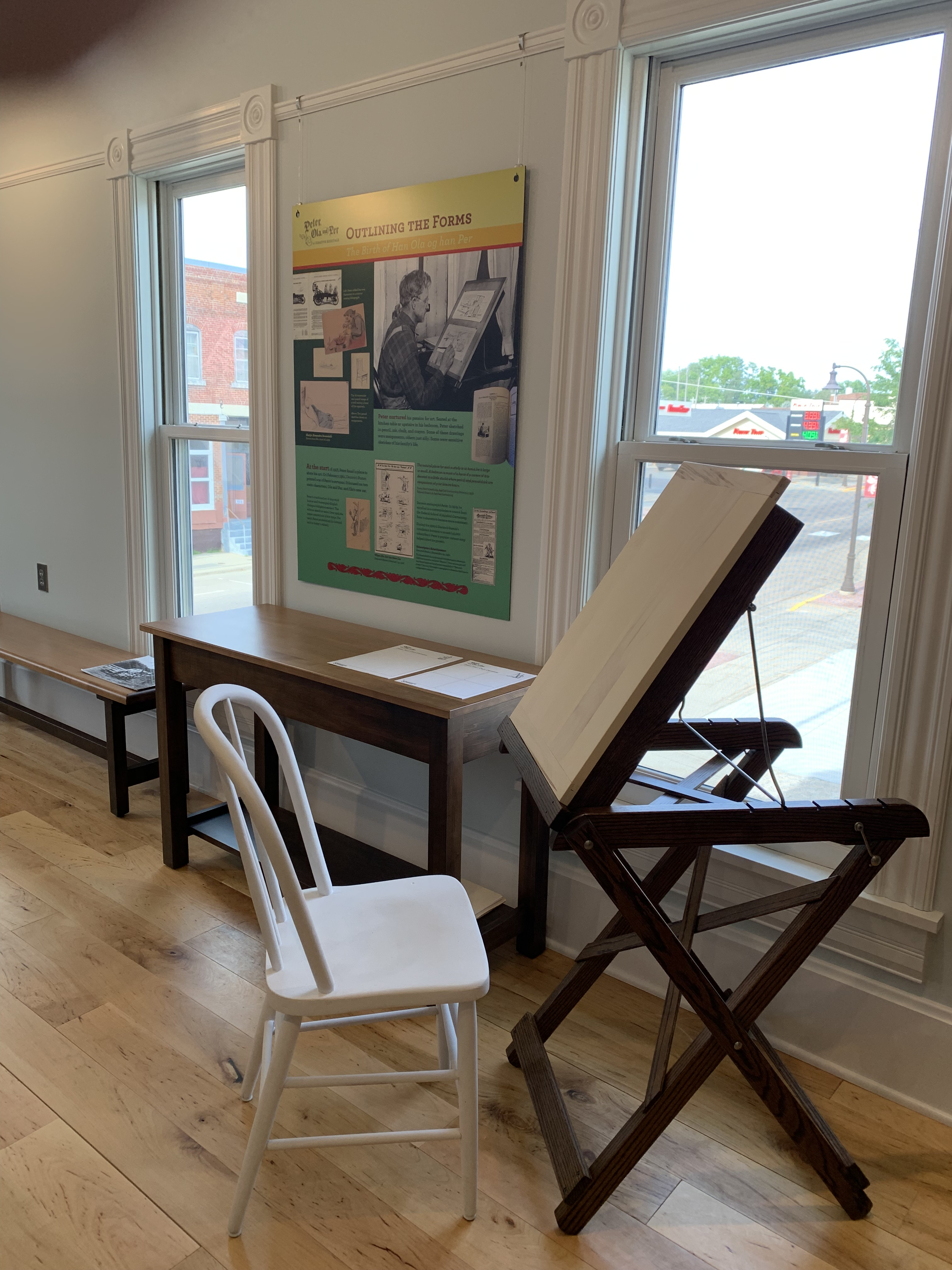
Drawing table replica

== See also ==
- Giants in the Earth (novel)
