= Spring Grove Public Library =

Library in Minnesota

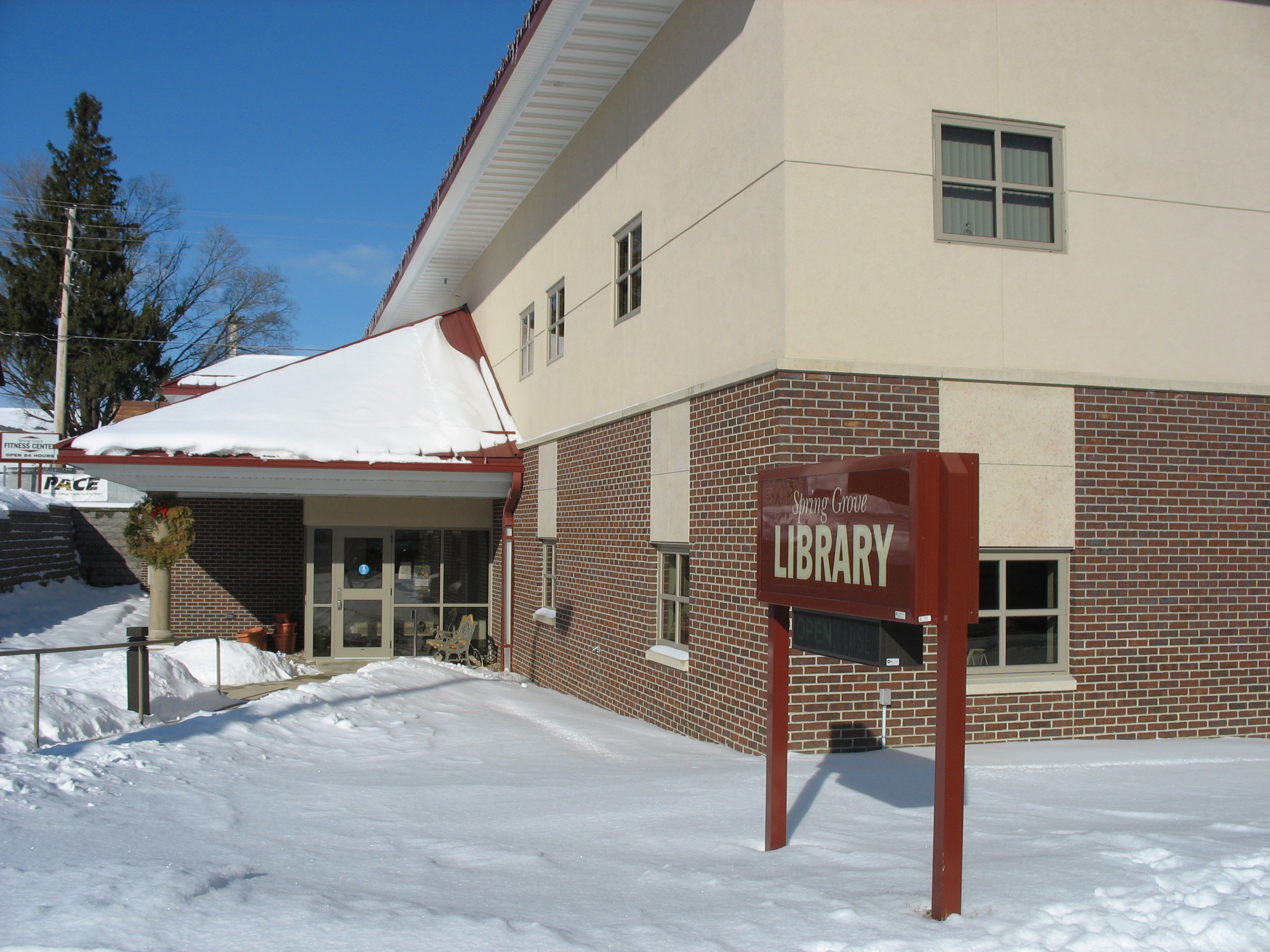
- Spring Grove Public Library
- 43.56097°N 91.6388°W
- Location: 172 West Main; Spring Grove, MN 55974

The Spring Grove Public Library is a library in Spring Grove, Minnesota. It is a member of Southeastern Libraries Cooperating, the SE Minnesota library region.
