= Demographics of Minnesota =

- Population pyramid in 2019
- Population: ▲5,717,184 (2026)
- Density: 27.81/km^{2} (72.0/sq mi)
- Birth rate: ▼11.2 per 1,000 (2020)
- Death rate: ▼9.2 per 100,000 (2020)
- Life expectancy: ▲79.1 years (2020)
  - male: ▲76.8 years of age (2020)
  - female: ▲81.4 years of age (2020)
- Fertility rate: ▲58.6/1,000 women 15-44 (2021)
- Infant mortality: ▼4.0/1,000 live births (2021)

The demographics of Minnesota are tracked by the United States Census Bureau, with additional data gathered by the Minnesota State Demographic Center. According to the most recent estimates, Minnesota's population as of 2020 was approximately 5.7 million, making it the 22nd most populous state in the United States. The total fertility rate in Minnesota was roughly 1.87 in 2019, slightly below the replacement rate of 2.1.

For decades, Minnesota has been characterized by a higher number of births than deaths. The state has seen significant population growth in the past century, both through natural increase and immigration. In 2020, approximately 8% of the population was foreign-born.

In the late 19th and early 20th centuries, Minnesota was a significant destination for European immigrants, especially from Germany, Norway, and Sweden. In more recent years, the state has become a new home for refugees and immigrants from Latin America (primarily Mexicans, Salvadorans, and Ecuadorians), East Africa (especially Somalis and Ethiopians), South Asia (mostly Indians), West Africa (primarily Liberians) and Southeast Asia (primarily Hmong, Burmese, Lao, and Vietnamese communities).

The population of Minnesota is not only diverse in terms of birthplace and ancestry, but also in terms of age and socioeconomic status. Minnesota boasts a well-educated populace, with one of the highest high school graduation rates in the nation and a robust system of public and private colleges and universities. With a median household income of around $70,000 in 2019, Minnesota is a predominantly middle-class state. However, income disparities and child poverty rates have been persistent issues, reflecting broader national trends.

As of 2020, Minnesota was among the top states in the nation for life expectancy, health care access, and quality of life. Furthermore, Minnesota is known for its commitment to environmental stewardship and outdoor recreation, with numerous state parks, forests, and water bodies.

== Population ==
Historical population
Census	Pop.	Note	%±
1850	6,077		—
1860	172,023		2,730.7%
1870	439,706		155.6%
1880	780,773		77.6%
1890	1,310,283		67.8%
1900	1,751,394		33.7%
1910	2,075,708		18.5%
1920	2,387,125		15.0%
1930	2,563,953		7.4%
1940	2,792,300		8.9%
1950	2,982,483		6.8%
1960	3,413,864		14.5%
1970	3,804,971		11.5%
1980	4,075,970		7.1%
1990	4,375,099		7.3%
2000	4,919,479		12.4%
2010	5,303,925		7.8%
2020	5,706,494		7.6%
2025 (est.)	5,830,405		2.2%
Source: 1910–2020; 2025 Estimate

Minnesota's population experienced significant growth over the years. In 1850, the state had fewer than 6,100 residents, which expanded to over 1.75 million by 1900. Throughout the following six decades, there was a consistent increase of 15.0% in population, reaching 3.41 million in 1960. Subsequently, the growth rate slowed, with an 11.0% rise to 3.8 million in 1970. Over the next three decades, the population continued to grow at an average rate of 9.0%, resulting in a population of 4.91 million according to the 2000 census. In 2020, the population was approximately 5.7 million.

Minnesota's population trends, age distribution, and gender ratios closely approximate the national average. However, it is worth noting that minority groups in Minnesota constitute a smaller proportion of the overall population compared to the nation as a whole.

The center of population in Minnesota is located in Hennepin County, specifically in the city of Rogers.

The population distribution by age in the 2019 American Community Survey was:

- Under 5 years: 6.2%
- 5–9 years: 6.5%
- 10–14 years: 6.5%
- 15–19 years: 6.6%
- 20–24 years: 6.8%
- 25–34 years: 13.7%
- 35–44 years: 12.7%
- 45–54 years: 12.6%
- 55–59 years: 7.1%
- 60–64 years: 6.3%
- 65–74 years: 9.3%
- 75–84 years: 4.4%
- 85 years and over: 1.3%

Approximately 60% of the state's population lives within the Minneapolis-St. Paul metropolitan area and 40% in the remainder of the state. This is a result of the migration of jobs from farming, mining, and logging, prevalent in the 19th century, to the current concentration in professional, office, and service jobs, concentrated in the metropolitan areas.

=== Most populous counties ===
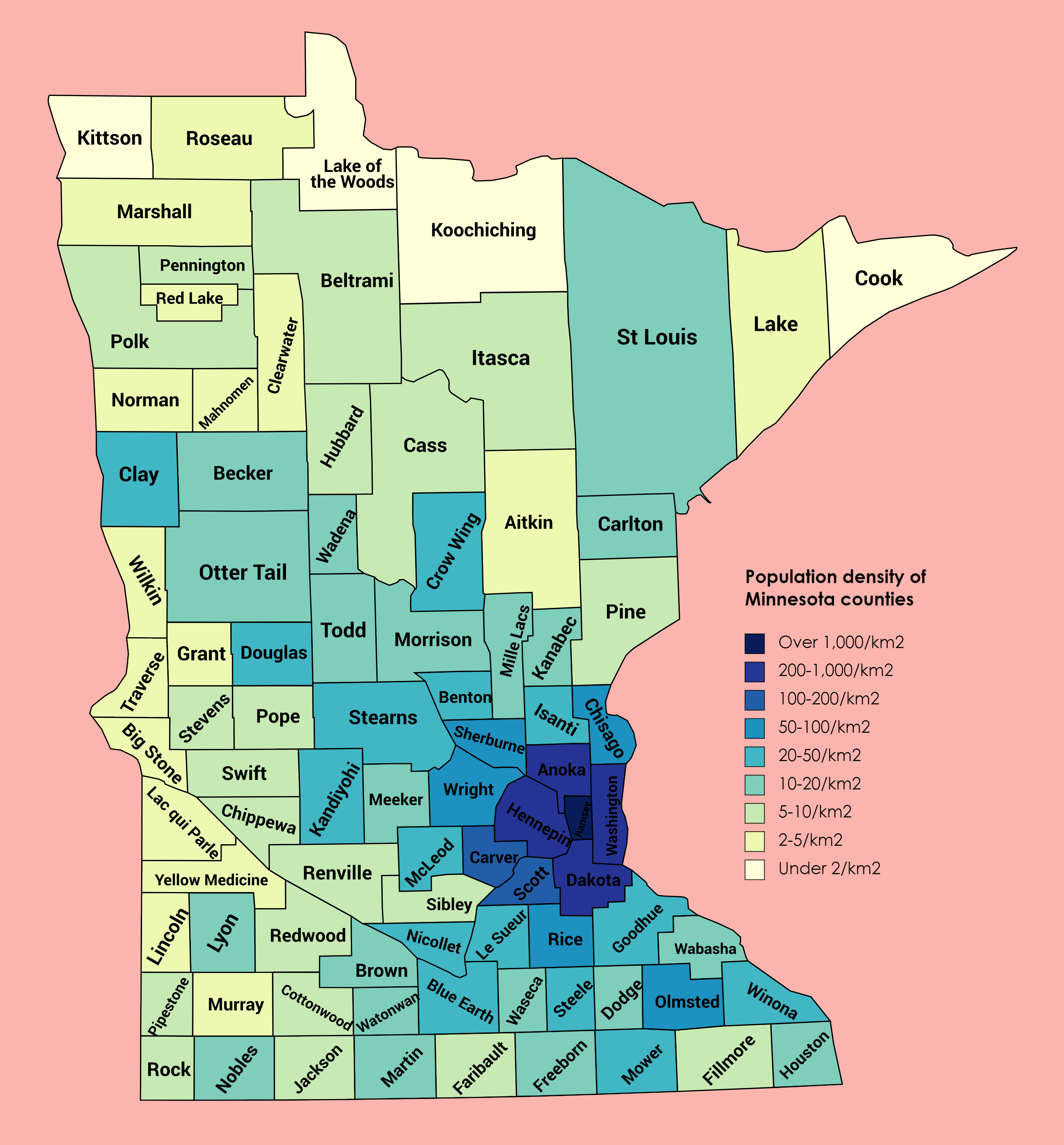
A population density map of Minnesota by county

2023 rank	County	Seat city	2020 Census	2023 Estimate	% gain since 2020
1	Hennepin	Minneapolis	1,281,565	1,258,713	−1.78%
2	Ramsey	Saint Paul	552,352	536,075	−2.95%
3	Dakota	Hastings	439,882	447,440	+1.72%
4	Anoka	Anoka	363,887	372,441	+2.35%
5	Washington	Stillwater	267,568	278,936	+4.25%
6	St. Louis	Duluth	200,231	200,514	+0.14%
7	Olmsted	Rochester	162,847	164,784	+1.19%
8	Stearns	St. Cloud	158,292	160,977	+1.70%
9	Scott	Shakopee	150,928	155,814	+3.24%
10	Wright	Buffalo	141,337	151,150	+6.94%
11	Carver	Chaska	106,922	111,057	+3.87%
12	Sherburne	Elk River	97,183	102,206	+5.17%
13	Blue Earth	Mankato	69,112	70,006	+1.29%
14	Crow Wing	Brainerd	66,123	68,304	+3.30%
15	Rice	Faribault	67,097	67,948	+1.27%
16	Clay	Moorhead	65,318	66,258	+1.44%
17	Otter Tail	Fergus Falls	60,081	60,626	+0.91%
18	Chisago	Center City	56,621	58,535	+3.38%
19	Winona	Winona	49,671	49,721	+0.10%
20	Goodhue	Red Wing	47,582	48,035	+0.95%

== Race and ethnicity ==
Racial and ethnic composition as of the 2020 Census
Race and ethnicity	Percent of population
White	76.3%
Black	7.0%
Multiracial	6.1%
Hispanic and Latino	6.0%
Asian	5.2%
Some other race	3.0%
American Indian/Alaska Native	1.2%
Hawaiian/Pacific Islander	0.1%

As of the 2020 United States Census, the racial and ethnic composition of Minnesota has become more diverse compared to the 2010 census.

=== White or European Americans ===
The state's population is predominantly White, making up approximately 77.5% of the total population (76.3% non-Hispanic Whites). This group primarily consists of individuals of Northern and Western European descent, with a significant proportion of residents claiming being German (the largest European ancestry), Norwegian, Irish, Swedish, and English ancestry. Among those 65 years and over, 92.4% are White.

=== Black or African Americans ===
African Americans are 7.0% of the population, a figure that has steadily increased over the past three decades. This growth is in part attributed to the influx of immigrants from East Africa, particularly Somalia and Ethiopia, who mainly reside in the Minneapolis–St. Paul metropolitan area.

=== Hispanic or Latino Americans ===
From 2000 to 2010, there was a significant increase in the Hispanic population by 74.5%, and this trend continued from 2010 to 2020. The state's Latino population exceeds 345,000, accounting for about 6% of the total population. Mexican origin residents form the largest group of Latinos in Minnesota, with a population of 213,800, making them the third largest cultural group in the state. Approximately 60% of Mexican Minnesotans reside in the 7-county Twin Cities metro area, with the remaining 40% spread across smaller cities and rural areas of the state.

=== Asian Americans ===
Asian Americans are 5.2% of the state's total. The Hmong community, originating from Southeast Asia has a significant presence in the Twin Cities metropolitan area.

=== Native Americans ===
Native Americans are 1.2% of the population. The two primary tribes in Minnesota are the Dakota (also known as the Sioux) and the Ojibwe (also known as the Chippewa or Anishinaabe). The Dakota are indigenous to the Minnesota region and were the state's earliest inhabitants. They traditionally lived in the southeastern part of the state, along the Mississippi and Minnesota rivers. The Dakota are divided into several bands, including the Mdewakanton, Sisseton, Wahpeton, and Wahpekute. Today, there are four Dakota communities in Minnesota: Shakopee Mdewakanton, Prairie Island Indian Community, Upper Sioux Community, and Lower Sioux Indian Community. The Ojibwe migrated to Minnesota from the east around the 17th century, settling primarily in the northern and central parts of the state. There are seven Ojibwe reservations in Minnesota today: Bois Forte, Fond du Lac, Grand Portage, Leech Lake, Mille Lacs, Red Lake, and White Earth.

=== Vital statistics ===
Year	Births	White (non-hispanic)		Black		Asian		American Indian		Hispanic/Latino (any race)	
Year	Births	Number	%	Number	%	Number	%	Number	%	Number	%
2014	69,904	50,332	72.0	8,033	11.5	5,669	8.1	1,428	2.0	4,678	6.7
2015	69,834	49,673	71.1	8,353	12.0	5,659	8.1	1,415	2.0	4,852	6.9
2016	69,749	48,534	69.6	7,781	11.1	5,367	7.7	1,059	1.5	4,871	7.0
2017	68,595	47,088	68.6	8,163	11.9	5,323	7.8	1,098	1.6	5,023	7.3
2018	67,344	46,014	68.3	8,207	12.2	5,298	7.9	1,040	1.5	4,991	7.4
2019	66,027	44,593	67.5	8,253	12.5	5,229	7.9	998	1.5	5,129	7.8
2020	63,443	42,099	66.4	8,074	12.7	5,026	7.9	873	1.4	5,320	8.4
2021	64,425	43,535	67.6	7,721	12.0	4,849	7.5	792	1.2	5,487	8.5
2022	64,015	42,246	66.0	7,923	12.4	4,931	7.7	774	1.2	6,040	9.4
2023	61,715	40,406	65.5	7,415	12.0	4,666	7.6	742	1.2	6,498	10.5
2024	62,110	40,026	64.4	7,310	11.8	4,660	7.5	716	1.1	7,235	11.6

=== Historical ===
The racial demographics of Minnesota have evolved considerably since the state's early settlement period. According to the United States Census data, the state's population in 1850 was 99.4% White, with a very small Black population of 0.6%, and virtually no representation of other racial groups.

This racial makeup largely remained consistent through the late 19th and early 20th centuries, with the White population consistently above 98% through 1940. Meanwhile, the Black and Native American populations fluctuated marginally, remaining below 1%. Asian and other races weren't distinctly represented in the census until the later part of the 19th century.

By 1950, the state began to see slight increases in racial diversity. The White population fell slightly to 99%, with a small increase in the Black population to 0.5%, and other racial groups beginning to be represented. It wasn't until the latter half of the 20th century that more notable changes occurred. By 1980, the White population had fallen to 96.6%, while the Black population had risen to 1.3%. In 1990, the racial composition continued to diversify, with the White population falling to 94.4%, and the Black population rising to 2.2%. The Asian population also increased to 1.8%, due in part to resettlement of some Hmong peoples following the Laotian Civil War.

Significant shifts in racial demographics were evident by the turn of the 21st century. By 2010, the White population was 85.3% and the Black population increased to 5.2%. The Asian population rose to 4%, and those identifying as two or more races rose to 2.4%. This trend was reflected in the 2020 census as well.

Year	Total	White		Black		Native		Asian (incl. Pacific Is.)		Other race		Two or more	
Year	Total	Number	%	Number	%	Number	%	Number	%	Number	%	Number	%
1850	6,077	6,038	99.4	39	0.6								
1860	172,023	169,395	98.5	259	0.2	2,369	1.4						
1870	439,706	438,257	99.7	759	0.2	690	0.2						
1880	780,773	776,884	99.5	1,564	0.2	2,300	0.3	25	0.0				
1890	1,301,826	1,296,159	98.9	3,683	0.3	10,096	0.8	96	0.0				
1900	1,751,394	1,737,036	99.2	4,959	0.3	9,182	0.5	217	0.0				
1910	2,075,708	2,059,227	99.2	7,084	0.3	9,182	0.4	344	0.0				
1920	2,387,125	2,368,936	99.2	8,809	0.4	8,761	0.4	619	0.0				
1930	2,563,953	2,542,599	99.2	9,445	0.4	11,077	0.4	832	0.0				
1940	2,792,300	2,768,982	99.2	9,928	0.4	12,528	0.4	862	0.0				
1950	2,982,483	2,953,697	99.0	14,022	0.5	12,533	0.4	2,061	0.1	170	0.0		
1960	3,413,864	3,371,603	98.8	22,263	0.7	15,496	0.5	3,642	0.1	860	0.0		
1970	3,804,971	3,736,038	98.2	34,868	0.9	23,128	0.6	7,605	0.2	3,332	0.1		
1980	4,075,970	3,935,770	96.6	53,344	1.3	35,016	0.9	26,536	0.7	25,304	0.7		
1990	4,375,099	4,130,395	94.4	94,944	2.2	49,909	1.1	77,886	1.8	21,965	0.5		
2000	4,919,479	4,400,282	89.4	171,731	3.5	54,967	1.1	143,946	2.9	65,810	1.3	82,742	1.7
2010	5,303,925	4,524,062	85.3	274,412	5.2	60,916	1.2	216,390	4.0	103,000	1.9	125,145	2.4
2020	5,706,494	4,423,146	77.5	398,434	7.0	68,641	1.2	302,108	5.3	168,444	3.0	345,721	6.1

== Native American tribes ==
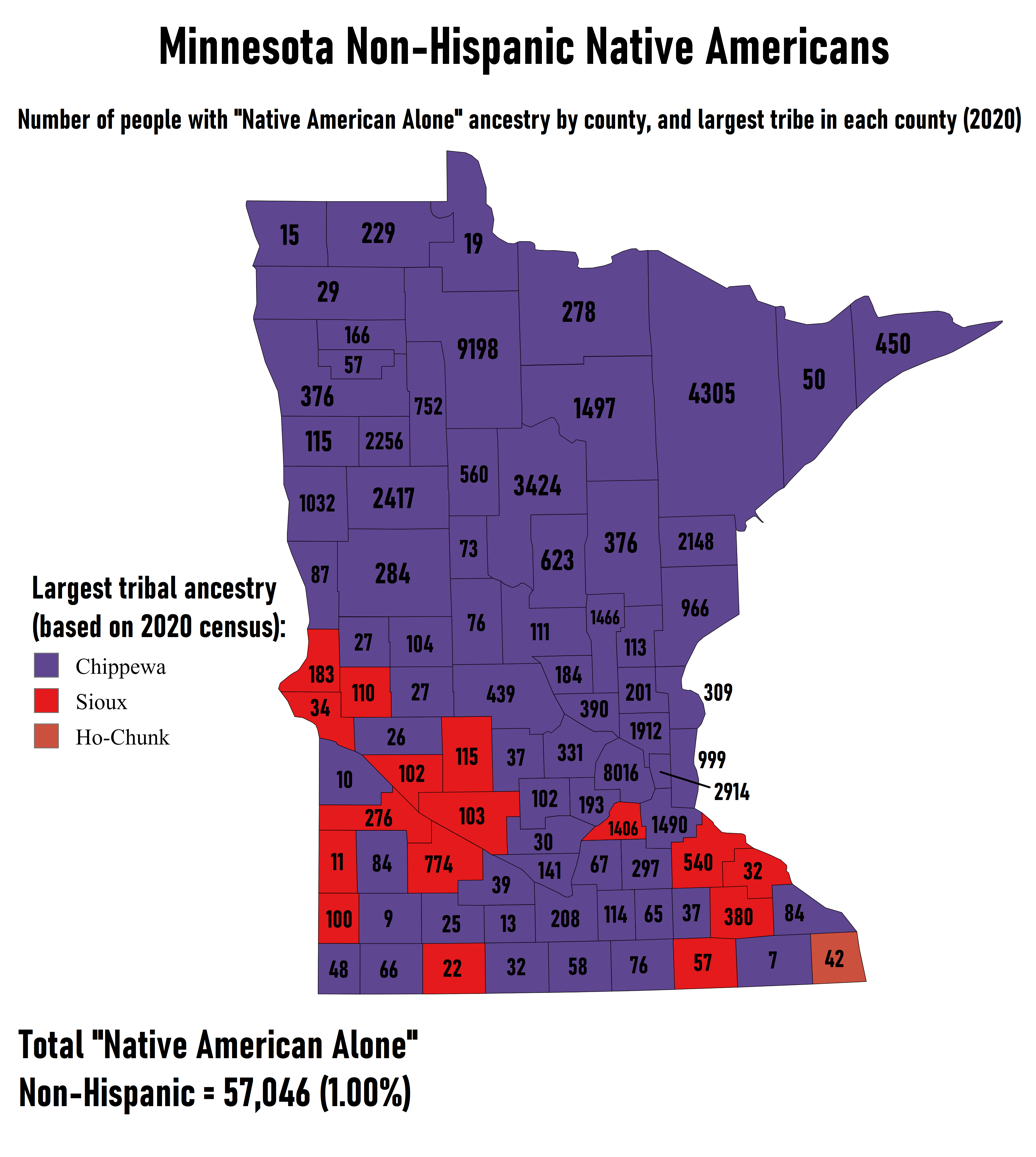
Largest Non-Hispanic Native American ancestry by county and numbers of people reporting "Native American Alone"

What is now Minnesota has been historically inhabited at various times by the following tribes: the Chippewa (Ojibwe), the Sioux, the Iowa, the Otoe, the Arapaho, the Cheyenne, the Foxes, the Missouri, the Sauk, the Omaha, the Ponca and the Ho-Chunk (this last tribe from 1848 to 1863). Today the largest Native American peoples in Minnesota are the Chippewa and the Sioux, as shown by the map.

== Immigration ==
Immigration to Minnesota was fueled by the efforts of railroad companies and civic boosters who published books explaining Minnesota's virtues. New Minnesotans also sent letters back to the "old country" explaining the new hope and prosperity they had found in Minnesota. The first major wave of immigrants, in the 1850s through 1870s, was primarily from Germany and Ireland. The Irish immigrants settled in Minnesota as early as 1851, escaping from the Great Famine of Ireland. Most settlers moved to farming areas in the central and southern regions of the state. Germans composed the largest immigrant group to Minnesota. When World War I started, 70% of the population was either foreign-born or had at least one parent born outside the United States. Of that number, more than one fourth were Germans. New Ulm, Saint Cloud, and Shakopee were particular centers of German immigration. Scandinavians from Norway, Sweden, and Denmark, as well as immigrants from the Nordic country of Finland soon followed, but they tended to settle in distinctive communities of Norwegian, Swedish, Danish, and Finnish groups instead of common Scandinavian or Nordic communities.

Foreign born population by birthplace

Irish immigrants were the fourth largest group after the Germans, Swedes, and Norwegians, many of whom came as a result of the Great Famine. Reportedly, they were encouraged to immigrate by Archbishop John Ireland. The Irish concentrated in Saint Paul. Other Europeans from Italy, Slovenia, Poland, Czech Republic/ Bohemia, and Slovakia became the dominant group immigrating to the United States, and they tended to settle in the Twin Cities, Duluth, and the Iron Range. The Mesabi Range was especially popular among southeastern Europeans, particularly Slovenians and other Central European immigrants from the former Habsburg Empire, who found employment in the iron mines. With extraordinary encouragement from Walter Mondale, Hmong and Vietnamese immigrants started to come to Minnesota around the mid-1970s as the pro-American governments in their home countries collapsed. Many came through VOLAGS contracted with the State Department, who helped them settle in. As of the 2015 American Community Survey, there are a number residents from Laos and Thailand in the state, which include individuals of Hmong ancestry.

In the mid-1990s, Somali immigrants began to settle in the United States as political turmoil occurred in Somalia; Minnesota became one of the prime destinations. According to the Office of Immigration Statistics, in 1996, 439 people came directly from Somalia to Minnesota, but the office estimates many more first arrived in other states and moved to Minnesota. In 2002, official estimates put the statewide population at around 15,000 residents. Many came through VOLAGS, who helped them settle. As of the 2015 American Community Survey (ACS), there are 57,000 residents in the state who are of Somali ancestry. The 2018-2022 5-year ACS estimate put the population at about 82,000, 58.0% of which were foreign-born.

One of the fastest growing immigrant groups in Minnesota is the Karen people, an ethnic minority in conflict with the government in Myanmar. Most of the estimated 5,000 Karen in Minnesota came from refugee camps in Thailand. Many also arrived through VOLAGS.

As of the 2015 American Community Survey, the largest foreign-born groups in Minnesota are from Mexico (67,300), Somalia (31,400), India (30,500), Laos including Hmong (23,300), Vietnam (20,200), China excluding Hong Kong and Taiwan (19,900), Ethiopia (19,300), and Thailand including Hmong (16,800).

In 2019, 1,104 refugees were settled in Minnesota. The most common countries of origin of refugees were Myanmar (392), Democratic Republic of the Congo (156), Ukraine (114), Somalia (109), and Ethiopia (85). In 2022, the state reported that 43% of refugees were from Ukraine, 33% from Afghanistan, and 6% from Somalia.

Immigrants and Minnesota-born to immigrant parents, by country or ethnic group of origin, over 10,000
Country	2007-2011	2017-2021
Mexico	105,450	95,227
Somalia	33,296	76,658
Hmong people	51,268	55,005
India	28,941	39,559
Ethiopia	16,234	36,982
China	16,289	24,353
Vietnam	22,588	22,283
Liberia	16,286	20,168
South Korea	20,087	20,126
Canada	17,633	18,804
Kenya	5,977	16,823
Myanmar	4,563	15,679
Philippines	10,006	13,544
Russia	9,784	12,787
El Salvador	9,457	12,137

=== Foreign-born population ===
Minnesota has seen a fluctuating percentage of foreign-born residents throughout its history. In the mid-19th century, a large portion of the state's population was foreign-born, with 32.5% in 1850 and 36.5% in 1870. However, from the late 19th to the mid-20th century, this percentage steadily declined, reaching a low of 2.6% between 1970 and 1990.

This trend reversed in the late 20th and early 21st centuries. The proportion of foreign-born residents began to increase again, more than doubling from 2.6% in 1990 to 5.3% in 2000. As of 2017-2021, the foreign-born population in Minnesota was 482,613. Native-born children (age 0-17) with at least one foreign-born parent numbered 227,200, while foreign-born children in the same age range with native-born parents were 7,549. The majority of the foreign-born population resided in the Twin Cities 7-county region (381,200), with the remainder in Greater Minnesota (101,413). Regarding the length of time in the U.S., 19.5% had been in the country for 0-5 years, 14.2% for 6-10 years, 14.4% for 11-15 years, 15.1% for 16-20 years, and 36.8% for 21+ years. In terms of English language proficiency, 4.8% did not speak English, 13.9% spoke English but not well, and 81.3% spoke English well, very well, or only spoke English.

=== Workforce participation ===
The workforce participation in Minnesota among foreign-born adults has changed since the 1990s. From 1990 to 2021, the proportion of working adults aged 16 to 64 who were foreign-born increased steadily, from 63.6% to 76.5%. In 1990, 51,758 foreign-born adults were employed, which escalated to 305,397 by 2021. The civilian population of foreign-born adults in this age group also saw an increase, growing from 81,443 in 1990 to 399,471 in 2021.

The workforce participation of specific immigrant groups shows notable trends from 2007 to 2021. For example, among the Somali population, workforce participation rose from 46.7% to 67.3%, with the foreign-born population aged 16 to 64 growing from 18,347 to 37,424. Similarly, Mexican immigrants saw an increase in workforce participation, from 70.8% to 78.7%, although their numbers in this age group decreased from 61,282 to 51,037. The Hmong community saw an increase in workforce participation from 61.6% to 73.6%. Ethiopian immigrants also experienced a growth in workforce participation, from 75.5% to 78.3%, alongside a significant increase in their population in this age bracket, from 10,739 to 18,784.

For Ecuadorians, while there was a high level of workforce participation at 81.6%, it slightly decreased to 75.9% over time. However, their population in the workforce age range grew from 4,912 to 7,235. Canadian immigrants in Minnesota displayed a similar trend, with a high initial workforce participation rate of 80.1% that decreased to 75.4%, and their population increased from 8,066 to 9,038.

Kenyan immigrants maintained a high level of workforce participation, slightly decreasing from 83.4% to 81.5%. Notably, their population nearly tripled, growing from 3,689 to 9,290. Indian immigrants in Minnesota showed an upward trend in workforce participation, from 73.5% to 82.5%, with their population increasing from 19,342 to 25,488. Lastly, Chinese immigrants experienced an increase in workforce participation from 67.3% to 74.0%, with their population nearly doubling from 8,121 to 15,083.

== Language ==
=== Historical ===
Prior to European contact, the region now known as Minnesota was inhabited by various indigenous groups who spoke their own diverse languages. Among the major Native American tribes, the Anishinaabe (also known as the Ojibwe or Chippewa) spoke Anishinaabemowin and the Dakota (part of the Sioux Nation) spoke Dakota, both of which belong to distinct language families, Algic and Siouan respectively. These languages had a significant influence on Minnesota’s linguistic landscape, and many places in the state, such as Minnehaha and Minnetonka, still bear names of Dakota or Anishinaabe origin.

French explorers and fur traders in the 17th and 18th centuries introduced the French language to Minnesota. Although French's influence diminished following British and then American governance, its legacy is preserved in the names of cities such as Detroit Lakes and Saint Cloud, as well as in the state's name itself, which is derived from the Dakota word for "clear blue water".

The immigration waves of the 19th and early 20th centuries brought a large influx of speakers of German, Norwegian, and Swedish, making these three languages prominent among Minnesota's non-English-speaking residents. Many immigrants retained their native languages, leading to the establishment of German, Norwegian, and Swedish language newspapers, churches, and schools.

In 1940, the following were the most common mother tongues in Minnesota, along with the number of speakers and the percentage of the population they represented:

- English - 1,797,520 (64.87%)
- German - 293,560 (10.59%)
- Norwegian - 193,340 (6.98%)
- Swedish - 164,560 (5.94%)
- Finnish - 50,240 (1.81%)
- Polish - 40,880 (1.48%)
- Czech - 28,700 (1.04%)
- French - 23,400 (0.84%)
- Danish - 22,620 (0.82%)
- Slovenian - 13,920 (0.5%)
- Italian - 12,619 (0.46%)
- Yiddish - 12,300 (0.44%)
- Dutch - 11,980 (0.43%)
- Russian - 7,380 (0.27%)
- Others - 22,981 (0.83%)
- Not reported - 74,860 (2.7%)
- Total - 2,770,860 (100%)

=== Modern ===
As of the 21st century, English remains the most widely spoken language in Minnesota, followed by Spanish, Hmong, and Somali. This reflects more recent immigration trends, which have brought large numbers of Latin American, Southeast Asian (particularly Hmong from Laos), and East African (especially Somali) immigrants to the state.

The Somali language, in particular, has seen substantial growth due to Minnesota having the largest Somali diaspora in the United States. This has led to the emergence of Somali-language media and the offering of Somali language classes in some schools.

Although the use of Scandinavian languages has significantly declined as compared to the historical peak, it is not uncommon to find older generations and communities that still retain some use and knowledge of these languages, particularly in rural areas. In Minneapolis, the American Swedish Institute provides Swedish and Finnish language courses, reflecting the continued interest and preservation of these linguistic traditions.

Native American languages, such as Dakota and Ojibwe, are less commonly spoken today. In the state, there were five first-language Dakota speakers alive as of 2022, all over the age of 67. However, revitalization efforts have had some success, with 33% of community members learning or speaking Dakota in 2022, a 20% increase from 2019. Some schools and colleges offer classes in these languages, and there are initiatives to promote their use among the younger generation of Native Americans.

In the year 2020, about 9 in 10 of Minnesota's population 5 years and over spoke only English at home. The remaining spoke a language other than English at home.

Language Spoken at Home
Language Spoken at Home	2005		2010		2015		2021	
Language Spoken at Home	Number	%	Number	%	Number	%	Number	%
English	4,521,613	90.99%	4,789,090	90.18%	4,906,264	89.37%	5,064,113	88.73%
Spanish	167,820	3.38%	194,267	3.66%	194,040	3.53%	200,375	3.51%
Hmong	44,055	0.89%	52,936	1.07%	61,380	1.12%	75,275	1.32%
Somali/Oromo	17,376	0.35%	33,731	0.68%	54,732	1%	74,320	1.3%
Vietnamese	18,027	0.36%	24,374	0.46%	23,782	0.43%	20,298	0.36%
Chinese	11,939	0.24%	17,874	0.34%	19,167	0.35%	17,637	0.31%
Karen	–	–	–	–	–	–	16,536	0.29%
German	25,345	0.51%	25,290	0.48%	22,784	0.46%	16,231	0.28%
French	16,238	0.33%	13,279	0.25%	16,372	0.3%	14,396	0.25%
Arabic	5,788	0.12%	8,624	0.16%	16,510	0.3%	13,402	0.23%
Russian	10,544	0.21%	15,640	0.29%	14,617	0.27%	12,875	0.23%
Amharic	10,594	0.21%	6,336	0.12%	8,600	0.16%	12,440	0.22%
Hindi	5,587	0.11%	8,601	0.16%	9,369	0.17%	9,461	0.17%
Scandinavian	6,882	0.14%	10,241	0.19%	4,406	0.08%	4,004	0.07%
Finnish	4,655	0.09%	2,760	0.05%	1,914	0.03%	2,831	0.05%
Other	102,689	2.07%	107,541	2.03%	135,657	2.47%	153,196	2.68%
Total	4,969,152	100%	5,310,584	100%	5,489,594	100%	5,707,390	100%

== Religion ==
Religious affiliation in Minnesota (2014)
1. Lutheranism (27.0%)
2. Other Protestants (24.0%)
3. Catholic Church (22.0%)
4. Mormon (1.00%)
5. Other Christians (1.00%)
6. Judaism (1.00%)
7. Islam (1.00%)
8. Other/unspecified (3.00%)
9. Unaffiliated (20.0%)

The religious landscape of Minnesota is diverse and has evolved significantly over the state's history. Historically, the first religious influences in Minnesota were the spiritual practices of Native American tribes, such as the Dakota and Ojibwe, which centered on nature and ancestral spirits. The first Christian influence in the area came from Catholic missionaries in the 17th and 18th centuries, who worked to convert Native American tribes.

The largest influx of religious influences came with the European settlers in the 19th century. Protestant Christian denominations, particularly Lutheranism, took root with the arrival of Scandinavian immigrants. The Lutheran Church remains a significant presence in Minnesota, particularly the Evangelical Lutheran Church in America (ELCA), the largest Lutheran body in the United States, as well as the Lutheran Church–Missouri Synod.

Irish immigrants brought Catholicism to the state, and it remains a major faith tradition. The Archdiocese of Saint Paul and Minneapolis serves a significant Catholic population. The first bishop of this archdiocese, John Ireland, was a notable figure in the late 19th and early 20th century, advocating for progressive education and immigrants' rights.

In the 20th and 21st centuries, Minnesota has seen growth in other Christian denominations, such as Methodists, Baptists, and Eastern Orthodox, as well as non-Christian religions. Immigration from Southeast Asia has led to the establishment of Buddhist and Hmong religious communities, while immigration from the Middle East and Somalia has contributed to the growth of the Muslim population. Additionally, Minnesota is home to a sizable Jewish community with a history dating back to the late 19th century.

Minnesota also has a growing number of people who identify as non-religious, in line with national trends. The Pew Research Center's Religious Landscape Study showed that as of 2014, 20% of Minnesotans identified as unaffiliated with any religion, a category encompassing atheists, agnostics, and those who do not identify with any particular religion.

Current statistics indicate a diverse religious composition in Minnesota. According to the Pew Research Center, as of 2014, 74% of Minnesotans identified as Christian, broken down into 28% Evangelical Protestant, 22% Mainline Protestant, 22% Catholic, and 2% Historically Black Protestant. 27% of Minnesotans identify as Lutheran. Non-Christian faiths, including Judaism, Islam, Buddhism, and Hinduism, represented 5% of the population. As previously mentioned, 20% of the population identified as religiously unaffiliated.

== Education ==
Minnesota ranks near the top in terms of an educated populace, boasting that 91.3% of adult residents 25 years or older have achieved a high school diploma, and 31.4% have earned a bachelor's degree or higher. In fall 2010, approximately 71 percent of Minnesota high school graduates enrolled in a postsecondary institution the fall following graduation. The number of high school graduates in Minnesota is projected to decline over the next seven years from 65,073 in 2010 to 59,727 by 2017, a drop of 5,346 students. The number of nonwhite graduates is projected to grow by 4,713 students, from 16 percent of all graduates in 2010 to 23 percent of all graduates in 13 years. During the same period, the number of white graduates is projected to decline 12 percent, or by 6,511 students. Many Minnesota adults pursue higher education in one of the state-supported colleges or Universities. These include those in the University of Minnesota system, which had 68,418 enrollees in 2012, and MnSCU which had 433,639 students in the 09-10 school year.

== Occupation ==
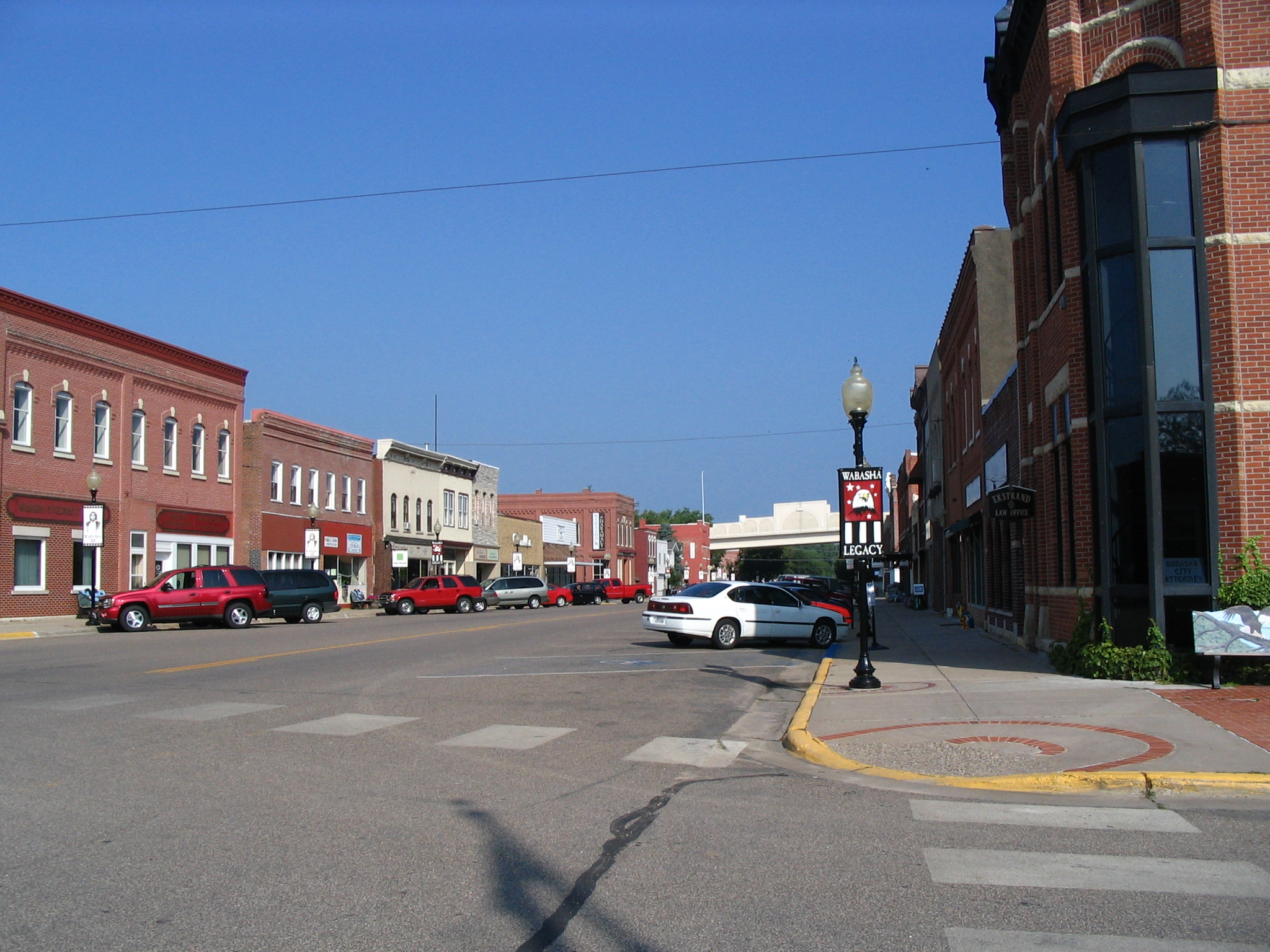
Wabasha—a typical small-town streetscape

The state continues to transform from an agricultural and natural resource-based economy to a high-tech and financial services-based one. Minnesota ranks 2nd in the nation, with 72.2% of adults in the labor force and 5.5% are unemployed. Occupations estimated in 2005 are:

- Management/professional 36.0%
- Sales and other office 26.0%
- Service 15.0%
- Manufacturing/production/transportation 13.0%
- Construction/mining/maintenance/repair 9.0%
- Farming/logging/fishing 1.0%

Veterans of the armed forces account for 10.8% of the adult population, which is 40th in the nation. Adults with disabilities total 12.2% of the population.

== Income ==
In 2011 the three-year average median household income in the state was $56,869, 12th highest statewide average in the nation. In contrast, 9.8% of individuals live below the poverty line, ranking 44th in the nation.

== Housing ==
Statewide, there are a total of 2,470,483 housing units, with 90.2% occupied and 9.8% vacant (including seasonal units). The majority of occupied units are owner-occupied (65.2%), with an average household size of 2.6, while renter-occupied units constitute 25.0% of the total, with an average household size of 2.1. A significant portion of housing (40.4%) was built between 1970-1999. The median rent paid, as of 2021, is $1,081. Over a quarter of Minnesota households spend more than 30% of their income on housing costs. This burden is particularly pronounced among renters, with nearly half (46.0%) being cost-burdened.

In terms of household composition, family households make up 63.5%, with 29.5% having children under 18. Single-person family households account for 13.5%, and nonfamily households constitute 36.5%. Of these, 28.8% are householders living alone, with 11.5% aged 65 years and over.

=== Home ownership ===
Homeownership rates exhibit a significant racial disparity. While over three-quarters (77.3%) of White households own their homes, the rate drops to about half (48.6%) for households of color. This 28.8 percentage point gap is larger than the national average.

=== Homelessness ===
Since 1984, Wilder Research has been conducting comprehensive studies on homelessness in Minnesota. The first study in 1984 identified middle-aged men, predominantly people of color, as the majority of shelter residents, with alcoholism and mental illness being significant but not universal issues.

Over the years, the demographics of homelessness have broadened. The 2012 study highlighted that women and children now form a large portion of the homeless population. Notably, many parents among the homeless had also experienced homelessness as children. The study revealed that homelessness affects African-Americans and American Indians disproportionately.

In 2023, a one-night count identified 10,522 homeless people living in the state, a 7% decrease from the last count in 2018. The homeless population has grown significantly since 1991, when it was estimated at 3,079.

== Marital status ==
The average adult Minnesotan is married, although the numbers are shrinking. In 2007, 53.7% of Minnesotans over the age of 15 were married. People who were widowed made up 5.5% and people who were divorced made up 9.5%. People who were separated made up a mere 1.2% and people who were never married made up the remaining 30.1%. In the year 2005, 56.0% of people aged over 15 were married and people who were never married made up 28.6%. This shows that the percentage of people who are married is declining while the percentage of people who have never been married is on the rise.
