= Henry J. Gjertsen =

American politician (1861–1911)

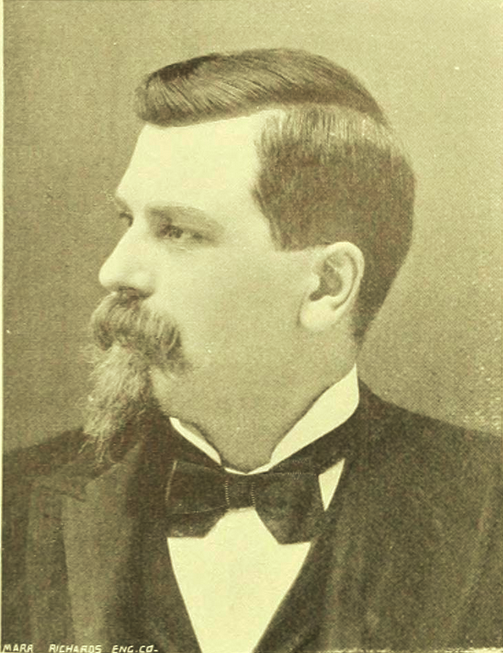
Henry J. Gjertsen

Henry J. Gjertsen (October 8, 1861 – December 2, 1911) was a Norwegian-born American lawyer of Minneapolis and Minnesota state senator who was interested in civic and political affairs. He never specialized in any particular branch of the law but continued in general practice. In addition to being admitted to the state bar, he was admitted to practice in the Supreme Court of the United States.

== Early life and education ==
Henry John Gjertsen was born October 8, 1861, near the city of Tromsø, Norway. His parents were Herman J. and Albertina V. (Wulf) Gjertsen, the latter a native of the same place. Herman J. Gjertsen was a native of Bergen, Norway, son of a business man of that city, and the family is, according to Overland's History of Norway, descended from the King of Mandal, one of the old kingdoms of which Norway was later composed. Like many of the inhabitants of Bergen, Herman J. Gjertsen was a sailor and navigator, and for many years, commanded a brig plying between Nordland and Bergen. He was also engaged to some extent in farming. In 1868, he removed with his family to the U.S. and settled in Hennepin County, Minnesota, in what is now a part of the city of Minneapolis. He was there engaged in farming, and died April 22, 1905. The farm continued to be held by the family, being situated on the east side of Lake Amelia. Mr. Gjertsen and wife were Lutherans in religion, associated with the Hauges Synod. While he was an earnest supporter of the Republican principles, he did not attempt to take any part in public affairs. This was, in fact, largely precluded by his age at the time of arrival in the U.S.. Henry had eight siblings: Nels H., John C., Eli O., Lewis C., Sarah, Emma, Sophia, and George H. Gjertsen was six years old when the family came to the U.S.

Gjertsen's early education was obtained in the district school in Richfield, Minnesota, where his father was engaged in farming. He grew up on the farm until he was 20, working on the farm during the summer season and attending school in the winter. In this way, he prepared for the Minneapolis high school which he also attended for a time. Subsequently, he took a six years' term in the collegiate department of the Hauges Seminary at Red Wing, Minnesota, a theological institution, graduating in 1881. His parents had destined him for the ministry, but after completing his collegiate course, he immediately took up the study of law with Judge Lang, of Minneapolis, and was admitted to the bar at the age of 23, in 1884, passing an examination before Judge Lochren.

== Career ==
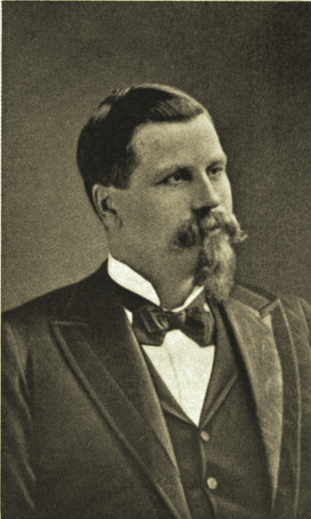
undated

For some time, he engaged in the practice of his profession alone, and was subsequently associated with Robert Christensen and afterwards with L. M. Rand. In 1904, he formed a partnership with Harry A. Lund, under the style of Gjertsen & Lund. They carried on a general practice before all the courts and occupied a leading position among the attorneys of the state.

Gjertsen was appointed a member of the First Charter Commission of Minneapolis, on which he served two years. He was subsequently appointed inspector general on the staff of Governor Lind, and was judge advocate general under Governor Van Zant. On January 1, 1902, he became a member of the State Senate and served in that capacity for four years.

Gjertsen was an active supporter of Republican policies and his counsel was often sought by his colleagues in the management of party affairs. He was a member of the State and National Bar Associations and with numerous York Rite Masonic bodies, being a member of the Mystic Shrine. He was a Past-Chancellor of the local lodge, Knights of Pythias, and a member of the B. P. O. E., of the Sons of Norway, the Commercial Club, and the Odin Club, the latter being a prominent Scandinavian club. He was president of the Pacific Coast & Norway Packing Company, of Petersburg, Alaska, which operated a saw mill and general store, and was very extensively engaged in the packing of salmon for the market.

== Personal life ==
On January 4, 1883, Gjertsen married Gretchen Goebel, who was born February 22, 1862, at Frankfort-am-Main, Germany, a daughter of Kaspar and Elizabeth Goebel, both representatives of old families of Frankfort. They had one child, Beatrice, who was a student of music in Germany and completed her musical education by making her debut as "Elizabeth” in Tannhäuser (Richard Wagner) with the Royal Opera in Weimar in February, 1909, with the result that she was immediately engaged as leading dramatic soprano for a period of five years at Hof Opera in Weimar.

After his emigration to the U.S., Gjertsen remained a resident of Minnesota the rest of his life. He died December 2, 1911.
