= Office of Immigration Statistics =

The Office of Immigration Statistics (OIS) is an agency of the United States Department of Homeland Security that operates under the Office of Strategy, Policy, and Plans.

Since the passage of the Homeland Security Act in 2002, the United States Department of Homeland Security's Office of Immigration Statistics has been responsible for carrying out two statutory requirements: 1) To collect and disseminate to Congress and the public any data or information useful in evaluating the social, economic, environmental, and demographic impact of immigration laws; and 2) To establish standards of reliability and validity for immigration statistics collected by the department's operational components.

== Introduction ==
Located within the Department of Homeland Security's Office of Strategy, Policy, and Plans and focused on data collection and analysis, the Office of Immigration Statistics (OIS) is positioned to gather information from across the department and the entire federal government and to perform these centralizing analytic and dissemination functions.

== History ==
Immigration reporting began with the "Steerage" (or "Passenger") Act of March 2, 1819, which required the Secretary of State to report to each session of Congress on the age, sex, occupation, and origins of passengers on arriving vessels. The Department of State performed these duties until the early 1870s, after which responsibility shifted to the Treasury Department's Bureau of Statistics, followed by the Department of Commerce and Labor in 1903, and then the Department of Labor in 1913. The Immigration and Naturalization Service (INS) was transferred from the Department of Labor to the Department of Justice in 1940, where it resided until 2003, when the components of INS were subsumed under the Department of Homeland Security (DHS).

Section 103 of the Immigration and Nationality Act of 1952 establishes OIS's modern mandate: in consultation with interested academics, government agencies, and other parties, to provide Congress and the public, on an annual basis, with information about immigration and the impact of immigration laws. Section 701 of the Homeland Security Act of 2002 transferred these duties from the Statistics Branch of the Office of Policy and Planning of the INS to the DHS Undersecretary for Management and charged OIS with establishing standards of reliability and validity for immigration statistics. OIS currently sits within DHS's Office of Strategy, Policy, and Plans, and collects data from DHS's various operational Components, including U.S. Customs and Border Protection (CBP), U.S. Immigration and Customs Enforcement (ICE), and U.S. Citizenship and Immigration Services (USCIS), as well as from other Federal agencies such as the Department of Justice, the Department of State, and the U.S. Census Bureau.

== Core reports ==
=== The Yearbook of Immigration Statistics ===
The Yearbook of Immigration Statistics is a compendium of tables that provides data on foreign nationals who, during a fiscal year, were granted lawful permanent residence (i.e., admitted as immigrants or became legal permanent residents), were admitted into the United States on a temporary basis (e.g., tourists, students, or workers), applied for asylum or refugee status, or were naturalized. The Yearbook also presents data on immigration enforcement actions, including alien apprehensions, removals, and returns.

=== Lawful Permanent Residents (LPRs) ===
The Office of Immigration Statistics (OIS) Annual Flow Reports on LPRs contain information obtained from foreign nationals' applications for LPR status on the number and characteristics of persons who became LPRs during a given fiscal year.

=== Refugees and asylees ===
The Office of Immigration Statistics (OIS) Annual Flow Reports on refugees and asylees contain information obtained from the Worldwide Refugee Admissions Processing System (WRAPS) of the Bureau of Population, Refugees, and Migration of the U.S. Department of State on the numbers and demographic profiles of persons admitted to the United States as refugees, and those applying for and granted asylum status during a given fiscal year.

=== Naturalizations ===
The Office of Immigration Statistics (OIS) Annual Flow Reports on naturalization contain information obtained from naturalization applications on the number and characteristics of persons aged 18 years and older who became naturalized US citizens during a given fiscal year.

=== Nonimmigrant Admissions ===
The Office of Immigration Statistics (OIS) Annual Flow Reports on nonimmigrants contain information obtained from I-94 arrival records on the number and characteristics of nonimmigrant admissions to the United States during a given fiscal year.

=== Immigration Enforcement Actions ===
The Office of Immigration Statistics (OIS) annual Immigration Enforcement Actions reports contain information obtained from CBP and ICE case records and processed by OIS to describe the number and characteristics of foreign nationals found inadmissible, apprehended, arrested, detained, returned, or removed during a given fiscal year.

=== Population estimates ===
The Office of Immigration Statistics occasionally publishes population estimates of a particular subgroup. Population estimates take information on immigration flows and may combine it with other counts or estimates, such as those in the U.S. Census Bureau's American Community Survey (ACS), as well as demographic life expectancy tables to give an idea of population size and characteristics in a given year. Terminology, data sources, and methodology may have shifted over time. Current series include population estimates for unauthorized immigrants, nonimmigrants, and lawful permanent residents.
