= Carlton C. Qualey =

Carlton Qualey
- Born: Carlton Chester Qualey; December 17, 1904; Spring Grove, Minnesota, U.S.
- Died: March 25, 1988 (aged 83); Minneapolis, Minnesota, U.S.
- Children: 2

Academic background
- Education: St. Olaf College (BA); University of Minnesota (MA); Columbia University (PhD)

Academic work
- Discipline: History
- Sub-discipline: Norwegian-American immigration
