= Spring Grove, Minnesota =

City in Minnesota, United States

Spring Grove
- City
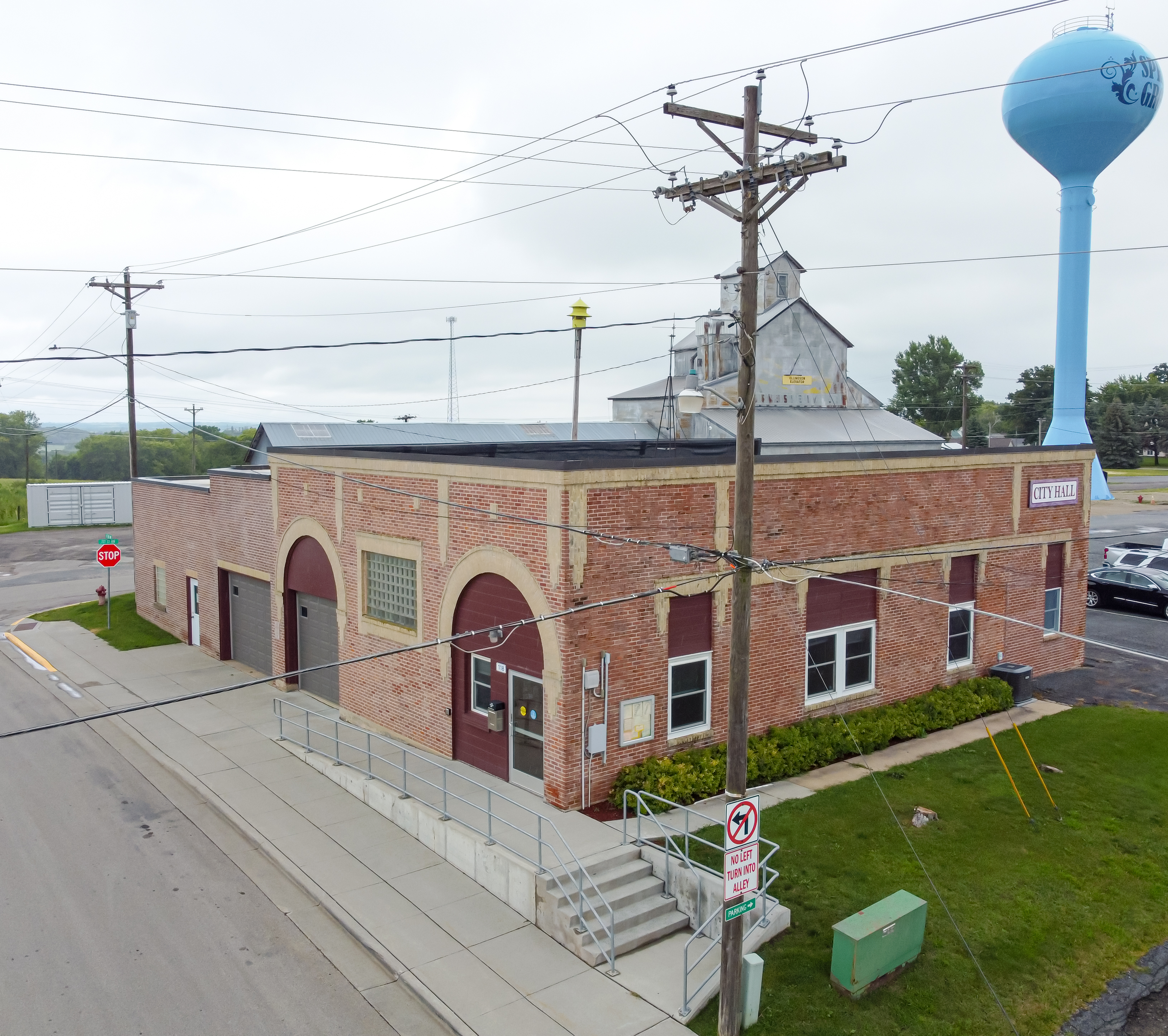
- Motto: "pretty. neat. small town."
- Location of Spring Grove, Minnesota
- Coordinates: 43°33′40″N 91°38′14″W
- Country: United States
- State: Minnesota
- County: Houston

Government
  - Mayor: Saundra Solum

Area
  - Total: 1.00 sq mi (2.58 km^{2})
  - Land: 0.99 sq mi (2.57 km^{2})
  - Water: 0 sq mi (0.00 km^{2})
- Elevation: 1,322 ft (403 m)

Population (2020)
  - Total: 1,256
  - Density: 1,263.6/sq mi (487.88/km^{2})
- Time zone: UTC-6 (Central (CST))
  - Summer (DST): UTC-5 (CDT)
- ZIP code: 55974
- Area code: 507
- FIPS code: 27-61852
- GNIS feature ID: 2395931
- Website: www.springgrovemn.com

Spring Grove is a city in Houston County, Minnesota, United States. As of the 2020 census, Spring Grove had a population of 1,256. It is part of the La Crosse-Onalaska, WI-MN Metropolitan Statistical Area.

== History ==
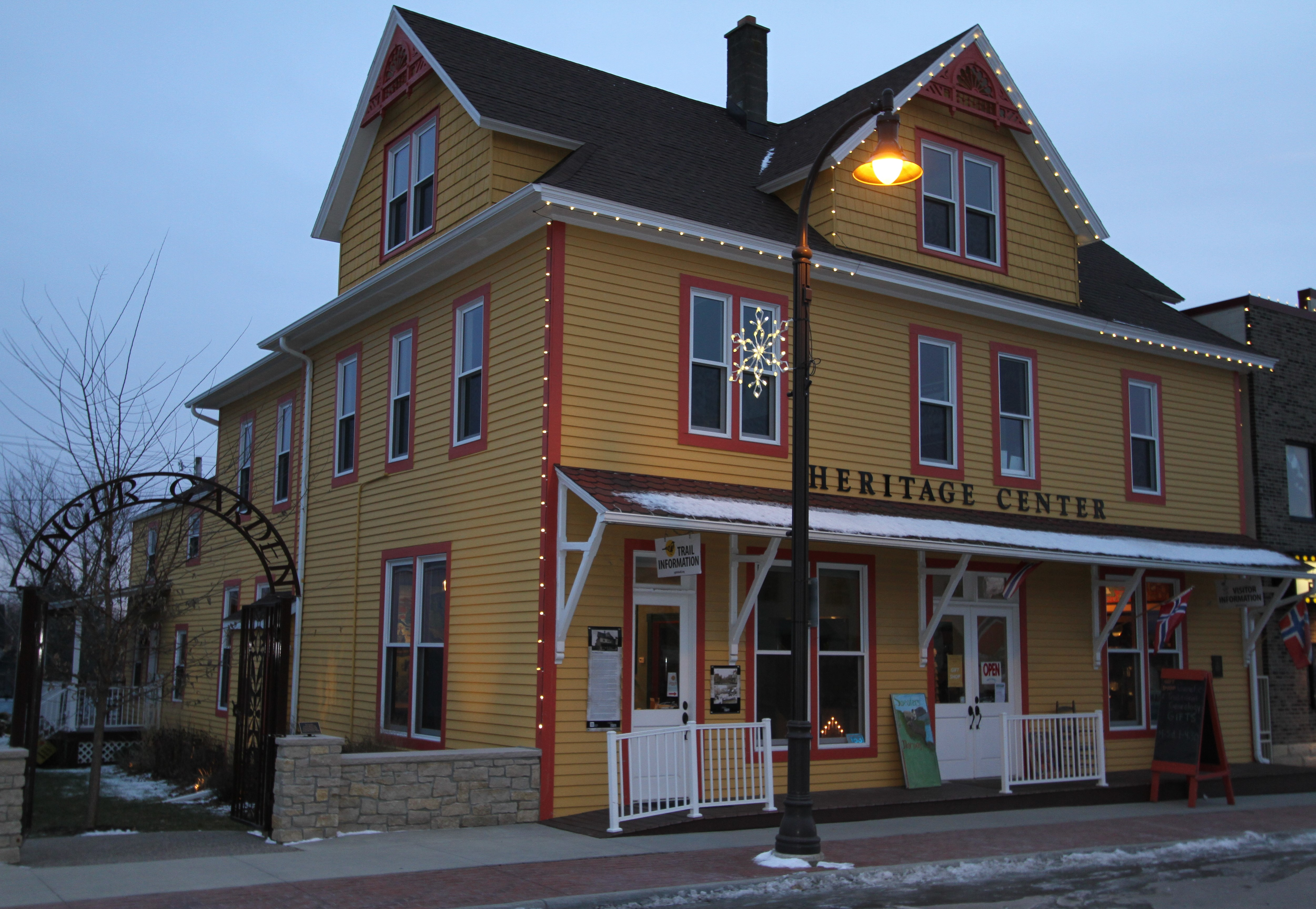
Giants of the Earth Heritage Center in Spring Grove

A post office has been in operation at Spring Grove since 1855. The community was named for a spring and a grove near the original town site.

== Geography ==
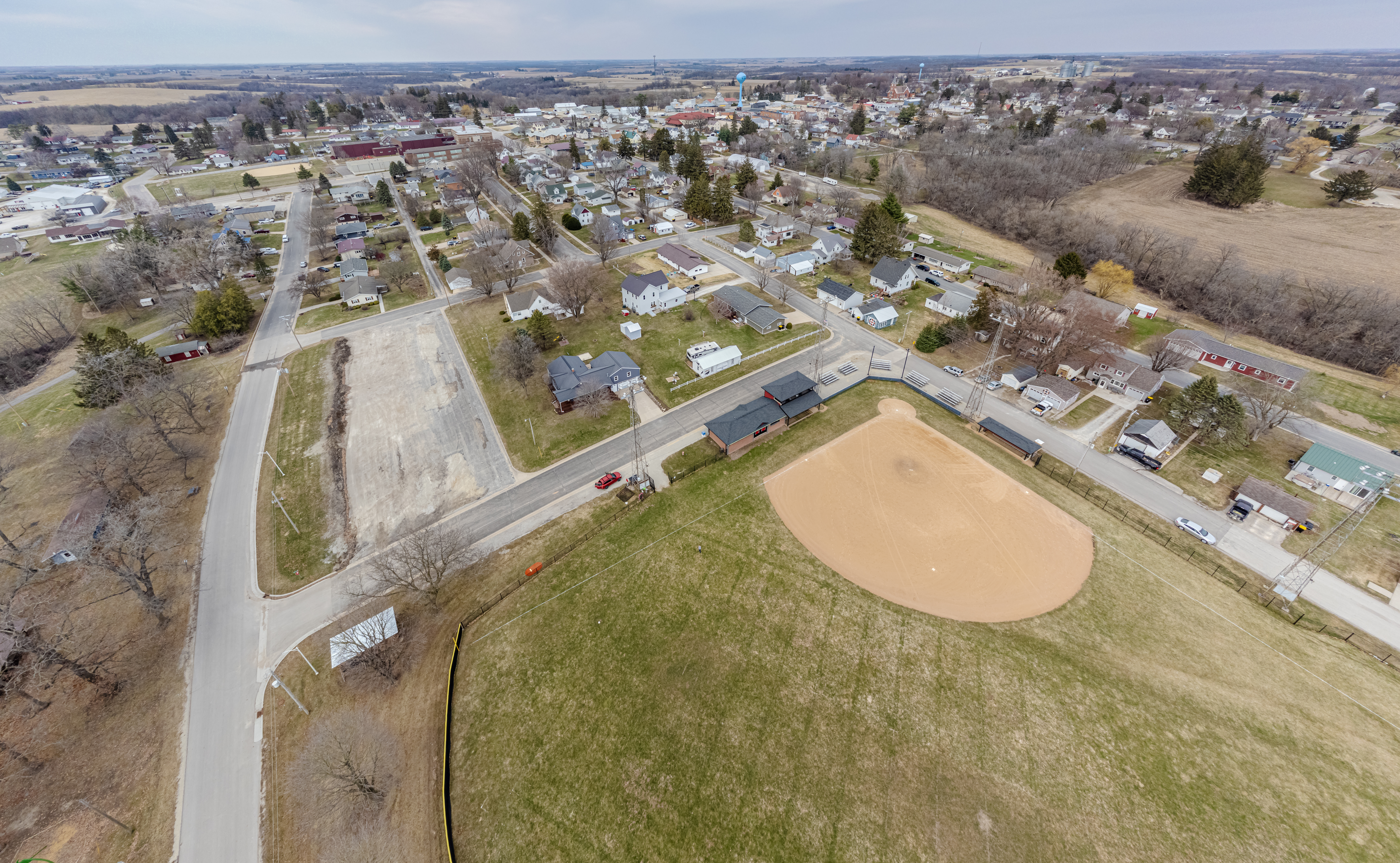

According to the United States Census Bureau, the city has an area of 0.96 square miles (2.49 km^{2}), all land. Minnesota State Highway 44 and County Highways 4 and 16 are three of the main routes in the community.

== Demographics ==
Historical population
Census	Pop.	Note	%±
1880	293		—
1890	394		34.5%
1900	491		24.6%
1910	620		26.3%
1920	753		21.5%
1930	867		15.1%
1940	967		11.5%
1950	1,093		13.0%
1960	1,342		22.8%
1970	1,290		−3.9%
1980	1,275		−1.2%
1990	1,153		−9.6%
2000	1,304		13.1%
2010	1,330		2.0%
2020	1,256		−5.6%
U.S. Decennial Census

=== 2010 census ===
As of the census of 2010, there were 1,330 people, 600 households, and 343 families living in the city. The population density was 1,385.4 inhabitants per square mile (534.9/km^{2}). There were 653 housing units at an average density of 680.2 per square mile (262.6/km^{2}). The racial makeup of the city was 97.8% White, 0.7% African American, 0.1% Native American, 0.6% Asian, and 0.8% from two or more races. Hispanic or Latino of any race were 1.0% of the population.

There were 600 households, of which 25.0% had children under the age of 18 living with them, 44.5% were married couples living together, 9.8% had a female householder with no husband present, 2.8% had a male householder with no wife present, and 42.8% were non-families. 39.5% of all households were made up of individuals, and 23.3% had someone living alone who was 65 years of age or older. The average household size was 2.10 and the average family size was 2.78.

The median age in the city was 47 years. 21.3% of residents were under the age of 18; 5.2% were between the ages of 18 and 24; 21.4% were from 25 to 44; 23.1% were from 45 to 64; and 29% were 65 years of age or older. The gender makeup of the city was 46.2% male and 53.8% female.

=== 2000 census ===
As of the census of 2000, there were 1,304 people, 581 households, and 349 families living in the city. The population density was 1,455.8 inhabitants per square mile (562.1/km^{2}). There were 610 housing units at an average density of 681.0 per square mile (262.9/km^{2}). The racial makeup of the city was 99.00% White, 0.08% Native American, 0.31% Asian, and 0.61% from two or more races. Hispanic or Latino of any race were 0.23% of the population.

There were 581 households, out of which 25.8% had children under the age of 18 living with them, 48.5% were married couples living together, 8.6% had a female householder with no husband present, and 39.9% were non-families. 36.3% of all households were made up of individuals, and 23.2% had someone living alone who was 65 years of age or older. The average household size was 2.12 and the average family size was 2.74.

In the city, the population was spread out, with 21.7% under the age of 18, 6.5% from 18 to 24, 24.7% from 25 to 44, 18.1% from 45 to 64, and 29.0% who were 65 years of age or older. The median age was 43 years. For every 100 females, there were 86.6 males. For every 100 females age 18 and over, there were 82.3 males.

The median income for a household in the city was $29,643, and the median income for a family was $38,000. Males had a median income of $28,182 versus $18,125 for females. The per capita income for the city was $16,307. About 6.7% of families and 11.0% of the population were below the poverty line, including 10.3% of those under age 18 and 15.1% of those age 65 or over.

== Notable people ==
- Jerome O. Gunderson, businessman, farmer, and politician
- Lars Jonson Haukaness, painter and art instructor
- Joseph Langland, poet
- Robert E. A. Lee, film producer
- Carlton C. Qualey, academic and historian
- John Stewart Socha, broadcaster and technology journalist

== Gallery ==
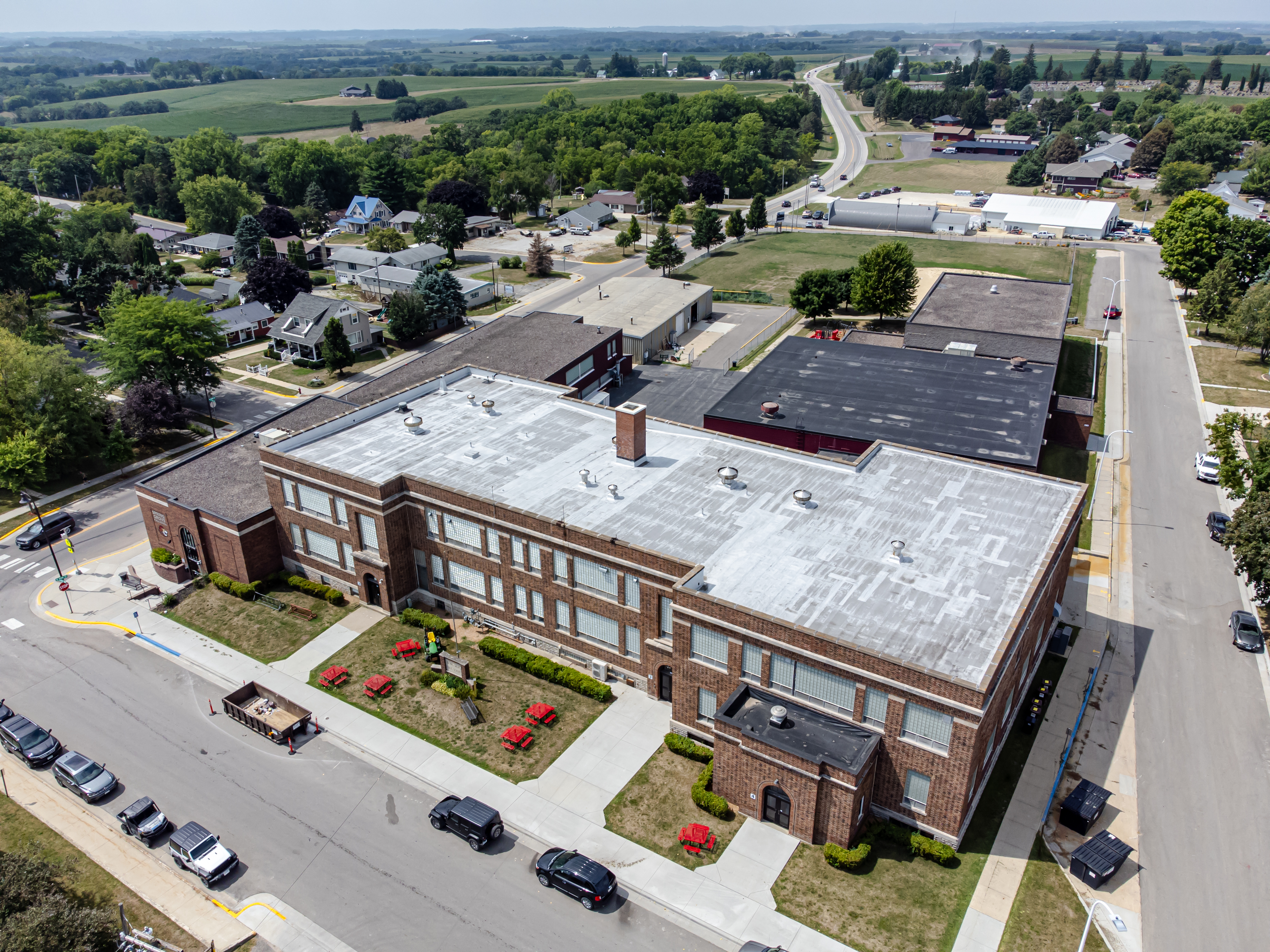
Spring Grove schools

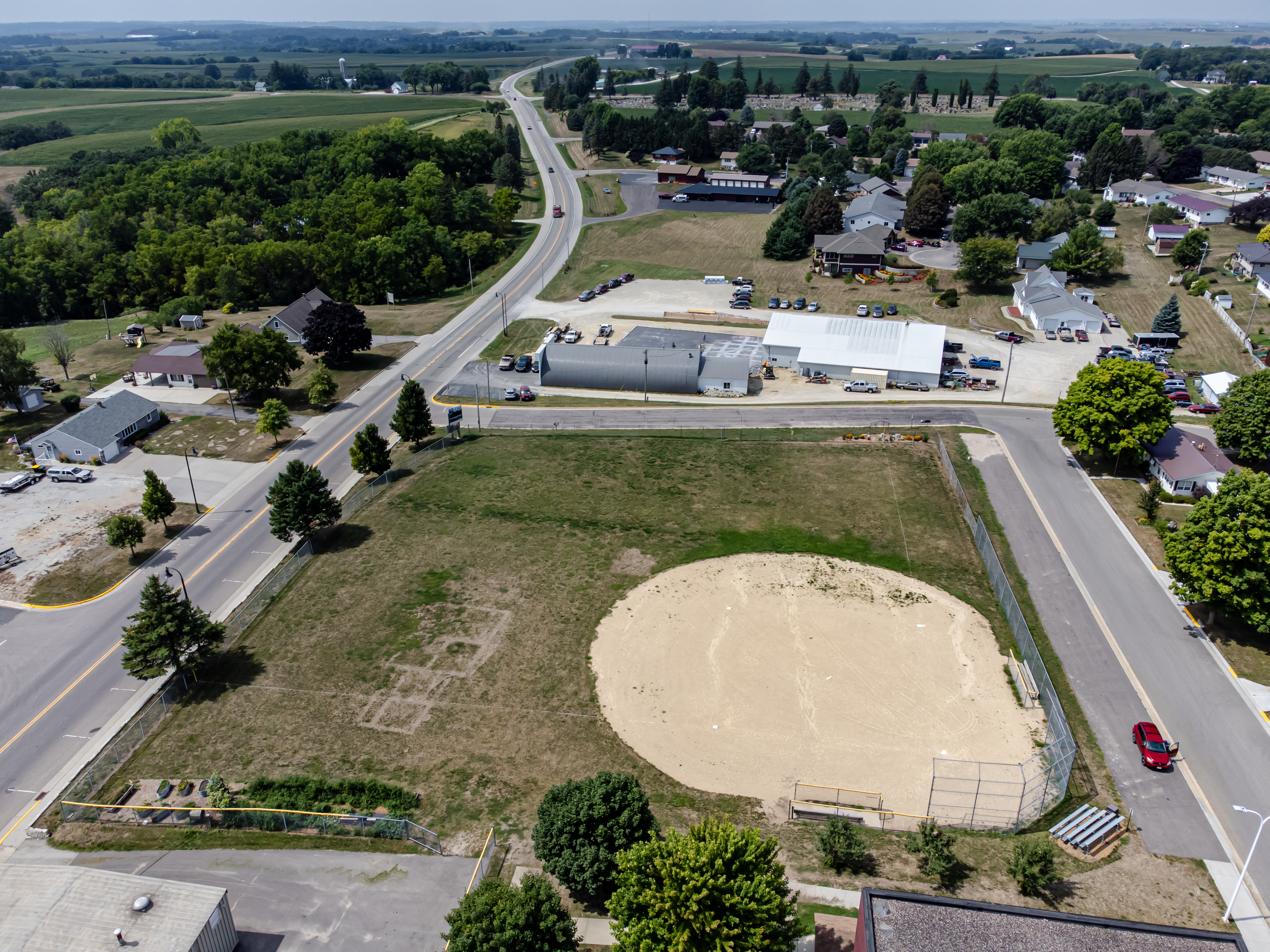
Spring Grove athletic field

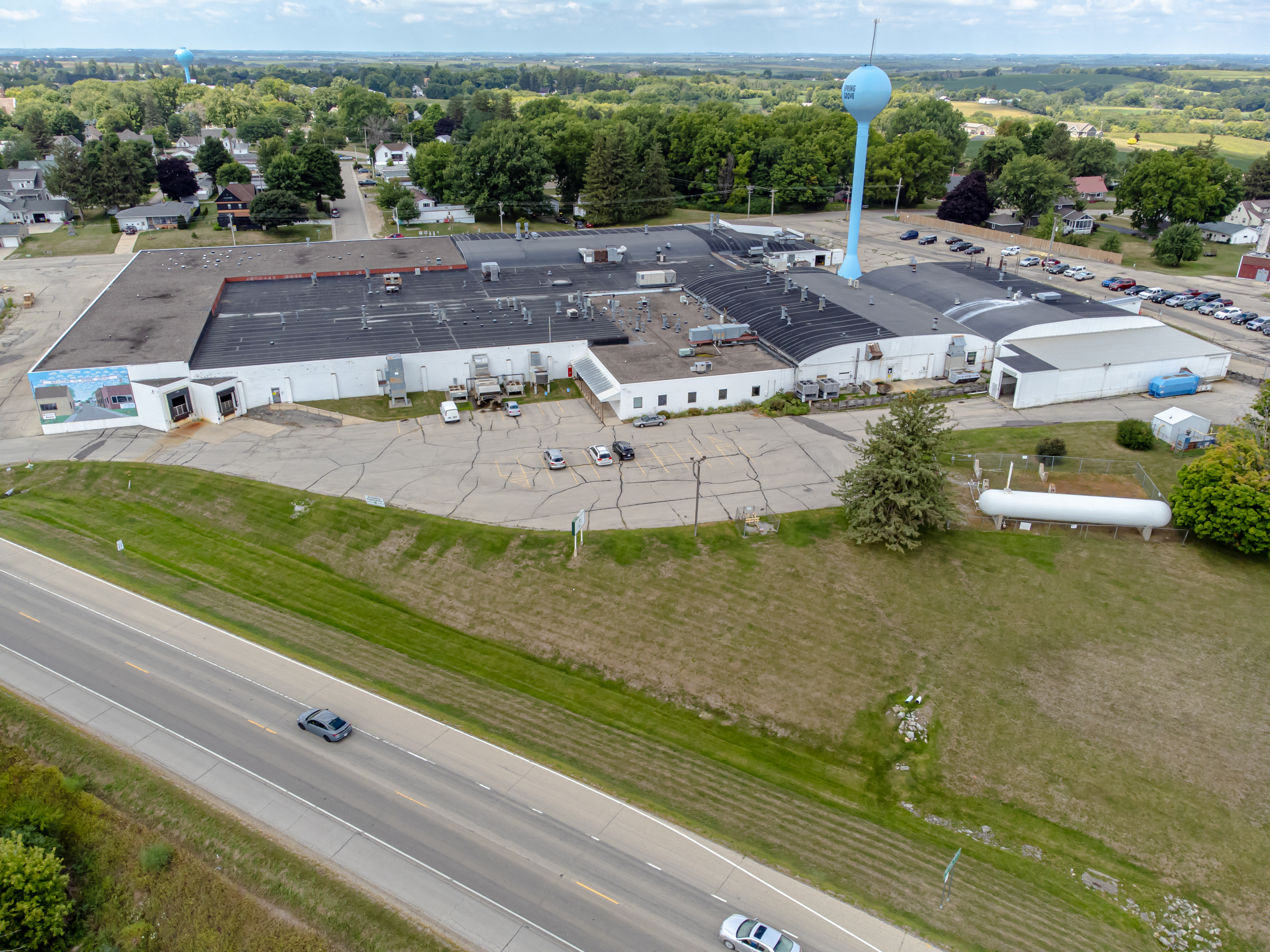
Northern Engraving

== See also ==
- Spring Grove Public Library
