= Bessesen Building =

- Beatrice Bessesen Theater Building
- U.S. Historic district – Contributing property
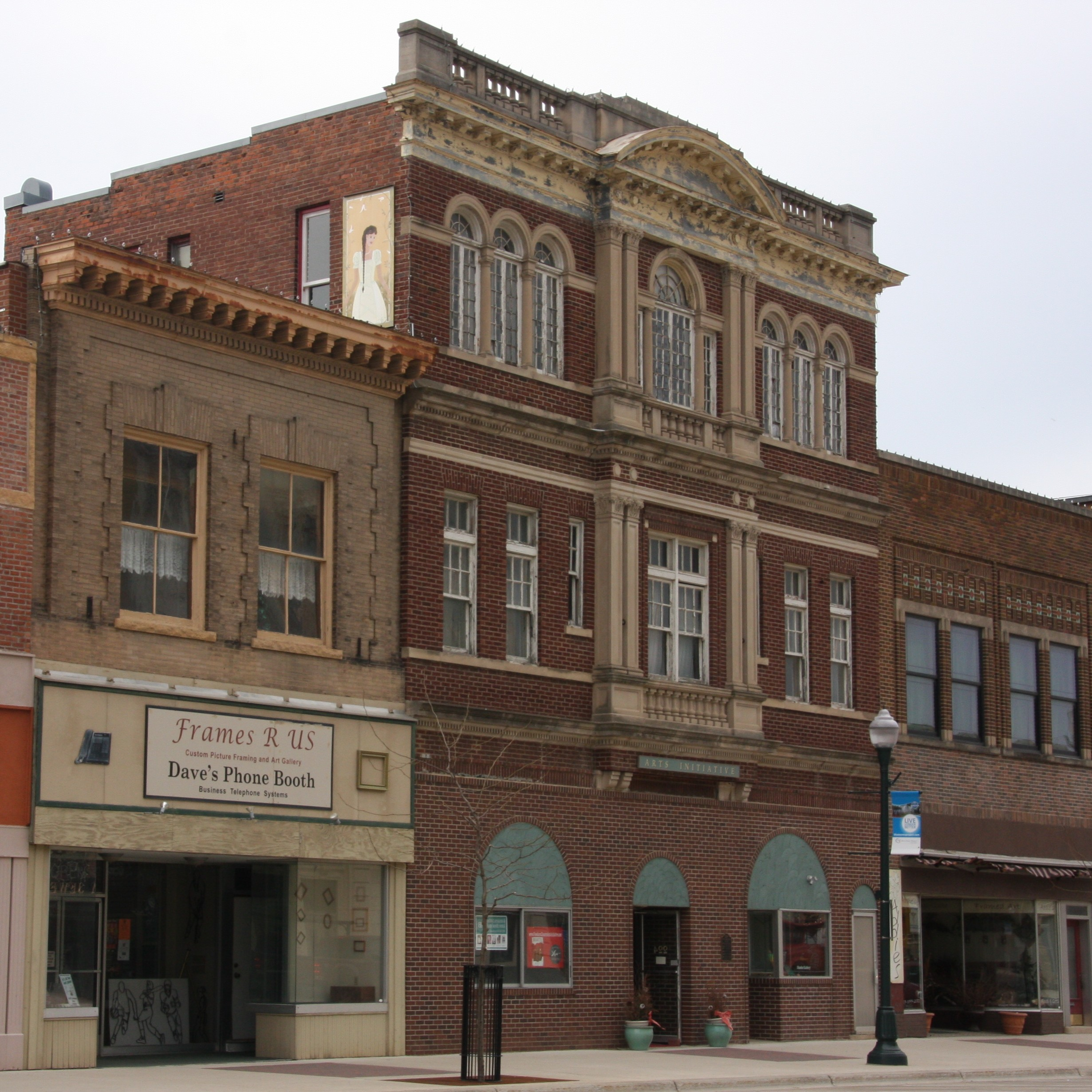
- The Bessessen Building in 2017

- Location within Minnesota
- Location: Albert Lea, Minnesota
- Coordinates: 43°38′54″N 93°22′8″W
- Built: 1916
- Part of: Albert Lea Commercial Historic District (ID03001337)
- Designated CP: December 29, 2003

The Historic Bessesen Building, formerly called the B.B. Theater and Conservatory of Music and later the Rivoli Theater, is located at 224 South Broadway in Albert Lea, Minnesota, United States. It has been used for both commercial and residential purposes.

The Bessesen Opera House was built in 1916, designed by St. Paul architects Cederberg and Van Kirk. The façade is French Renaissance. The interiors of the second and third floor apartments possess both Arts and Crafts style and Art Nouveau elements including terra cotta fireplaces, art glass skylight, and stained glass windows. The building was designed as a 740-seat opera palace to showcase the talents of internationally acclaimed opera prima donna Beatrice Gjertsen Bessesen. After its debut as an opera palace, it became The Rivoli motion picture theater from 1922 to 1975 and the Rivoli Mini-Mall in 1977. It is currently being converted into a regional arts and wellness center and is the home of the Freeborn County Arts Initiative. Historical aspects of the first level have been compromised. The building is currently in need of major restoration. The "Restore the Building Foundation" has been created for that purpose.
