= Robert E. A. Lee =

Film producer (1921–2009)

Robert Edward Alexander Lee (November 9, 1921 – February 27, 2009) was the head of the Lutheran Church's film production and producer of Martin Luther and the Oscar-nominated film A Time for Burning.

== Biography ==
Lee was born in Spring Grove, Minnesota on November 9, 1921, he was awarded a bachelor's degree in 1942 from Luther College in Decorah, Iowa, having majored in music. With experience as a singer and playing the trumpet, he began his career in broadcasting by hosting (and singing on) the show Hymns We Love on the school's radio station. He enlisted in the United States Navy, receiving the Distinguished Flying Cross for his service as a pilot in the Pacific theater during World War II. While he was in the Navy, he married the former Elaine E. Naeseth in 1944, a musician who sang with him in a quartet at Luther College.

He later attended graduate programs at the University of Minnesota and New York University.

=== Martin Luther ===
As assistant director of public relations for the Evangelical Lutheran Church, he was publicist for the 1953 film Martin Luther, a biographical drama directed by Irving Pichel and starring Niall MacGinnis. The film received extensive publicity and media coverage for the conflict it created between Catholics and Protestants.

The film was blocked in areas with sizable Roman Catholic communities. In the span of a week, it attracted 25,000 people who watched the film at Protestant churches in Montreal before the film was banned in Quebec, despite critical praise for the film. After WGN-TV in Chicago canceled a scheduled presentation of the film in 1956, dozens of Protestant leaders criticized the station's decision, with Lee telling The New York Times that WGN had caved into pressure from forces that sought to whitewash history, and that such "Efforts at thought control, wherever they are exerted, are un-American and are to be deplored". The film was broadcast in the Chicago area by WBKB-TV the following year. Martin Luther was nominated for Academy Awards for art direction and cinematography.

=== A Time for Burning ===
Starting in 1954, Lee was executive secretary of Lutheran Film Associates, a joint venture that created media on religious topics cooperatively run by the Evangelical Lutheran Church in America and the Lutheran Church–Missouri Synod. In that role, he led the creation of A Time for Burning as its executive producer, a documentary film released in 1966 about William Youngdahl, the pastor of an all-white Lutheran church in Omaha, Nebraska, and his efforts to have ten of the congregation's couples reach out to a group of ten couples from all-black Lutheran churches nearby. The Lutheran Church was praised for its efforts to describe interracial conflict inside the church.

The 58-minute film, directed by William C. Jersey and Barbara Connell, and with a budget of $100,000, was shot unscripted in cinéma vérité style using handheld cameras. It showed the discord that was created as Youngdahl attempted to establish connections between the couples of different races as a means to improve race relations. Yongdahl, who later resigned from his post due to the conflict was filmed in a confrontation with Ernie Chambers, a young black barber in Omaha who spoke with anger about white people, and was later elected to the Nebraska Legislature, becoming the longest-serving state legislator in state history. Chambers told Youngdahl that "As far as we're concerned, your Jesus is contaminated. You can have Him".

Despite Lee's efforts, all three major networks declined to air the documentary. It was broadcast on PBS in October 1966, with critic Jack Gould of The New York Times calling the film "the most accomplished and sensitive hour of television this season". Former CBS News president Fred W. Friendly called the film the "best civil rights film ever made." The film was released into theaters and was nominated for an Academy Award as best documentary. It was added to the National Film Registry in 2005 by the Library of Congress. It was an inductee of the 2005 National Film Registry list, with the comment: "Hailed by Fred Friendly as "the best civil rights film ever made," this documentary by Bill Jersey chronicles the ultimately unsuccessful attempts of a Nebraska Lutheran minister to integrate his church. Contains some of the best observational "fly on the wall" footage ever filmed, filled with incisive scenes showing people struggling with their prejudices, anger, disillusionment, changing social times and hopes for the future."

Lee described the film as "not about the people of Omaha but about all people, and it is not about race relations but about human relations".

=== Other films ===
With Lutheran Film Associates, Lee was also involved in producing the 1962 film Question 7, directed by Stuart Rosenberg and starring Michael Gwynn, about Christians in East Germany. He also worked on the 1980 television film The Joy of Bach starring Brian Blessed.

=== Death ===
Lee died at age 87 on February 27, 2009 at his home in Baldwin, New York on Long Island, due to cancer. He was survived by four daughters, two sons, eight grandchildren, and seven great-grandchildren and two sisters. His wife died in 2000, the couple having been married for 56 years.
