= Oluf Gjerset =

American politician

Minnesota Senate
- In office 1915–1922

Personal details
- Born: 1 June 1848 Vaagø, Fræna Municipality, Romsdalen, Norway
- Died: 29 May 1941 (aged 92) Chippewa County, Minnesota
- Party: Non-Partisan
- Occupation: Farmer, Attorney

Oluf Gjerset (1 June 1848 – 29 May 1941) was a Norwegian-born, American politician from Minnesota. He served as the mayor of Montevideo, Minnesota and in the Minnesota state senate.

== Background ==
Oluf Gjerset was born in Vågøy (also spelled Vågø) in Fræna Municipality, Norway. He was the son of Ole Sørensen Gjerset and Karen Marie Olsdatter Eidem. His parents had nine children, one of whom died in infancy in Norway. In May, 1871, his family left for America. The family settled on the Big Bend of the Chippewa River in Chippewa County, Minnesota. His father helped organize the Norwegian Lutheran Synod congregation in the Big Bend settlement in Kandiyohi County, Minnesota. His brother, Knut Gjerset was a noted author and historian.

He attended the University of Minnesota Law School, earning his law degree in 1892 and was admitted to the bar the same year.

== Career ==
Gjerset was a member of the Montevideo Board of Education for several years. He served as the County Attorney of Chippewa County, Minnesota from 1897 to 1903 and Municipal (City) Attorney for Montevideo, Minnesota from 1909 to 1913. He was the mayor of Montevideo in 1913.
