= Knut Gjerset =

American historian (1865–1936)

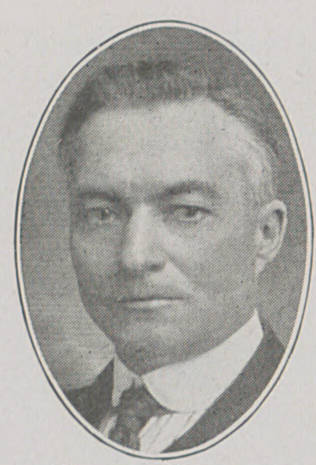
Knut Gjerset

Knut Gjerset (September 15, 1865 – October 29, 1936) was a Norwegian-American author, historian and college professor.

== Biography ==
Knut Gjerset was born at Fræna in Møre og Romsdal, Norway. He was the son of Ole Sørensen Gjerset and Karen Marie Olsdatter Eidem. He immigrated with his family to Chippewa County, Minnesota during 1871. His brother, Oluf Gjerset, was an elected official in Minnesota.

Gjerset attended Willmar Seminary in Willmar, Minnesota, and received his Bachelor of Arts degree in literature from the University of Minnesota in 1893. He held the position of principal at St. Ansgar Seminary in St. Ansgar, Iowa (1893-1895). He was married in 1894 to Helen Baumgarten (1866-1966) at New Richland, Minnesota. Gjerset studied at Johns Hopkins University in Baltimore, Maryland (1895-1896), and at the Heidelberg University (1896 to 1898) where he was awarded a PhD.

Gjerset next worked as a principal at Glenwood Academy in Glenwood, Minnesota. In 1902, he became a professor at Luther College. Gjerset was head of the history department for more than thirty years and co-editor of the literary yearbook Symra (1905-1914). He was curator of the Norwegian-American Historical Museum. He published a number of historical works, including History of the Norwegian People (1915) and History of Iceland (1924). Gjerset was appointed Knight of the 1st class in the Order of St. Olav in 1917. He was the chairman of the committee on exhibits for the Norse-American Centennial in 1925.

== Selected works ==
- English Grammar (1908)
- Brændevinssamla gene og avholdsarbeidet i Norge (1911)
- History of the Norwegian People, two volumes (1915)
- Luther College Museum (1923)
- John Martin Kalberlahn (1924)
- History of Iceland (1924)
- Health Conditions and the Practice of Medicine Among the Early Norwegian Settlers, 1825-1865 with Dr. Ludvig Hektoen (1926)
- Norwegian-American Studies and Records with Theodore C. Blegen, Kristian Prestgard and Laurence M. Larson (1927)
- Norwegian-American Historical Museum (1929)
- Norwegian Sailors on the Great Lakes (1933)

== Related reading ==
- Luther College Faculty (1922) Luther College Through Sixty Years 1861-1921 (Minneapolis: Augsburg Publishing House
- Norlie, Olaf (1925) History of the Norwegian People in America (Minneapolis: Augsburg Publishing House)
