= Index of Minnesota-related articles =

The location of the state of Minnesota in the United States of America

The following is an alphabetical list of articles related to the U.S. state of Minnesota.

== 0–9 ==
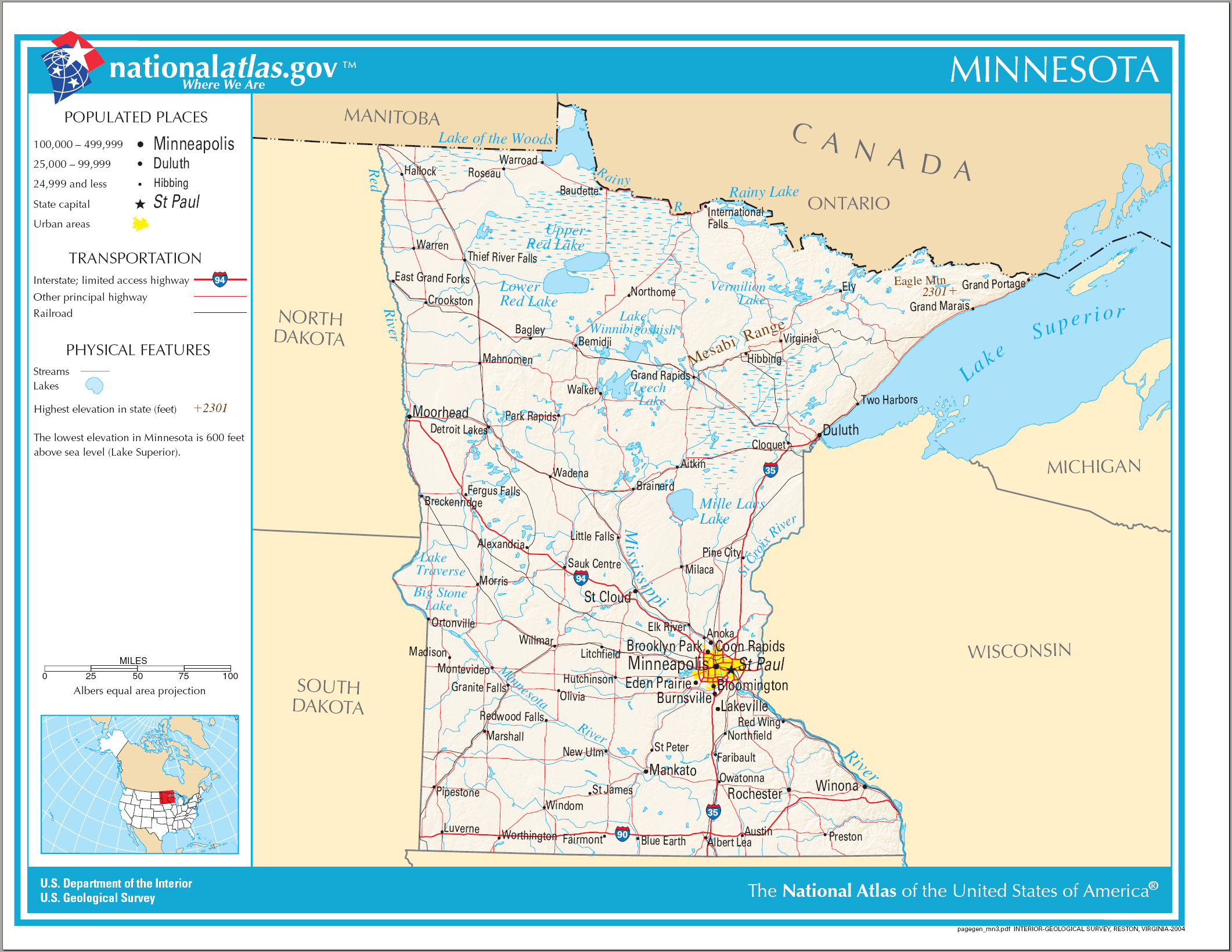
An enlargeable map of the state of Minnesota

- .mn.us – Internet second-level domain for the state of Minnesota
- 32nd state to join the United States of America

== A ==
- Abortion in Minnesota
- Adjacent states and provinces:
  - Province of Manitoba
  - Province of Ontario
  - State of Iowa
  - State of Michigan
  - State of North Dakota
  - State of South Dakota
  - State of Wisconsin
- Agriculture in Minnesota
- Airports in Minnesota
- Amusement parks in Minnesota
- Aquaria in Minnesota
  - commons:Category:Aquaria in Minnesota
- Arboreta in Minnesota
  - commons:Category:Arboreta in Minnesota
- Archaeology of Minnesota
  - Category:Archaeological sites in Minnesota
    - commons:Category:Archaeological sites in Minnesota
- Architecture of Minnesota
- Art museums and galleries in Minnesota
  - commons:Category:Art museums and galleries in Minnesota
- Astronomical observatories in Minnesota
  - commons:Category:Astronomical observatories in Minnesota

== B ==
- Beaches of Minnesota
  - commons:Category:Beaches of Minnesota
- Botanical gardens in Minnesota
  - commons:Category:Botanical gardens in Minnesota
- Buildings and structures in Minnesota
  - commons:Category:Buildings and structures in Minnesota

== C ==
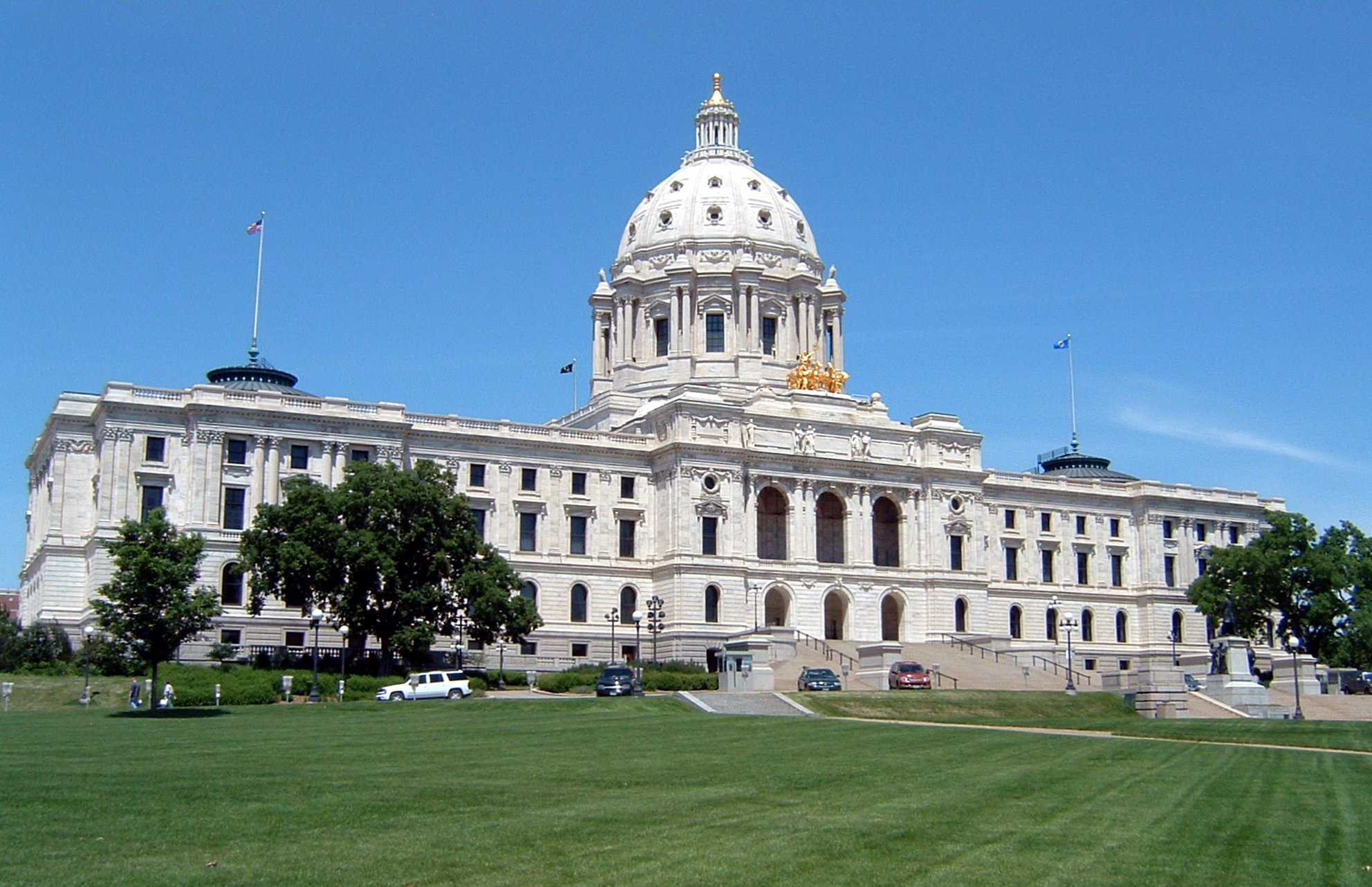
The Minnesota State Capitol in Saint Paul

- Canyons and gorges of Minnesota
  - commons:Category:Canyons and gorges of Minnesota
- Capital of the State of Minnesota
- Capitol of the State of Minnesota
  - commons:Category:Minnesota State Capitol
- Casinos in Minnesota
- Caves of Minnesota
  - commons:Category:Caves of Minnesota
- Cemeteries in Minnesota
- Census statistical areas of Minnesota
- Cities in Minnesota
  - commons:Category:Cities in Minnesota
- Climate of Minnesota
  - Category:Climate of Minnesota
    - commons:Category:Climate of Minnesota
- Climate change in Minnesota
- Colleges and universities in Minnesota
  - commons:Category:Universities and colleges in Minnesota

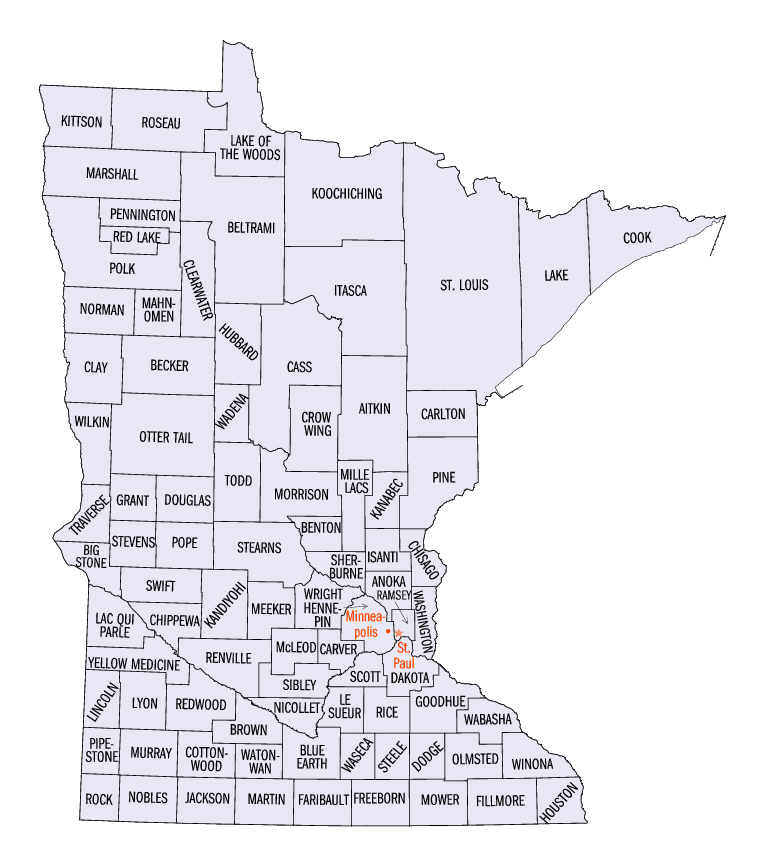
An enlargeable map of the 87 counties of the State of Minnesota

- Communications in Minnesota
  - commons:Category:Communications in Minnesota
- Companies in Minnesota
  - Category:Companies based in Minnesota
- Congressional districts of Minnesota
- Constitution of the State of Minnesota
- Convention centers in Minnesota
  - commons:Category:Convention centers in Minnesota
- Counties of the State of Minnesota
  - commons:Category:Counties in Minnesota
- Courthouses in Minnesota
- Culture of Minnesota
  - Category:Culture of Minnesota
    - commons:Category:Minnesota culture

== D ==
- Demographics of Minnesota

== E ==
- Ecology of Minnesota
- Economy of Minnesota
  - Category:Economy of Minnesota
    - commons:Category:Economy of Minnesota
- Education in Minnesota
  - Category:Education in Minnesota
    - commons:Category:Education in Minnesota
- Category:Elections in Minnesota
  - commons:Category:Elections in Minnesota
- Category:Environment of Minnesota
  - commons:Category:Environment of Minnesota

== F ==
The flag of the state of Minnesota

- Festivals in Minnesota
  - commons:Category:Festivals in Minnesota
- Films set in Minnesota
- Films shot in Minnesota
- Flag of the state of Minnesota
- Flora of Minnesota
- Forests in Minnesota
  - Category:Minnesota state forests
- Forestry in Minnesota
- Forts in Minnesota
  - Category:Forts in Minnesota
    - commons:Category:Forts in Minnesota

== G ==
The Great Seal of the State of Minnesota

- Geography of Minnesota
  - Category:Geography of Minnesota
    - commons:Category:Geography of Minnesota
- Geology of Minnesota
  - Category:Geology of Minnesota
    - commons:Category:Geology of Minnesota
- Ghost towns in Minnesota
  - Category:Ghost towns in Minnesota
    - commons:Category:Ghost towns in Minnesota
- Golf clubs and courses in Minnesota
- Government of the state of Minnesota website
  - Category:Government of Minnesota
    - commons:Category:Government of Minnesota
- Governor of the State of Minnesota
  - List of governors of Minnesota
- Great Seal of the State of Minnesota

== H ==
- Hennepin County Law Library
- Heritage railroads in Minnesota
  - commons:Category:Heritage railroads in Minnesota
- High schools of Minnesota
- Higher education in Minnesota
- Highway routes in Minnesota
- Hiking trails in Minnesota
  - commons:Category:Hiking trails in Minnesota
- History of Minnesota
  - Historical outline of Minnesota
- Hospitals in Minnesota
- House of Representatives of the State of Minnesota

== I ==
- Images of Minnesota
  - commons:Category:Minnesota
- Islands in Minnesota
- Island Station Power Plant

== L ==
- Lakes in Minnesota
  - Lake Superior
  - Category:Lakes of Minnesota
    - commons:Category:Lakes of Minnesota
- Landmarks in Minnesota
  - commons:Category:Landmarks in Minnesota
- Lieutenant Governor of the State of Minnesota
- Lists related to the state of Minnesota:
  - List of airports in Minnesota
  - List of Minnesota amphibians
  - List of Minnesota ants
  - List of Minnesota aquatic plants
  - List of Minnesota birds
  - List of census statistical areas in Minnesota
  - List of cities in Minnesota
  - List of colleges and universities in Minnesota
  - List of companies in Minnesota
  - List of United States congressional districts in Minnesota
  - List of counties in Minnesota
  - List of dams and reservoirs in Minnesota
  - List of fish in Minnesota
  - List of forts in Minnesota
  - List of ghost towns in Minnesota
  - List of governors of Minnesota
  - List of high schools in Minnesota
  - List of highway routes in Minnesota
  - List of hospitals in Minnesota
  - List of islands in Minnesota
  - List of lakes in Minnesota
  - List of law enforcement agencies in Minnesota
  - List of lieutenant governors of Minnesota
  - List of Minnesota mammals
  - List of museums in Minnesota
  - List of National Historic Landmarks in Minnesota
  - List of newspapers in Minnesota
  - List of people from Minnesota
  - List of power stations in Minnesota
  - List of radio stations in Minnesota
  - List of railroads in Minnesota
  - List of Registered Historic Places in Minnesota
  - List of Minnesota reptiles
  - List of rivers of Minnesota
  - List of school districts in Minnesota
  - List of snakes in Minnesota
  - List of state forests in Minnesota
  - List of state parks in Minnesota
  - List of state prisons in Minnesota
  - List of symbols of the State of Minnesota
  - List of television stations in Minnesota
  - List of towns in Minnesota
  - List of Minnesota trees
  - List of Minnesota's congressional delegations
  - List of United States congressional districts in Minnesota
  - List of United States representatives from Minnesota
  - List of United States senators from Minnesota
  - List of Minnesota weather records
  - List of Minnesota wild flowers
  - Louisiana Purchase of 1803

== M ==
- Maps of Minnesota
  - commons:Category:Maps of Minnesota
- Maritime Heritage Minnesota
- Mass media in Minnesota
- Minneapolis, Minnesota
- Minnesota website
  - Category:Minnesota
    - commons:Category:Minnesota
- Category:Minnesota State Capitol
  - commons:Category:Minnesota State Capitol
- Minnesota Technology Education Association
- Minnesotans' Military Appreciation Fund
- Mississippi River
- MN – United States Postal Service postal code for the state of Minnesota
- Mountains of Minnesota
  - commons:Category:Mountains of Minnesota
- Museums in Minnesota
  - Category:Museums in Minnesota
    - commons:Category:Museums in Minnesota
- Music of Minnesota
  - commons:Category:Music of Minnesota

== N ==
- National forests of Minnesota
  - commons:Category:National Forests of Minnesota
- National Historic Landmarks
- National Natural Landmarks in Minnesota
- Natural arches of Minnesota
  - commons:Category:Natural arches of Minnesota
- Natural disasters of Minnesota
- Natural gas pipelines in Minnesota
- Natural history of Minnesota
  - commons:Category:Natural history of Minnesota
- Nature centers in Minnesota
  - commons:Category:Nature centers in Minnesota
- News media in Minnesota
- Newspapers of Minnesota

== O ==
- Outdoor sculptures in Minnesota
  - commons:Category:Outdoor sculptures in Minnesota

== P ==
- People from Minnesota
  - Category:People from Minnesota
    - commons:Category:People from Minnesota
    - Category:People from Minnesota by populated place
    - Category:People from Minnesota by county
    - Category:People from Minnesota by occupation
- Politics of Minnesota
  - Category:Politics of Minnesota
    - commons:Category:Politics of Minnesota
- Protected areas of Minnesota
  - commons:Category:Protected areas of Minnesota

== R ==
- Radio stations in Minnesota
- Railroad museums in Minnesota
  - commons:Category:Railroad museums in Minnesota
- Railroads in Minnesota
- Red River of the North
- Registered Historic Places in Minnesota
  - commons:Category:Registered Historic Places in Minnesota
- Religion in Minnesota
  - Category:Religion in Minnesota
    - commons:Category:Religion in Minnesota
- Repopulation of wolves in Midwestern United States
- Rivers of Minnesota
  - commons:Category:Rivers of Minnesota
- Rock formations in Minnesota
  - commons:Category:Rock formations in Minnesota
- Roller coasters in Minnesota
  - commons:Category:Roller coasters in Minnesota

== S ==
- Saint Paul, Minnesota, territorial and state capital since 1849
- School districts of Minnesota
- Scouting in Minnesota
- Senate of the State of Minnesota
- Settlements in Minnesota
  - Cities in Minnesota
  - Townships in Minnesota
  - Census Designated Places in Minnesota
  - Other unincorporated communities in Minnesota
  - List of ghost towns in Minnesota
- Ski areas and resorts in Minnesota
  - commons:Category:Ski areas and resorts in Minnesota
- Solar power in Minnesota
- Sports in Minnesota
  - Category:Sports in Minnesota
    - commons:Category:Sports in Minnesota
  - Category:Sports venues in Minnesota
    - commons:Category:Sports venues in Minnesota
- State Capitol of Minnesota
- State of Minnesota website
  - Constitution of the State of Minnesota
  - Government of the state of Minnesota
    - Category:Government of Minnesota
      - commons:Category:Government of Minnesota
  - Executive branch of the government of the state of Minnesota
    - Governor of the State of Minnesota
  - Legislative branch of the government of the state of Minnesota
    - Legislature of the State of Minnesota
      - Senate of the State of Minnesota
      - House of Representatives of the State of Minnesota
  - Judicial branch of the government of the state of Minnesota
    - Supreme Court of the State of Minnesota
- State parks of Minnesota
  - commons:Category:State parks of Minnesota
- State prisons of Minnesota
- Structures in Minnesota
  - commons:Category:Buildings and structures in Minnesota
- Supreme Court of the State of Minnesota
- Symbols of the state of Minnesota
  - Category:Symbols of Minnesota
    - commons:Category:Symbols of Minnesota

== T ==
- Telecommunications in Minnesota
  - commons:Category:Communications in Minnesota
- Telephone area codes in Minnesota
- Television shows set in Minnesota
- Television stations in Minnesota
- Territory of Iowa, 1838–1846
- Territory of Louisiana, 1805–1812
- Territory of Michigan, 1805-(1834–1836)-1837
- Territory of Minnesota, 1849–1858
- Territory of Missouri, 1812–1821
- Territory of Wisconsin, 1836-(1838)-1848
- Theatres in Minnesota
  - commons:Category:Theatres in Minnesota
- Tourism in Minnesota website
  - commons:Category:Tourism in Minnesota
- Towns in Minnesota
  - commons:Category:Cities in Minnesota
- Transportation in Minnesota
  - Category:Transportation in Minnesota
    - commons:Category:Transport in Minnesota

== U ==
- United States of America
  - States of the United States of America
  - United States census statistical areas of Minnesota
  - Minnesota's congressional delegations
  - United States congressional districts in Minnesota
    - Minnesota's 1st congressional district
    - Minnesota's 2nd congressional district
    - Minnesota's 3rd congressional district
    - Minnesota's 4th congressional district
    - Minnesota's 5th congressional district
    - Minnesota's 6th congressional district
    - Minnesota's 7th congressional district
    - Minnesota's 8th congressional district
  - United States Court of Appeals for the Eighth Circuit
  - United States District Court for the District of Minnesota
  - United States representatives from Minnesota
  - United States senators from Minnesota
- Universities and colleges in Minnesota
  - commons:Category:Universities and colleges in Minnesota
- US-MN – ISO 3166-2:US region code for the State of Minnesota

== W ==
- Water parks in Minnesota
- Waterfalls of Minnesota
  - commons:Category:Waterfalls of Minnesota
  Wikimedia
  - Wikimedia Commons:Category:Minnesota
    - commons:Category:Maps of Minnesota
  - Wikinews:Category:Minnesota
    - Wikinews:Portal:Minnesota
  - Wikipedia Category:Minnesota
    - Wikipedia Portal:Minnesota
    - Wikipedia:WikiProject Minnesota
      - Category:WikiProject Minnesota articles
      - Wikipedia:WikiProject Minnesota#Participants
- Wind power in Minnesota

== Z ==
- Zoos in Minnesota
  - commons:Category:Zoos in Minnesota

== See also ==
- Topic overview:
  - Minnesota
  - Outline of Minnesota
