= Outline of Minnesota =

Overview of and topical guide to Minnesota

Flag of Minnesota

State seal

The following outline is provided as an overview of and topical guide to the U.S. state of Minnesota:

Minnesota – U.S. state located in the Midwestern United States. The twelfth largest state of the U.S., it is the twenty-first most populous, with 5.3 million residents. Minnesota was carved out of the eastern half of the Minnesota Territory and admitted to the Union as the thirty-second state on May 11, 1858. Known as the Land of 10,000 Lakes, the state's name comes from a Dakota word for "sky-tinted water".

== General reference ==
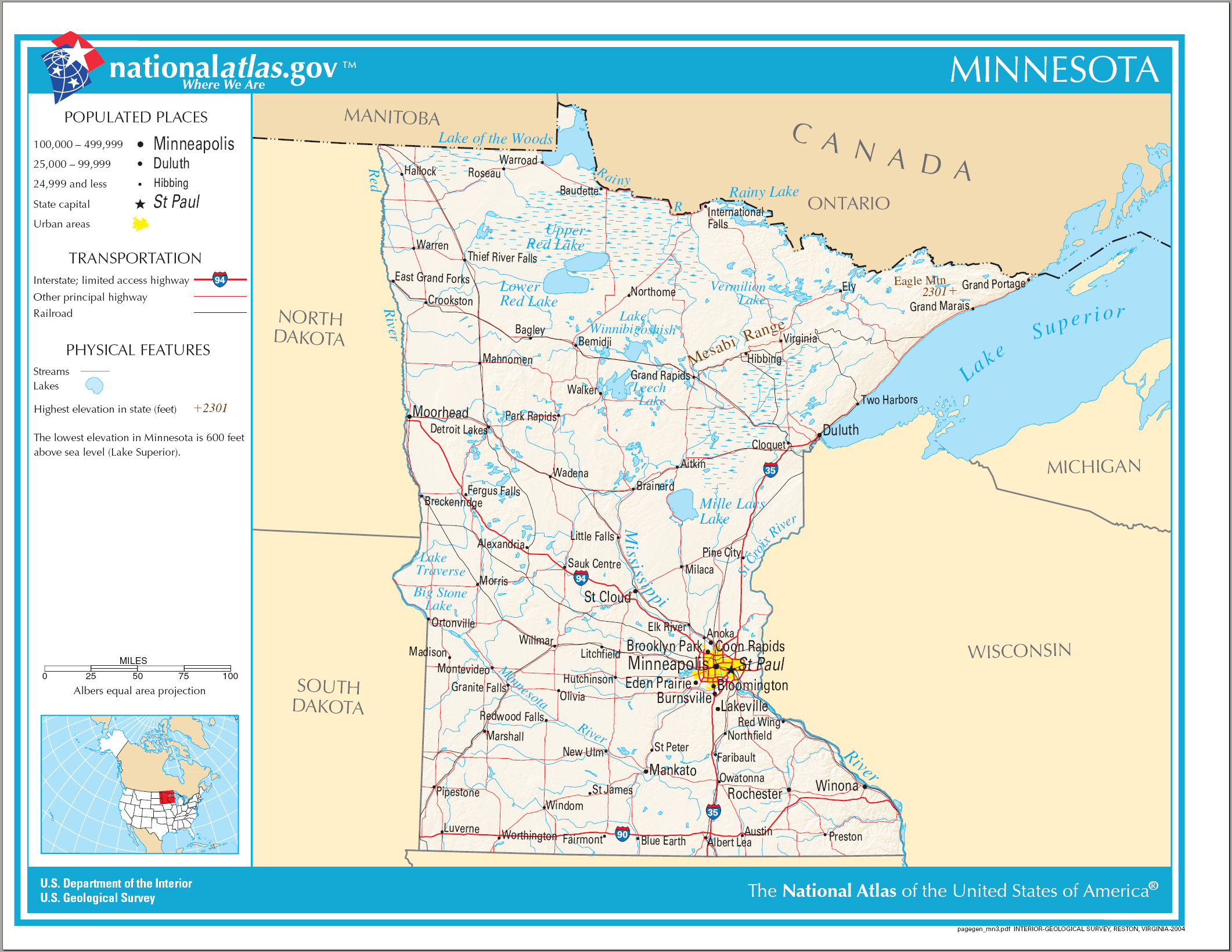
An enlargeable map of Minnesota

- Names
  - Common name: Minnesota
    - Pronunciation: /mɪnɪˈsoʊtə/
  - Official name: State of Minnesota
  - Abbreviations and name codes
    - Postal symbol: MN
    - ISO 3166-2 code: US-MN
    - Internet second-level domain: .mn.us
  - Nicknames
    - Butter Country
    - Bread and Butter State
    - Bread Basket of the Nation
    - Gopher State
    - Land of 10,000 Lakes (currently used on license plates)
    - Land of Lakes
    - Land of Sky-Blue Waters
    - North Star State
    - State of Hockey
- Adjectival: Minnesota
- Demonym: Minnesotan

== Geography of Minnesota ==
Geography of Minnesota

- Minnesota is: a U.S. state, a federal state of the United States of America
- Location
  - Northern Hemisphere
  - Western Hemisphere
    - Americas
      - North America
        - Anglo America
        - Northern America
          - United States of America
            - Contiguous United States
              - Canada–US border
              - Central United States
                - West North Central States
              - Midwestern United States
                - Upper Midwest
          - Great Lakes Region
- Population of Minnesota: 5,303,925 (2010 U.S. Census)
- Area of Minnesota: 86,936 sq mi (225,163 km^{2})
- Atlas of Minnesota

=== Places in Minnesota ===
- Historic places in Minnesota
  - Ghost towns in Minnesota
  - National Historic Landmarks in Minnesota
  - Forts in Minnesota
  - National Register of Historic Places listings in Minnesota
    - Bridges on the National Register of Historic Places in Minnesota
- National Natural Landmarks in Minnesota
- State forests in Minnesota
- State parks in Minnesota
- County and regional parks in Minnesota

=== Environment of Minnesota ===
Environment of Minnesota

- Climate of Minnesota
  - Climate change
  - Weather records of Minnesota
- Natural history of Minnesota
- Geology of Minnesota
- Protected areas in Minnesota
  - State forests of Minnesota
- Superfund sites in Minnesota
- Wildlife of Minnesota
  - Flora of Minnesota
    - Aquatic plants of Minnesota
    - Trees of Minnesota by family (by scientific name)
    - Wildflowers of Minnesota
    - Grasses, sedges, and rushes of Minnesota
  - Fauna of Minnesota
    - Amphibians of Minnesota
    - Ants of Minnesota
    - Birds of Minnesota
    - Fish of Minnesota
    - Mammals of Minnesota
    - Reptiles of Minnesota
      - Snakes of Minnesota

==== Natural geographic features of Minnesota ====
- Ecoregions of Minnesota
- Lakes of Minnesota
- Rivers of Minnesota
- Streams of Minnesota

=== Regions of Minnesota ===
Regions of Minnesota

- Central Minnesota
- Eastern Minnesota
  - Twin Cities Metropolitan Region
- Northern Minnesota
  - Arrowhead Region
  - Red River Valley
  - Northwest Angle
- Southern Minnesota
  - Southeastern Minnesota

==== Administrative divisions of Minnesota ====
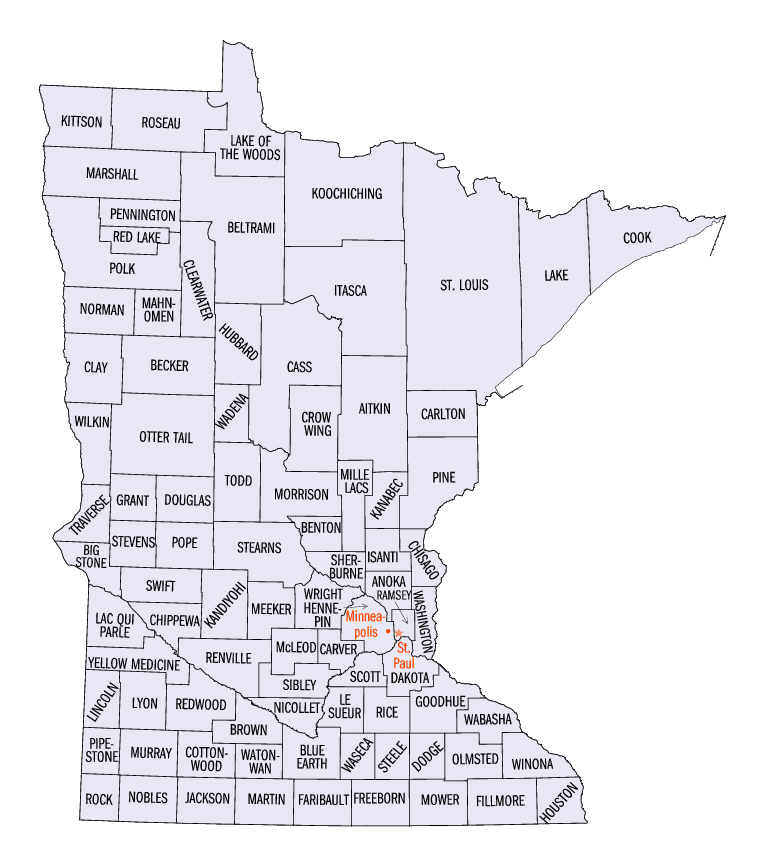
An enlargeable map of the 87 counties of Minnesota

- The 87 counties of the state of Minnesota
  - Municipalities in Minnesota
    - Cities in Minnesota
      - State capital of Minnesota: Saint Paul
      - Largest city of Minnesota: Minneapolis
      - City nicknames in Minnesota
    - Towns in Minnesota
  - List of townships in Minnesota

=== Demography of Minnesota ===
Demographics of Minnesota

== Government and politics of Minnesota ==
Politics of Minnesota

- Form of government: U.S. state government
- Minnesota's congressional delegations
- Minnesota State Capitol
- Elections in Minnesota
  - Electoral reform in Minnesota
- Political party strength in Minnesota

=== Branches of the government of Minnesota ===
Government of Minnesota

==== Executive branch of the government of Minnesota ====
- Governor of Minnesota
  - Lieutenant Governor of Minnesota
  - Secretary of State of Minnesota
- State departments
  - Minnesota Department of Employment and Economic Development
  - Minnesota Department of Natural Resources
  - Minnesota Department of Transportation
  - Minnesota Housing Finance Agency
  - Minnesota Indian Affairs Council
  - Minnesota Public Utilities Commission
  - Minnesota State Lottery
  - Minnesota State Patrol

==== Legislative branch of the government of Minnesota ====
- Minnesota Legislature (bicameral)
  - Upper house: Minnesota Senate
  - Lower house: Minnesota House of Representatives

==== Judicial branch of the government of Minnesota ====
Courts of Minnesota

- Supreme Court of Minnesota

=== Law and order in Minnesota ===
Law of Minnesota

- Cannabis in Minnesota
- Constitution of Minnesota
- Crime in Minnesota
- Gun laws in Minnesota
- Law enforcement in Minnesota
  - Law enforcement agencies in Minnesota
    - Minnesota State Police
  - Prisons in Minnesota
- Same-sex marriage in Minnesota

=== Military in Minnesota ===
- Minnesota Air National Guard
- Minnesota Army National Guard

== History of Minnesota ==
History of Minnesota

=== History of Minnesota, by period ===
- Prehistory of Minnesota
  - Indigenous peoples
- English territory of Rupert's Land, 1670–1707
- French colony of Canada, (1685–1699)
- French colony of Louisiane, (1699–1764)
  - Treaty of Fontainebleau of 1762
  - Treaty of Paris of 1763
- British territory of Rupert's Land, (1707–1818)-1870
  - History of the area of Minnesota east of the Mississippi River from 1763 to 1849:
  - British (though predominantly Francophone) Province of Quebec, (1763–1783)-1791
- American Revolutionary War, April 19, 1775 – September 3, 1783
  - United States Declaration of Independence, July 4, 1776
  - Treaty of Paris, September 3, 1783
    - Unorganized territory of the United States, 1783–1787
  - Territory Northwest of the River Ohio, (1787–1800)-1803
  - Territory of Indiana, (1800–1809)-1816
  - Territory of Illinois, 1809–1818
    - War of 1812, June 18, 1812 – March 23, 1815
      - Treaty of Ghent, December 24, 1814
    - Anglo-American Convention of 1818
      - Northwest Angle
  - Territory of Michigan, 1805-(1818–1836)-1837
    - Winnebago War, 1827
    - Black Hawk War, 1832
  - Territory of Wisconsin, 1836–1848
    - Webster–Ashburton Treaty of 1842
      - Boundary Waters
    - Mexican–American War, April 25, 1846 – February 2, 1848
  - Unorganized Territory, 1821-(1848–1849)-1854
  - History of the area of Minnesota west of the Mississippi River from 1764 to 1849:
  - Spanish (though predominantly Francophone) district of Alta Luisiana, 1764–1803
    - Third Treaty of San Ildefonso of 1800
  - French district of Haute-Louisiane, 1803
    - Louisiana Purchase of 1803
- Unorganized U.S. territory created by the Louisiana Purchase, 1803–1804
  - District of Louisiana, 1804–1805
  - Territory of Louisiana, 1805–1812
  - Territory of Missouri, 1812–1821
    - War of 1812, June 18, 1812 – March 23, 1815
      - Treaty of Ghent, December 24, 1814
    - Anglo-American Convention of 1818
      - Red River Valley of Rupert's Land
  - Unorganized Territory, (1821–1834)-1854
  - Territory of Michigan, 1805-(1834–1838)-1837
  - Territory of Iowa, 1838–1846
  - Unorganized Territory, 1821-(1846–1849)-1854
    - Mexican–American War, April 25, 1846 – February 2, 1848
- Territory of Minnesota, 1849–1858
- State of Minnesota becomes 32nd State admitted to the United States of America on May 11, 1858
  - American Civil War, April 12, 1861 – May 13, 1865
    - Minnesota in the American Civil War

=== History of Minnesota, by region ===
- By City
  - History of Minneapolis
  - History of Richfield, Minnesota
  - History of Saint Paul, Minnesota

=== History of Minnesota, by subject ===
- List of Minnesota state legislatures
- History of music of Minnesota
- History of sports in Minnesota
  - History of the Minnesota Twins
    - Minnesota Twins Draft History
  - History of the Minnesota Vikings
- Natural history of Minnesota

== Culture of Minnesota ==
Culture of Minnesota

- Cuisine of Minnesota
- Museums in Minnesota
- Religion in Minnesota
  - Archdiocese of Saint Paul and Minneapolis
    - Franciscan Brothers of Peace
  - Lutheran Church–Missouri Synod
    - Minnesota North District
    - Minnesota South District
  - Episcopal Diocese of Minnesota
  - Orthodox Church in America Diocese of the Midwest
  - Synagogues in Minnesota
- Scouting in Minnesota
- State symbols of Minnesota
  - Flag of the State of Minnesota
  - Great Seal of the State of Minnesota

=== The arts in Minnesota ===
- Music of Minnesota
- Theater in Minnesota

=== Sports in Minnesota ===
Sports in Minnesota

- American football

- NFL – Minnesota Vikings
- NCAA – Minnesota Golden Gophers football
- Women's Football Alliance – Minnesota Vixen

- Baseball

- MLB – Minnesota Twins
- NCAA – Minnesota Golden Gophers baseball

- Basketball

- NBA – Minnesota Timberwolves
- NCAA – Minnesota Golden Gophers men's basketball, Minnesota Golden Gophers women's basketball
- WNBA – Minnesota Lynx

- Ice hockey

- NHL – Minnesota Wild
- NCAA – Minnesota Golden Gophers men's ice hockey, Minnesota Golden Gophers women's ice hockey
- National Women's Hockey League – Minnesota Whitecaps

- Soccer

- MLS – Minnesota United FC

- Rugby football

- Minnesota Rugby Football Union – Blue Ox RFC, Minneapolis Mayhem

== Economy and infrastructure of Minnesota ==
Economy of Minnesota

- Communications in Minnesota
  - Newspapers in Minnesota
  - Radio stations in Minnesota
  - Television stations in Minnesota
- Energy in Minnesota
  - Power stations in Minnesota
  - Solar power in Minnesota
  - Wind power in Minnesota
- Health care in Minnesota
  - Hospitals in Minnesota
- Transportation in Minnesota
  - Bicycling in Minnesota
    - Rail trails in Minnesota
  - Airports in Minnesota
  - Rail transport in Minnesota
    - Railroads in Minnesota
    - Passenger rail in Minnesota
  - Roads in Minnesota
    - U.S. Highways in Minnesota
    - Interstate Highways in Minnesota
    - State highways in Minnesota

== Education in Minnesota ==
Education in Minnesota

- Schools in Minnesota
  - School districts in Minnesota
    - High schools in Minnesota
  - Colleges and universities in Minnesota
    - University of Minnesota system
      - University of Minnesota
      - University of Minnesota Duluth
      - University of Minnesota Morris
      - University of Minnesota Crookston
      - University of Minnesota Rochester
    - Minnesota State Colleges and Universities system
      - St. Cloud State University
      - Minnesota State University, Mankato
      - Winona State University
      - Metropolitan State University
      - Minnesota State University Moorhead
      - Southwest Minnesota State University
      - Bemidji State University

== See also ==
- Topic overview:
  - Minnesota
  - Index of Minnesota-related articles
