= 1865 Minnesota Amendment 1 =

1865 Minnesota Amendment 1 was a legislatively referred constitutional amendment. It was the first of three attempts led by governor William Rainey Marshall to allow for Black suffrage in the state. The legislature initially approved the amendment for the ballot on February 24, 1865. The amendment failed with 54.70% of voters rejecting it.

== Results ==
Minnesota Amendment 1
Choice	Votes	%
For	12,135	45.30
Against	14,651	54.70
Total	26,786	100.00

== See also ==
- Electoral reform in Minnesota
