= Minnesotans' Military Appreciation Fund =

Fundraising initiative

Minnesotans’ Military Appreciation Fund (MMAF) is a nonprofit and nonpartisan statewide fundraising initiative that provides cash grants to Minnesota service members deployed in combat zones such as Iraq and Afghanistan, and to the families of fallen military personnel.

== History ==
MMAF officially began in August 2005. The effort was organized by the late Eugene Sit and three co-founders. The goal was to offer grants of $500 to every Minnesota military member who had been in a combat zone since 9/11, with $2,000 to $10,000 awarded to each wounded person, depending on the severity of injury, and $5,000 to the families of the fallen. The fund is believed to be the first of its kind in the nation. The first MMAF gala featured a keynote speech by Senator John McCain.

By 2007, MMAF announced that successful fundraising allowed it to double the amount of grants given to many Minnesota military members from $250 to $500. In 2008, MMAF planned to award 1,000 more grants. In March 2010, MMAF issued its 10,000th grant.

== Fundraising ==
Funding for MMAF has come from a combination of collections boxes, solicited donations and unsolicited contributions from corporations and individuals.
