= Island Station Power Plant =

Coordinates: 44°55′35″N 93°06′56″W

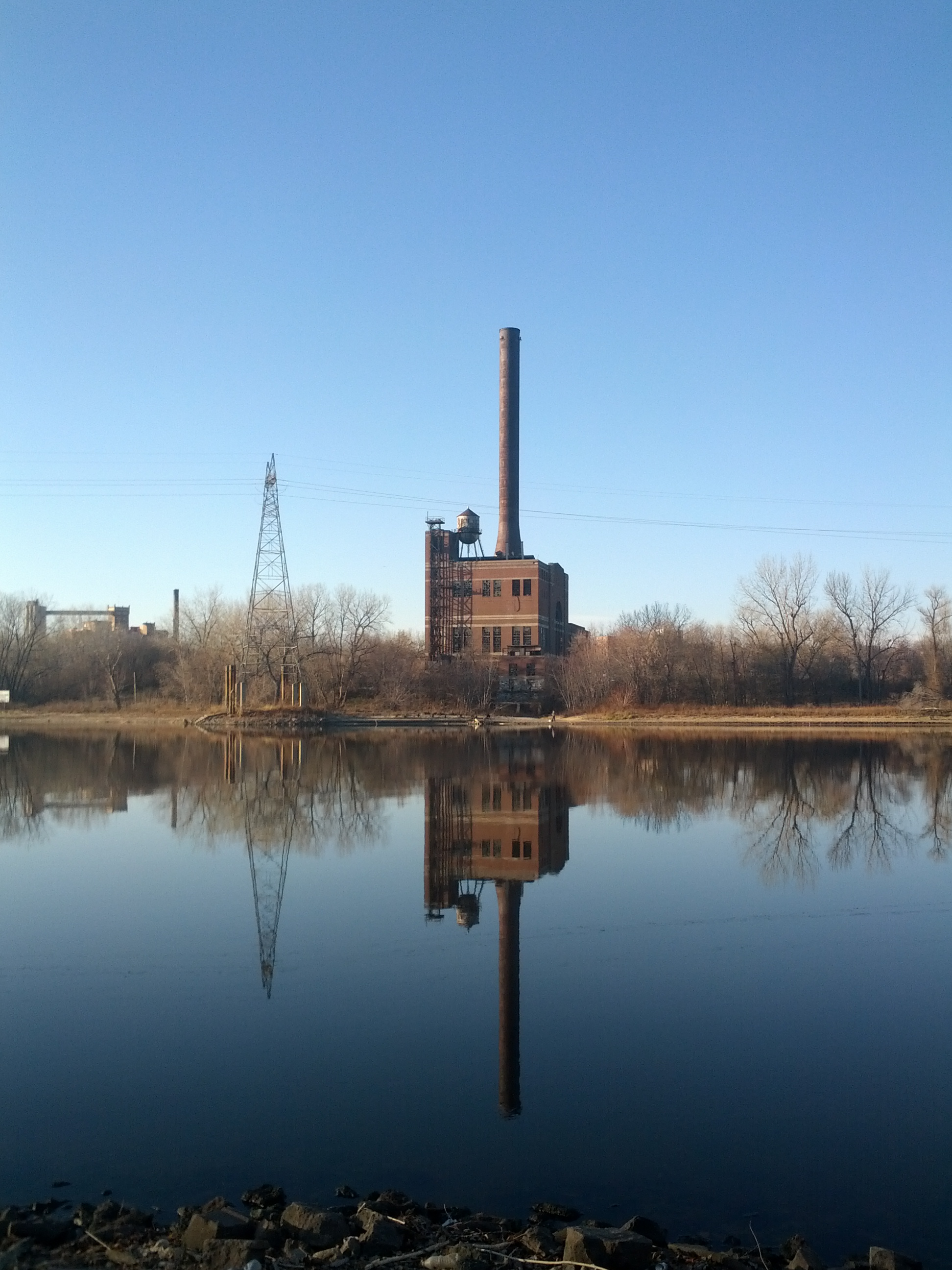
Island Station Power Plant seen from Lilydale Park across the Mississippi River

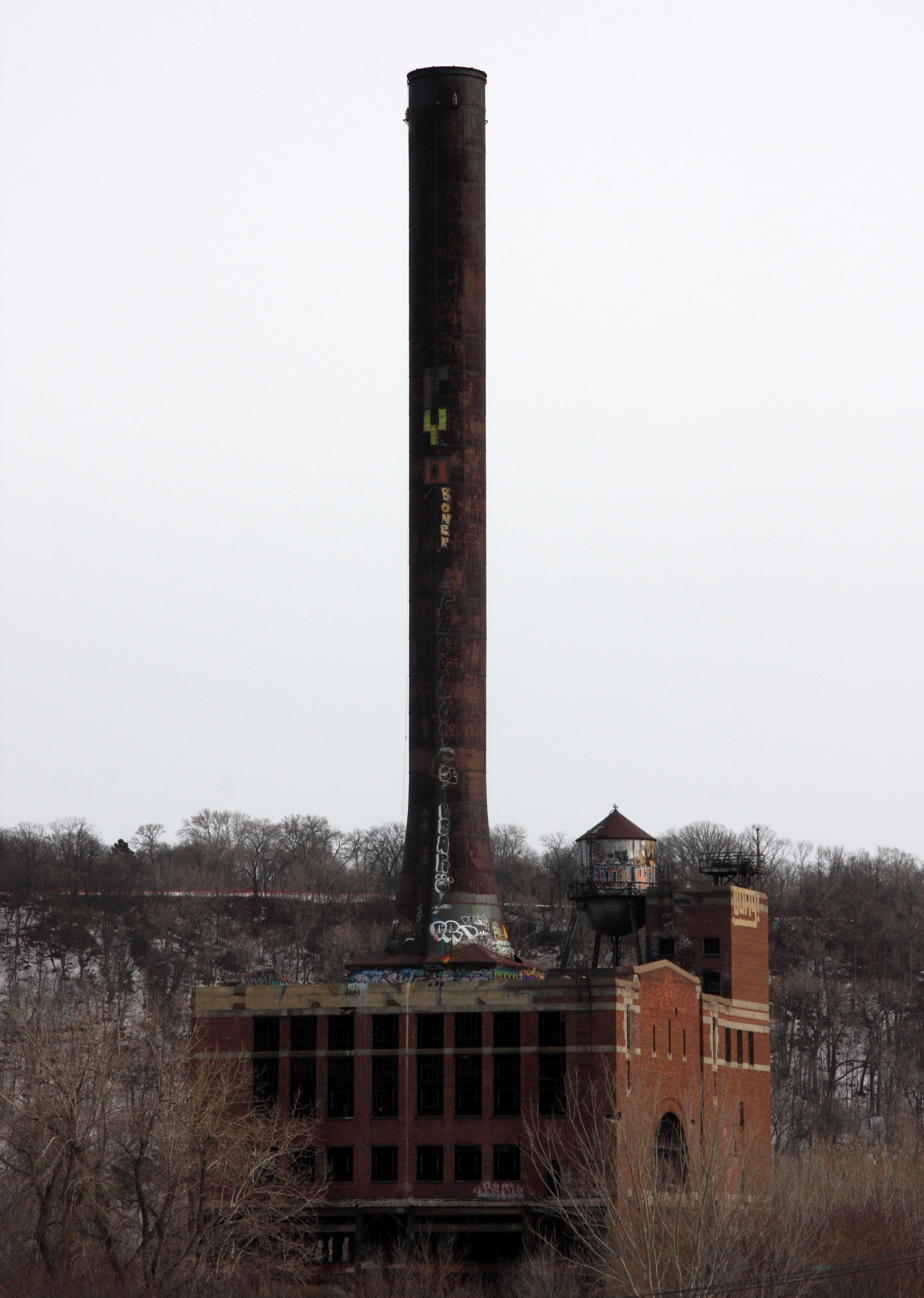
The plant the day before it was demolished in 2014

Island Station Power Plant was a coal power plant on the Mississippi River less than a mile up-river from downtown Saint Paul, Minnesota. St. Paul Gas & Light Company commissioned construction of the plant in 1921. In 1923, before construction was even complete, a more efficient technology for burning coal was developed, rendering the plant obsolete before it even opened.

The plant came online in 1926 and operated at three-fourths the intended capacity until 1943 when it was shifted to an off-peak use and only produced power 6–10 weeks per year. In 1975, Northern States Power Co. (who acquired the plant shortly after it was finished) decommissioned the plant and used it for storage.

In 1985 John Kerwin bought the plant and converted portions of the building into studio apartments for local artists. For a time a colony of a half-dozen to a dozen houseboat dwellers moored at the plant. In 2003 Island Station L.L.C. purchased the property for $1.5 million with the hope of turning it into a 235-unit condo with a 20-slip marina. After the $80 million project started work and more than 100 units had been reserved, the project stalled. In 2013, the property was sold for $4.05 million to St Paul Riverwalk, LLC of Scottsdale, Arizona. In February, 2014, a permit was authorized to demolish the plant. The entire structure was imploded on March 16, 2014, at 9:58 am.

== Tour the plant ==
- Set of exterior photos taken with permission and available on Flickr.
