= List of Minnesota aquatic plants =

Aquatic plants native to Minnesota:

== Algae ==
- Chara
- Filamentous algae
- Phytoplankton
- Stonewort

== Emergent plants ==
- Bulrushes
- Cattails
- Flowering rush Invasive aquatic plant
- Purple loosestrife Invasive aquatic plant
- Wild rice

== Floating-leaf plants ==
- Duckweed and watermeal
- Spatterdock
- Swamp smartweed
- Watershield
- White water lily
- Yellow lotus

== Submerged plants ==
- Broad-leaf pondweeds
- Bushy pondweeds and naiads
- Canada waterweed
- Coontail
- Curly-leaf pondweed Invasive aquatic plant
- Eurasian watermilfoil Invasive aquatic plant
- Narrow-leaf pondweeds
- Northern watermilfoil
- Wild celery

== See also ==
- List of Minnesota rivers
- List of lakes in Minnesota
- List of invasive species in North America
