= List of Minnesota Twins first-round draft picks =

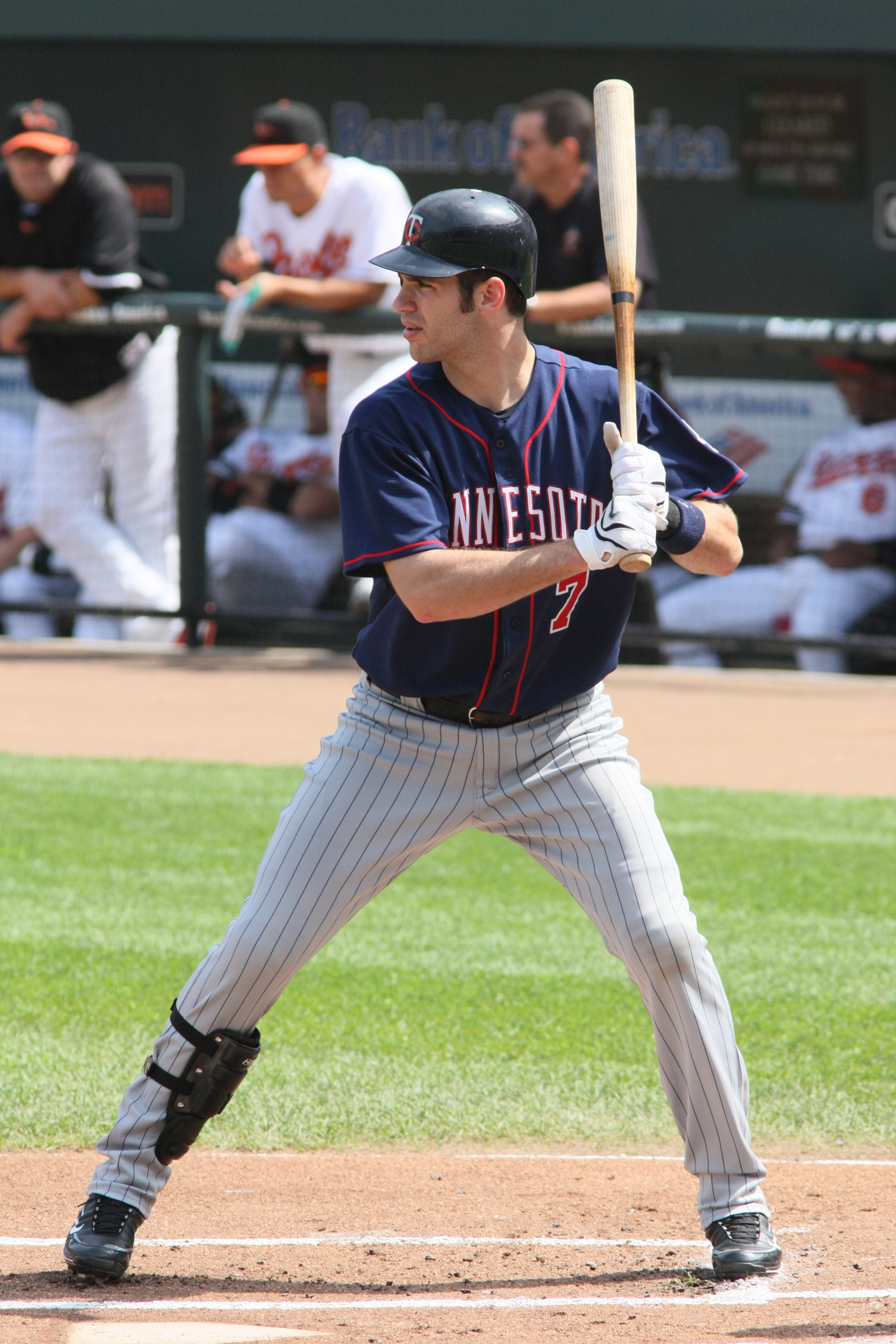
Joe Mauer, the Twins' first-overall selection in the 2001 draft, won an MVP, two Gold Gloves, three Silver Sluggers, and three batting titles.

The Minnesota Twins are a Major League Baseball (MLB) franchise based in Minneapolis, Minnesota, playing in the American League Central division. Since the institution of MLB's Rule 4 Draft, the Twins have selected 70 players in the first round. Officially known as the "First-Year Player Draft", the Rule 4 Draft is MLB's primary mechanism for assigning players from high schools, colleges, and other amateur clubs to its franchises. The draft order is determined based on the previous season's standings, with the team possessing the worst record receiving the first pick. In addition, teams which lost free agents in the previous off-season may be awarded compensatory or supplementary picks.

Of the 70 players picked in the first round by Minnesota, 30 have been pitchers, the most of any position; 22 of these were right-handed, while 8 were left-handed. Twelve outfielders were selected, while twelve shortstops, seven third basemen, four catchers, four first basemen and one second baseman were taken as well. Thirteen of the players came from high schools or universities in the state of California, nine came from schools in Florida, and six came from Arizona, including five players selected from Arizona State University.

Two of the Twins' first-round picks have won championships with the franchise: Willie Banks (1987) and Chuck Knoblauch (1989) won a World Series title on the 1991 championship team. Knoblauch is also the only first-round draft pick of the Twins to win the MLB Rookie of the Year award, taking home the award in 1991. Catcher Joe Mauer (2001) is the only Twins first round draft pick to be elected to the Baseball Hall of Fame, earning enshrinement in 2024. In 2009, Mauer won the American League Most Valuable Player award, the only first-round pick of the Twins to win the award. Mauer has also won three Silver Slugger Awards and two Rawlings Gold Glove Awards, and he is the only catcher in MLB history to win three batting titles.

The Twins have made 16 selections in the supplemental round of the draft and have made the first overall selection three times (1983, 2001, and 2017). They have also had 18 compensatory picks since the institution of the First-Year Player Draft in 1965. These additional picks are provided when a team loses a particularly valuable free agent in the previous off-season,^{[V]} or, more recently, if a team fails to sign a draft pick from the previous year. The Twins have six times failed to sign their first-round pick. Eddie Leon (1965), Dick Ruthven (1972), Jamie Allen (1976), and Tim Belcher (1983) all failed to sign with the Twins without the team receiving compensation. The Twins did, however, receive a compensatory pick when they failed to sign Jason Varitek (1993), who instead chose to enter the draft again the following year and was taken by the Seattle Mariners. Additionally, Travis Lee, the Twins' only selection in 1996 and the second-overall pick of that draft, did not sign with the team. Lee's agent, Scott Boras, did not communicate with the Twins for the first two weeks after the draft and then invoked a rarely used rule that a team was required to make a contract offer within 15 days of the draft or relinquish their rights to the player. As a result, Lee and 3 other 1996 first-round picks who were Boras clients were granted free agency and he ultimately signed with the Arizona Diamondbacks.

== Key ==
Year	Each year links to an article about that year's Major League Baseball draft.
Position	Indicates the secondary/collegiate position at which the player was drafted, rather than the professional position the player may have gone on to play
Pick	Indicates the number of the pick
*	Player did not sign with the Twins
§	Indicates a supplemental pick
†	Member of the National Baseball Hall of Fame

== Picks ==
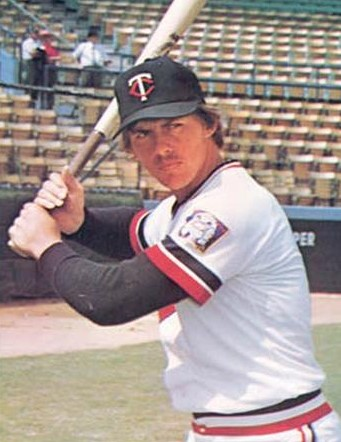
Steve Brye (1967) was the first player selected by the Twins in the first round to sign with and reach the majors with the Twins.

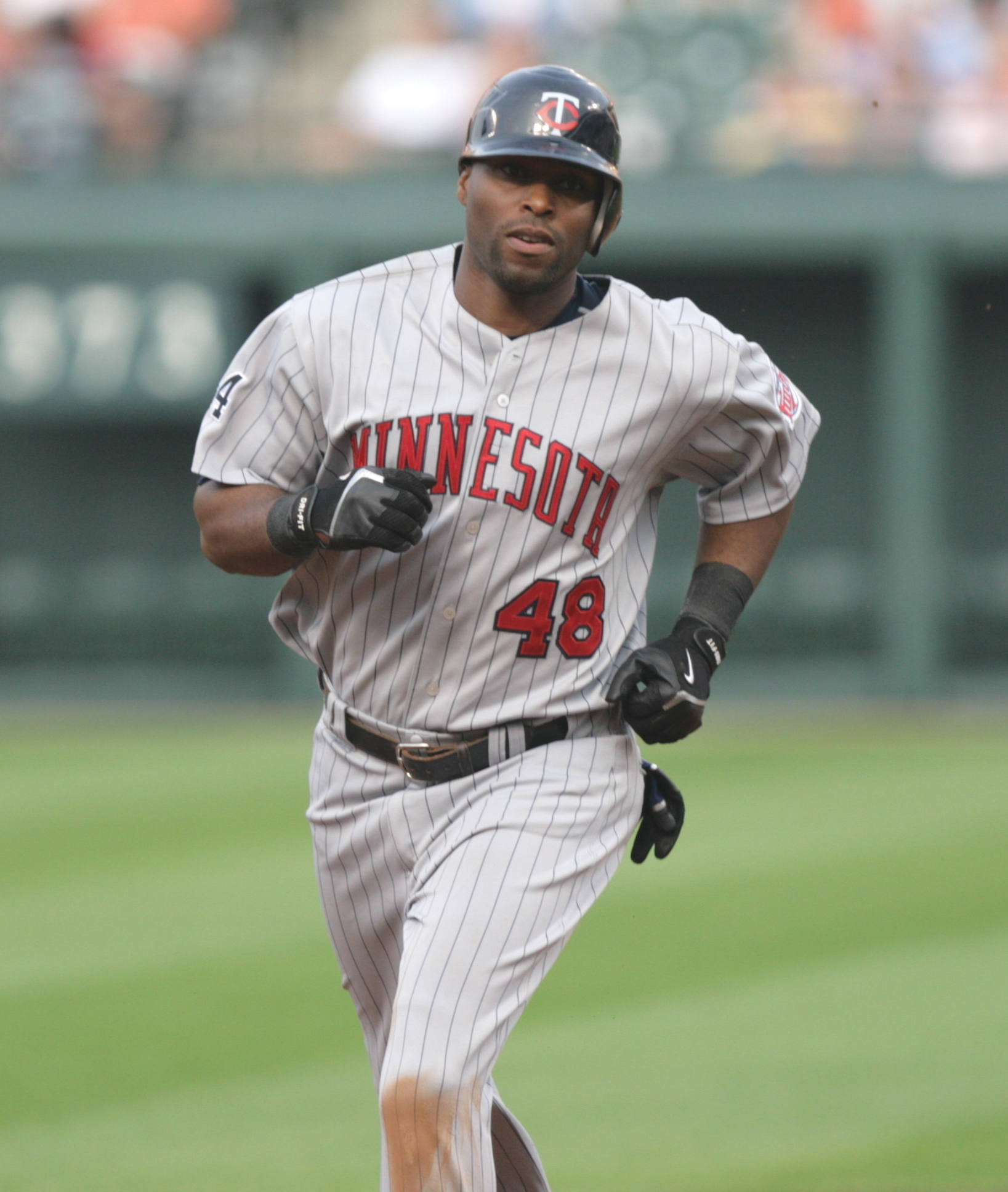
Torii Hunter was one of four players drafted by the Twins in the first round of the 1993 draft.

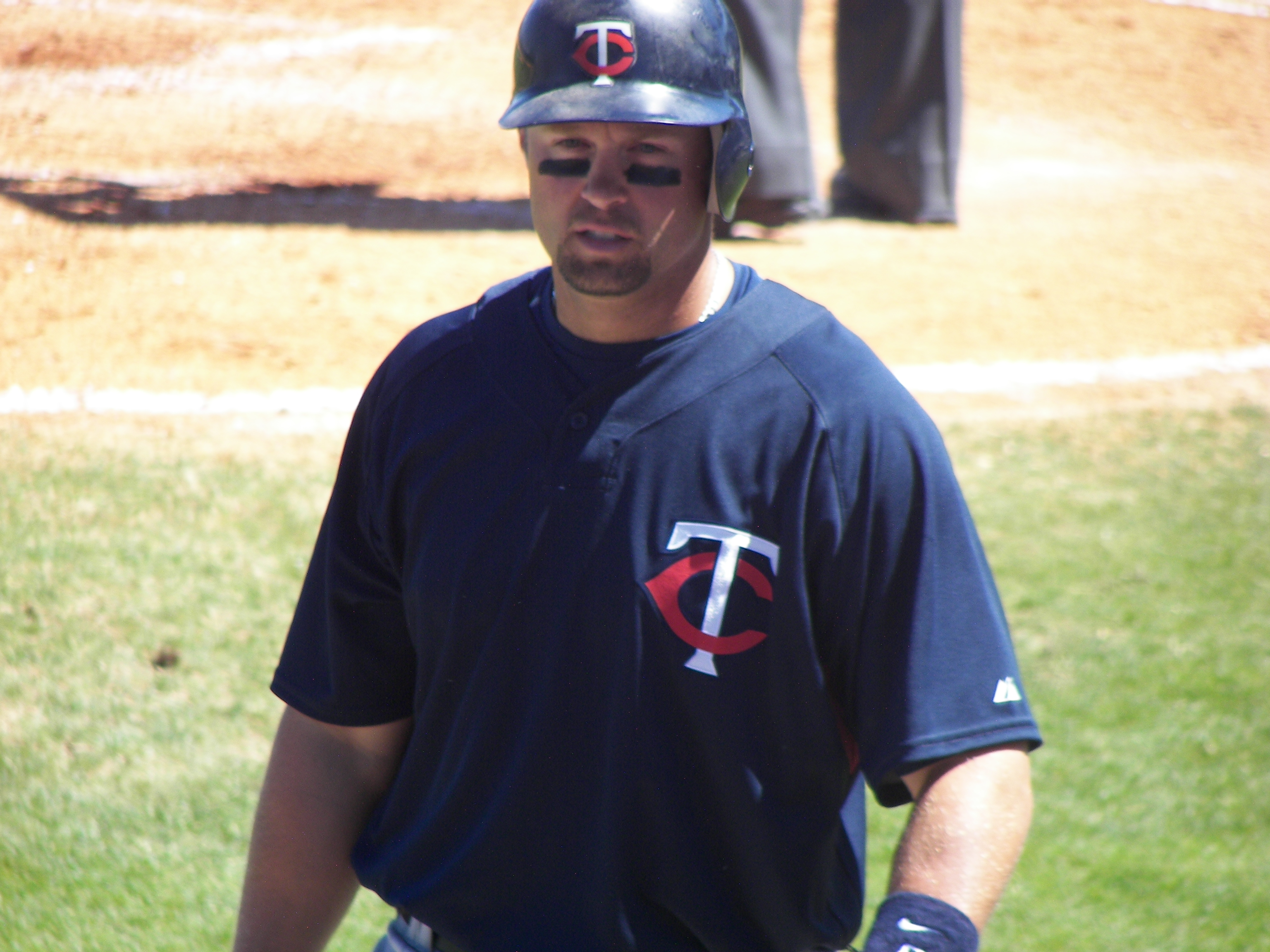
Michael Cuddyer (1997) was drafted as a shortstop but has never played a major league game at that position.

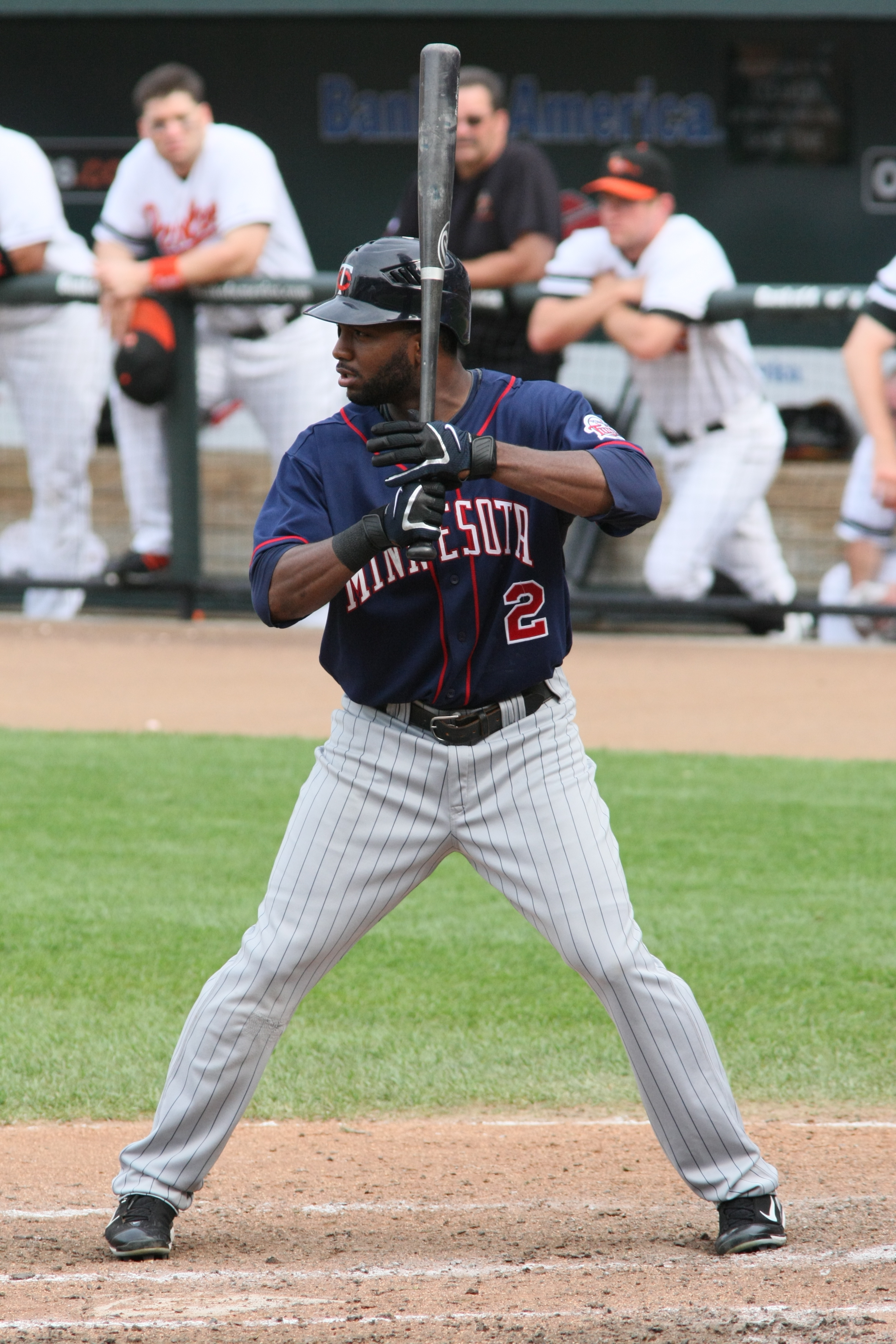
Denard Span's selection in 2002 was one of five times the Twins made the 20th pick of the draft.

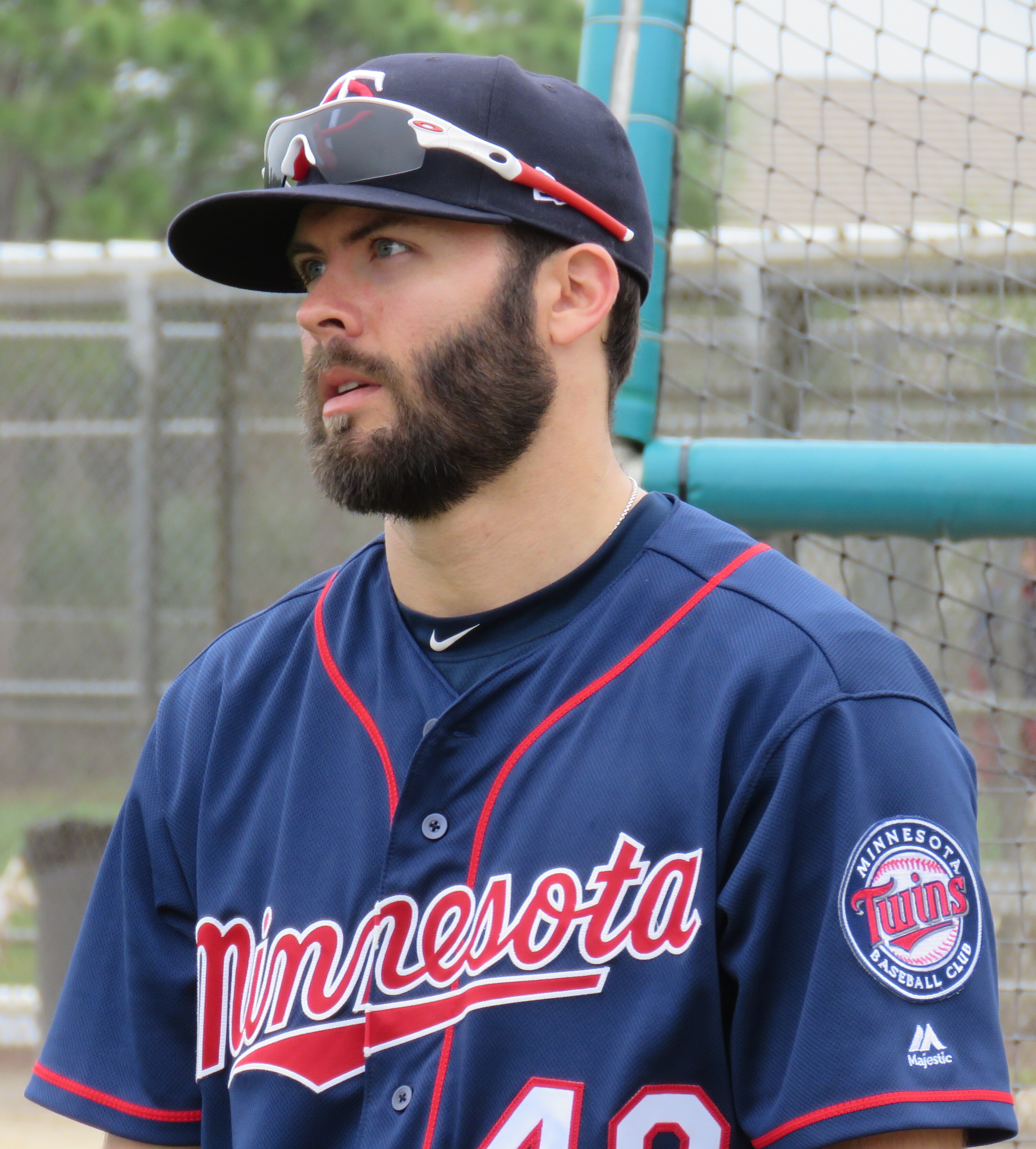
Levi Michael was the first of Minnesota's three picks in the first round of the 2011 draft who would not reach the majors.

Year	Name	Position	School (Location)	Pick	Ref
1965	Eddie Leon*	Shortstop	University of Arizona (Tucson, Arizona)	9	
1966	Bob Jones	Third baseman	(Dawson, Georgia)	20	
1967	Steve Brye	Third baseman	St. Elizabeth High School (Oakland, California)	17	
1968	Alex Rowell	Outfielder	Luther College (Decorah, Iowa)	16	
1969	Paul Powell	Outfielder	Arizona State University (Tempe, Arizona)	7	
1970	Bob Gorinski	Shortstop	Mount Pleasant High School (Calumet, Pennsylvania)	22	
1971	Dale Soderholm	Shortstop	Miami Coral Park High School (Miami, Florida)	21	
1972	Dick Ruthven*	Right-handed pitcher	California State University, Fresno (Fresno, California)	8	
1973	Eddie Bane	Left-handed pitcher	Arizona State University (Tempe, Arizona)	11	
1974	Ted Shipley	Shortstop	Vanderbilt University (Nashville, Tennessee)	14	
1975	Rick Sofield	Shortstop	Morristown High School (Morristown, New Jersey)	13	
1976	Jamie Allen*	Third baseman	Davis High School (Yakima, Washington)	10	
1977	Paul Croft	Outfielder	Morristown High School (Morristown, New Jersey)	15	
1978	Lenny Faedo	Shortstop	Jefferson High School (Tampa, Florida)	16	
1979	Kevin Brandt	Outfielder	Nekoosa High School (Nekoosa, Wisconsin)	11	
1980	Jeff Reed	Catcher	Joliet West High School (Joliet, Illinois	12	
1981	Mike Sodders	Third baseman	Arizona State University (Tempe, Arizona)	11	
1982	Bryan Oelkers	Left-handed pitcher	Wichita State University (Wichita, Kansas)	4	
1983	Tim Belcher*	Right-handed pitcher	Mount Vernon Nazarene College (Mount Vernon, Ohio)	1	
1984	Jay Bell	Shortstop	Gonzalez Tate High School (Pensacola, Florida)	8	
1985	Jeff Bumgarner	Right-handed pitcher	Hanford High School (West Richland, Washington)	13	
1986	Derek Parks	Right-handed pitcher	Montclair High School (Montclair, California)	10	
1987	Willie Banks	Right-handed pitcher	St. Anthony's High School (Jersey City, New Jersey)	3	
1988	Johnny Ard	Right-handed pitcher	Manatee Community College (Bradenton, Florida)	20	
1989	Chuck Knoblauch	Shortstop	Texas A&M University (College Station, Texas)	25	
1990	Todd Ritchie	Right-handed pitcher	Duncanville High School (Duncanville, Texas)	12	
1990	Midre Cummings	Outfielder	Edison High School (Miami, Florida)	29^{§}^{[a]}	
1991	Dave McCarty	First baseman	Stanford University (Stanford, California)	3	
1991	Scott Stahoviak	Third baseman	Creighton University (Omaha, Nebraska)	27^{§}^{[b]}	
1992	Dan Serafini	Left-handed pitcher	Serra High School (San Mateo, California)	26	
1993	Torii Hunter	Outfielder	Pine Bluff High School (Pine Bluff, Arkansas)	20^{[c]}	
1993	Jason Varitek*	Catcher	Georgia Institute of Technology (Atlanta, Georgia)	21	
1993	Marc Barcelo	Right-handed pitcher	Arizona State University (Tempe, Arizona)	33^{§}^{[d]}	
1993	Kelcey Mucker	Outfielder	Lawrenceburg High School (Lawrenceburg, Indiana)	38^{§}^{[e]}	
1994	Todd Walker	Second baseman	Louisiana State University (Baton Rouge, Louisiana)	8	
1994	Travis Miller	Left-handed pitcher	Kent State University (Kent, Ohio)	34^{§}^{[f]}	
1995	Mark Redman	Left-handed pitcher	University of Oklahoma (Norman, Oklahoma)	13	
1996	Travis Lee*	First baseman	San Diego State University (San Diego, California)	2	
1997	Michael Cuddyer	Shortstop	Great Bridge High School (Chesapeake, Virginia)	9	
1997	Matt LeCroy	Catcher	Clemson University (Clemson, South Carolina)	50^{§}^{[g]}	
1998	Ryan Mills	Left-handed pitcher	Arizona State University (Tempe, Arizona)	6	
1999	B.J. Garbe	Outfielder	Moses Lake High School (Moses Lake, Washington)	5	
2000	Adam Johnson	Right-handed pitcher	California State University, Fullerton (Fullerton, California)	2	
2000	Aaron Heilman*	Right-handed pitcher	University of Notre Dame (Notre Dame, Indiana)	31^{§}^{[h]}	
2001	Joe Mauer^{†}	Catcher	Cretin-Derham Hall (St. Paul, Minnesota)	1	
2002	Denard Span	Outfielder	Tampa Catholic High School (Tampa, Florida)	20	
2003	Matthew Moses	Third baseman	Mills E. Godwin High School (Richmond, Virginia)	21	
2004	Trevor Plouffe	Shortstop	Crespi Carmelite High School (Encino, California)	20	
2004	Glen Perkins	Left-handed pitcher	University of Minnesota (Minneapolis, Minnesota)	22^{[i]}	
2004	Steven Waldrop	Right-handed pitcher	Farragut High School (Knoxville, Tennessee)	25^{[j]}	
2004	Matthew Fox	Right-handed pitcher	University of Central Florida (Orlando, Florida)	35^{§}^{[k]}	
2004	Jay Rainville	Right-handed pitcher	Bishop Hendricken High School (Warwick, Rhode Island)	39^{§}^{[l]}	
2005	Matt Garza	Right-handed pitcher	California State University, Fresno (Fresno, California)	25	
2005	Henry Sanchez	First baseman	Mission Bay High School (San Diego, California)	39^{§}^{[m]}	
2006	Chris Parmelee	Outfielder	Chino Hills High School (Chino Hills, California)	20	
2007	Ben Revere	Outfielder	Lexington Catholic High School (Lexington, Kentucky)	28	
2008	Aaron Hicks	Outfielder	Wilson High School (Long Beach, California)	14	
2008	Carlos Gutiérrez	Right-handed pitcher	University of Miami (Coral Gables, Florida)	27^{[n]}	
2008	Shooter Hunt	Right-handed pitcher	Tulane University (New Orleans, Louisiana)	31^{§}^{[o]}	
2009	Kyle Gibson	Right-handed pitcher	University of Missouri (Columbia, Missouri)	22	
2009	Matthew Bashore	Left-handed pitcher	Indiana University Bloomington (Bloomington, Indiana)	46^{§}^{[p]}	
2010	Alex Wimmers	Right-handed pitcher	Ohio State University (Columbus, Ohio)	21	
2011	Levi Michael	Shortstop	University of North Carolina at Chapel Hill (Chapel Hill, North Carolina)	30	
2011	Travis Harrison	Third baseman	Tustin High School (Tustin, California)	50^{§}^{[q]}	
2011	Hudson Boyd	Right-handed pitcher	Bishop Verot High School (Fort Myers, Florida)	55^{§}^{[r]}	
2012	Byron Buxton	Outfielder	Appling County High School (Baxley, Georgia)	2	
2012	José Berríos	Right-handed pitcher	Papa Juan High School (Bayamón, Puerto Rico)	32^{§}^{[s]}	
2012	Luke Bard	Right-handed pitcher	Georgia Institute of Technology (Atlanta, Georgia)	42^{§}^{[t]}	
2013	Kohl Stewart	Right-handed pitcher	St. Pius X High School (Houston, Texas)	4	
2014	Nick Gordon	Shortstop	Olympia High School (Orlando, Florida)	5	
2015	Tyler Jay	Left-handed pitcher	University of Illinois at Urbana-Champaign (Champaign, Illinois)	6	
2016	Alex Kirilloff	Outfielder	Plum High School (Pittsburgh, Pennsylvania)	15	
2017	Royce Lewis	Shortstop	JSerra Catholic High School (San Juan Capistrano, California)	1	
2017	Brent Rooker	Outfielder	Mississippi State University (Mississippi State, Mississippi)	35	
2018	Trevor Larnach	Outfielder	Oregon State University (Corvallis, Oregon)	20	
2019	Keoni Cavaco	Shortstop	Eastlake High School (Chula Vista, California)	13	
2020	Aaron Sabato	First baseman	University of North Carolina (Chapel Hill, North Carolina)	27	
2021	Chase Petty	Right-handed pitcher	Mainland Regional High School (Linwood, New Jersey)	26	
2021	Noah Miller	Shortstop	Ozaukee High School (Fredonia, Wisconsin)	36^{§}^{[s]}	
2022	Brooks Lee	Shortstop	Cal Poly (San Luis Obispo, California)	8	
2023	Walker Jenkins	Outfielder	South Brunswick High School (Southport, North Carolina)	5	
2023	Charlee Soto	Right-Handed pitcher	Reborn Christian Academy (Kissimmee, Florida)	34^{§}^{[s]}	
2024	Kaelen Culpepper	Shortstop	Kansas State University (Manhattan, Kansas)	20	
2025	Marek Houston	Shortstop	Wake Forest University (Winston-Salem, North Carolina)	16	
2025	Riley Quick	Right-Handed pitcher	University of Alabama (Tuscaloosa, Alabama)	36^{§}^{[s]}	
2026	Vahn Lackey	Catcher	Georgia Institute of Technology (Atlanta, Georgia)	3	

== See also ==
- Minnesota Twins minor league players

== Footnotes ==
- ^{V} Through the 2012 draft, free agents were evaluated by the Elias Sports Bureau and rated "Type A", "Type B", or not compensation-eligible. If a team offered arbitration to a player but that player refused and subsequently signed with another team, the original team was able to receive additional draft picks. If a "Type A" free agent left in this way, his previous team received a supplemental pick and a compensatory pick from the team with which he signed. If a "Type B" free agent left in this way, his previous team received only a supplemental pick. Since the 2013 draft, free agents are no longer classified by type; instead, compensatory picks are only awarded if the team offered its free agent a contract worth at least the average of the 125 current richest MLB contracts. However, if the free agent's last team acquired the player in a trade during the last year of his contract, it is ineligible to receive compensatory picks for that player.
- ^{a} The Twins gained a supplemental first-round pick in 1990 for losing free agent Jeff Reardon.
- ^{b} The Twins gained a supplemental first-round pick in 1991 for losing free agent Gary Gaetti.
- ^{c} The Twins gained a compensatory first-round pick in 1993 from the Cincinnati Reds for losing free agent John Smiley.
- ^{d} The Twins gained a supplemental first-round pick in 1993 for losing free agent John Smiley.
- ^{e} The Twins gained a supplemental first-round pick in 1993 for losing free agent Greg Gagne.
- ^{f} The Twins gained a supplemental first-round pick in 1994 for failing to sign 1993 first-round pick Jason Varitek.
- ^{g} The Twins gained a supplemental first-round pick in 1997 for failing to sign 1996 first-round pick Travis Lee.
- ^{h} The Twins gained a supplemental first-round pick in 2000 for losing free agent Mike Trombley.
- ^{i} The Twins gained a compensatory first-round pick in 2004 from the Seattle Mariners for losing free agent Eddie Guardado.
- ^{j} The Twins gained a compensatory first-round pick in 2004 from the Chicago Cubs for losing free agent LaTroy Hawkins.
- ^{k} The Twins gained a supplemental first-round pick in 2004 for losing free agent Eddie Guardado.
- ^{l} The Twins gained a supplemental first-round pick in 2004 for losing free agent LaTroy Hawkins.
- ^{m} The Twins gained a supplemental first-round pick in 2005 for losing free agent Corey Koskie.
- ^{n} The Twins gained a compensatory first-round pick in 2008 from the Los Angeles Angels of Anaheim for losing free agent Torii Hunter.
- ^{o} The Twins gained a supplemental first-round pick in 2008 for losing free agent Torii Hunter.
- ^{p} The Twins gained a supplemental first-round pick in 2009 for losing free agent Dennys Reyes.
- ^{q} The Twins gained a supplemental first-round pick in 2011 for losing free agent Orlando Hudson.
- ^{r} The Twins gained a supplemental first-round pick in 2011 for losing free agent Jesse Crain.
- ^{s} The Twins gained a supplemental first-round pick in 2012 for losing free agent Michael Cuddyer.
- ^{t} The Twins gained a supplemental first-round pick in 2012 for losing free agent Jason Kubel.
