= Electoral reform in Minnesota =

Electoral reform in Minnesota refers to efforts to change the voting and election laws.

== Alternate voting systems ==
In 2006, voters in Minneapolis approved a switch to instant runoff voting by a 65% to 35% margin. The measure calls for IRV to be used in elections for Mayor, City Council, and members of the Park and Recreation Board, Library Board, and Board of Estimate and Taxation. It also rolls the party primary and general election into one election.

== Expansion of the electorate ==
Minnesota's felony disenfranchisement laws call for voting rights to be restored upon completion of sentence, including prison, parole, and probation. Minnesota allows absentee ballots for citizens who are away from home, ill or disabled, serving as an election judge in another precinct, or unable to go to the polling place due to a religious observance or belief.

== Allocation of electoral votes ==
Bills were introduced in 2009 in the Minnesota Legislature to join the National Popular Vote Interstate Compact and award Minnesota's 10 electoral votes to the ticket winning the nationwide popular vote. However, the bill died in the House committee.

== Ballot access ==
Major party candidates are nominated by the state primary process. Independent and minor political party candidates are nominated by a petition process; two-thousand signatures for a statewide election, or five hundred for a state legislative election. Candidates have a two-week period to collect nominating petition signatures. Independent candidates may select a brief political party designation in lieu of independent. Reformers would like to see the ballot access laws loosened.

== See also ==
Electoral reform in the United States
