= List of amphibians of Minnesota =

List of Minnesota amphibians lists all of the salamanders, frogs, and toads found in Minnesota.

== Salamanders ==
There are eight species of salamanders in Minnesota.

| Common name | Scientific name | Status | Distribution | Size | Picture |
|---|---|---|---|---|---|
| Spotted salamander | Ambystoma maculatum | Special Concern | Pine and Carlton Counties | 6-8 inches (15–20 cm) | |
| Blue-spotted salamander | Ambystoma laterale | Least concern | Throughout the state, excluding southwestern prairies | 4-5.5 inches (10–14 cm) | |
| Western tiger salamander | Ambystoma mavortium | Least concern | Extreme western Minnesota | 6-8 inches (15–20 cm) | |
| Eastern tiger salamander | Ambystoma tigrinum | Least concern | Throughout the state, excluding the northeast Arrowhead Region | 6-8 inches (15–20 cm) | |
| Four-toed salamander | Hemidactylium scutatum | Special concern | Mille Lacs north to Itasca County, east to southern St. Louis County | 6-8 inches (15–20 cm) | |
| Common mudpuppy | Necturus maculosus | Least concern | Scattered throughout, excluding the Arrowhead Region. | 8-13 inches (20–33 cm) | |
| Central newt | Notophthalmus viridescens | Least concern | Scattered populations, absent from southwestern prairies | 2.5-4 inches (6–10 cm) | |
| Red-backed salamander | Plethodon cinereus | Least concern | Throughout northeast Minnesota | 6-8 inches (15–20 cm) | |

== Frogs ==
There are eleven species of frogs in Minnesota.

| Common name | Scientific name | Status | Distribution | Size | Picture |
|---|---|---|---|---|---|
| Blanchard's cricket frog | Acris blanchardi | Least concern, endangered in Minnesota | Southeast and extreme southwest Minnesota | 1-1.25 inches (2.5–3 cm) | |
| Cope's gray treefrog | Hyla chrysoscelis | Least concern | Throughout the state, excluding northeast | 1-2 inches (2.5–5 cm) | |
| Gray treefrog | Hyla versicolor | Least concern | Throughout the state, excluding southwest | 1-2 inches (2.5–5 cm) | |
| Spring peeper | Pseudacris crucifer | Least concern | Throughout the state, excluding southwest | ~1 inch (2.5 cm) | |
| Boreal chorus frog | Pseudacris maculata | Least concern | Throughout the state | 1-1.25 inches (2.5–3 cm) | |
| Bullfrog | Lithobates catesbeianus | Least concern | Native only to Houston and Winona Counties, introduced throughout southern Minnesota | 5-7 inches (13–18 cm) | |
| Green frog | Lithobates clamitans | Least concern | Throughout the state, excluding southwestern prairies | 2-4 inches (5–10 cm) | |
| Pickerel frog | Lithobates palustris | Least concern | Southeastern Minnesota | 1.75-3 inches (4.5-7.5 cm) | |
| Northern leopard frog | Lithobates pipiens | Least concern | Throughout the state | 2-3.5 inches (5–9 cm) | |
| Mink frog | Lithobates septentrionalis | Least concern | Minnesota north of Twin Cities | 2-4 inches (5–10 cm) | |
| Wood frog | Lithobates sylvaticus | Least concern | Throughout the state, excluding the far southwestern counties | 2-3 inches (5-7.5 cm) | |

== Toads ==
There are three species of toads in Minnesota.

| Common name | Scientific name | Status | Distribution | Size | Picture |
|---|---|---|---|---|---|
| American toad | Anaxyrus americanus | Least concern | Throughout the state | 2-3.5 inches (5–9 cm) | |
| Great Plains toad | Anaxyrus cognatus | Special Concern | Far western Minnesota | 2-3 inches (5-7.5 cm) | |
| Canadian toad | Anaxyrus hemiophrys | Least concern | Far western Minnesota, north from Yellow Medicine County | 2-3.5 inces (5–9 cm) | |
