= Wind power in Minnesota =

Electricity from wind in one U.S. state

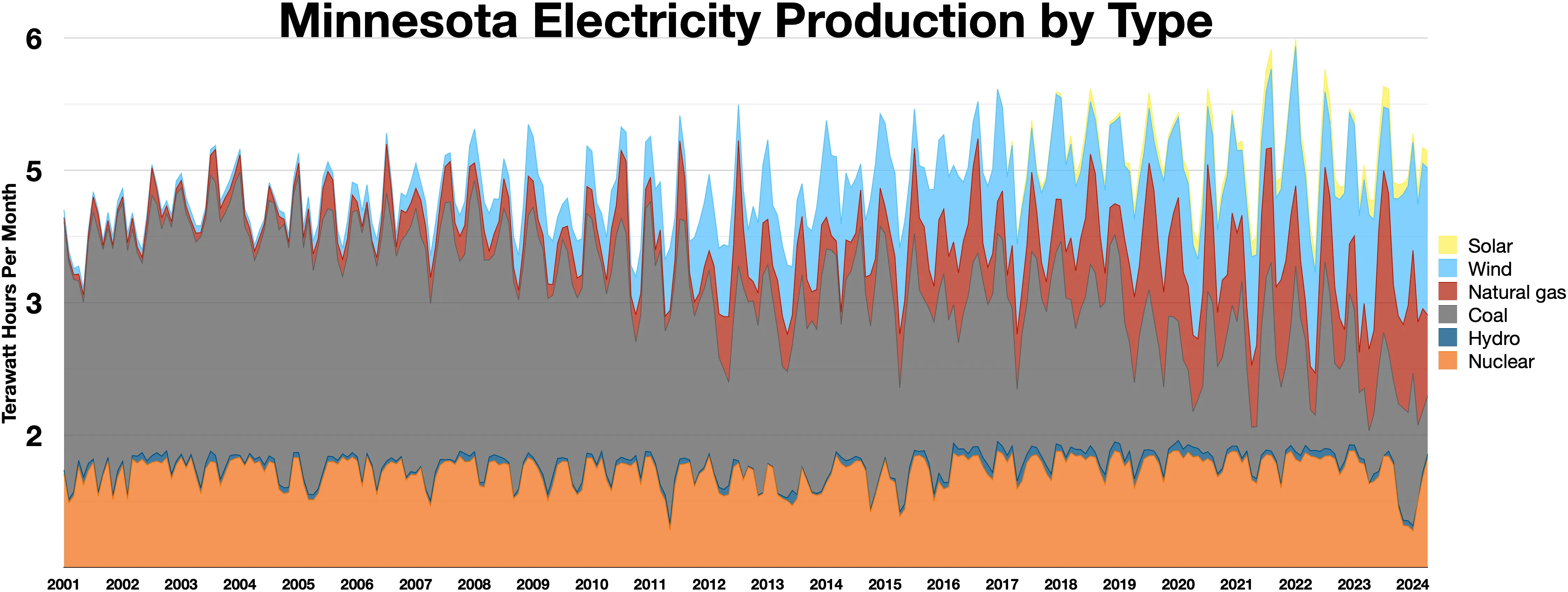
Minnesota electricity production by type

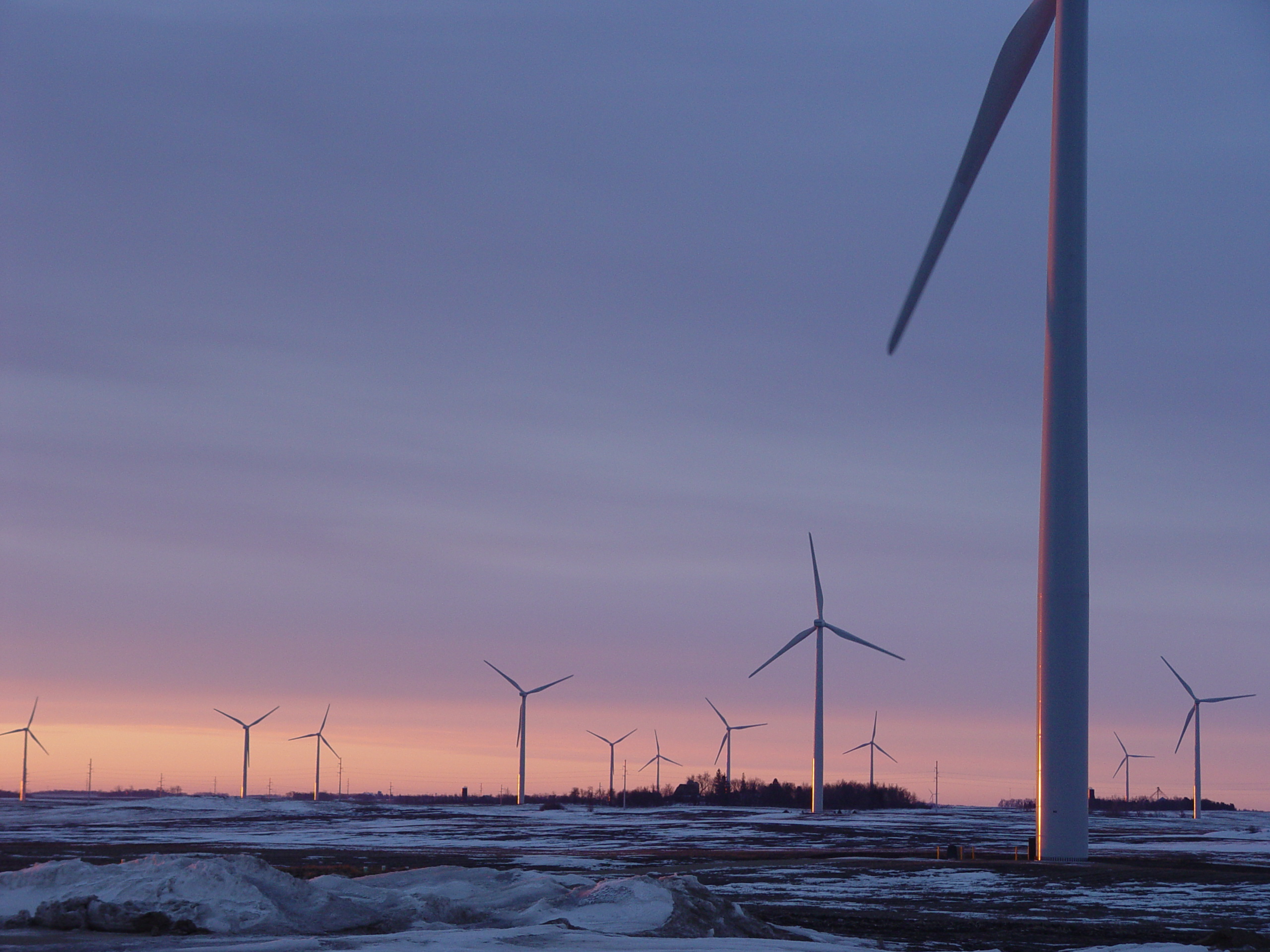
Fenton wind farm at sunrise

As of 2023, the installed capacity for wind power in Minnesota was more than 4500 megawatts (MW). Wind power generated 25 percent of Minnesota’s electricity in 2023, ranking among the top ten states in the United States for wind energy as a share of total electricity generation.

Large wind farms in Minnesota include the Buffalo Ridge Wind Farm (225 MW), Fenton Wind Farm (205.5 MW), Nobles Wind Farm (201 MW), Odell Wind Farm (200 MW), and Bent Tree Wind Farm (201 MW).

== Transmission grid improvements ==
Minnesota electricity generation sources in 2016

The CapX2020 project (capacity expansion 2020) is developing the transmission grid infrastructure to improve capacity, reliability, and support further wind power development. The project is mostly in Minnesota, but reaches into North Dakota, South Dakota, and Wisconsin as well. One phase of the project, a line from Monticello to St. Cloud, was completed in 2011. Other lines will run from near Brookings, South Dakota to Hampton, Minnesota; from Fargo, North Dakota to St. Cloud; and from La Crosse, Wisconsin to Hampton. The project involves constructing about 590 miles of 345 kV transmission line and 68 miles of 238 kV transmission line. CapX2020 was expected to be completed around 2015. in

Minnesota has a renewable portfolio standard (400 Mega volt amperes) requiring that 25% of electricity come from renewable sources by 2025.

== Statistics ==
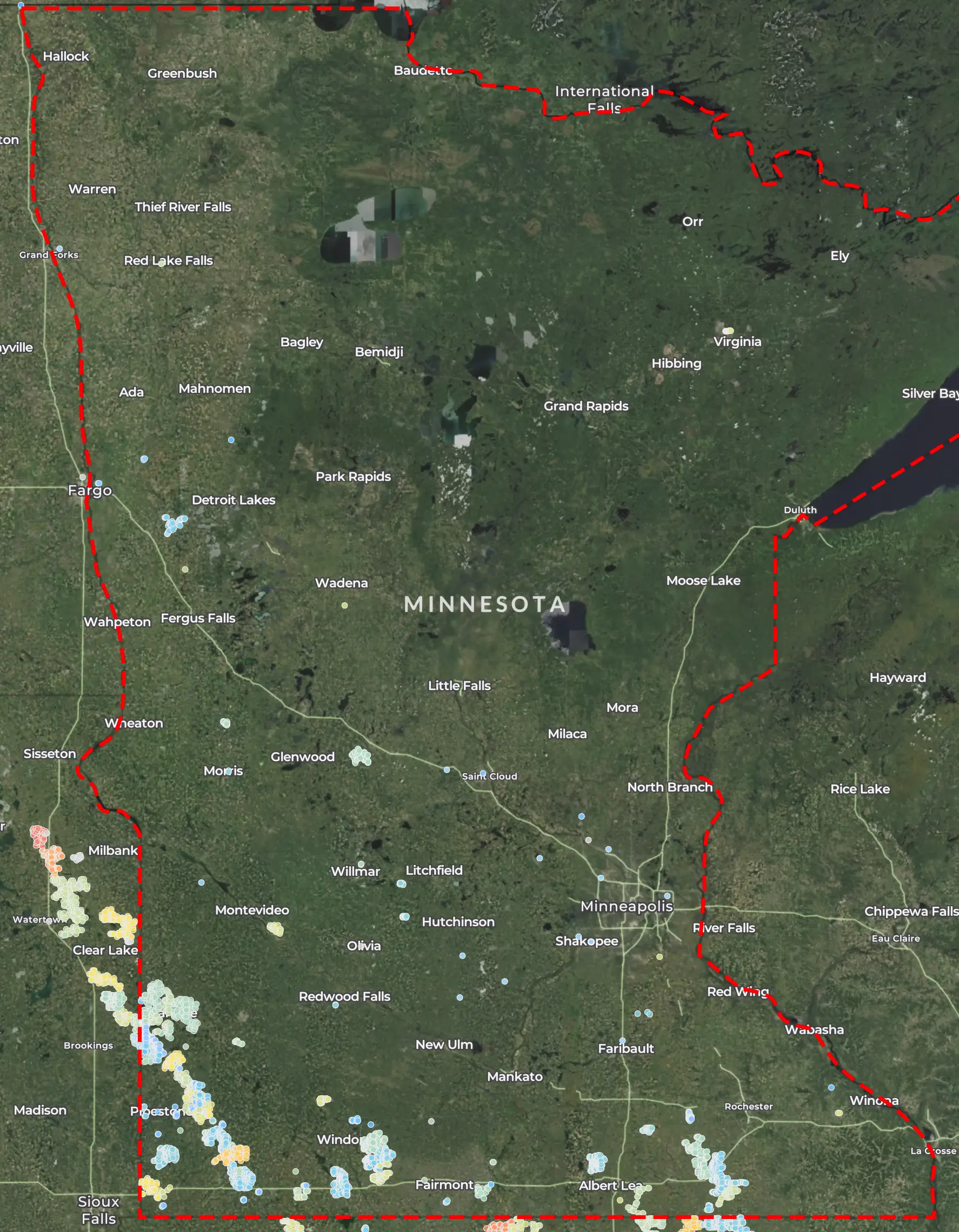
Minnesota wind power

Wind power in Minnesota
Year	Capacity (MW)	Generation (GWh)	Generation (% of total)
1999	273.4		
2000	291.2	725	1.4%
2001	319.8	884	1.8%
2002	337.7	905	1.7%
2003	558.3	979	1.8%
2004	600.1	814	1.6%
2005	745.4	1,582	3%
2006	895.9	2,055	3.9%
2007	1,299.8	2,638	4.8%
2008	1,752.8	4,354	8%
2009	1,810	5,053	9.6%
2010	2,205.4	4,791	8.9%
2011	2,718	6,725	12.7%
2012	2,987	8,176	14.6%
2013	2,987	8,258	16.1%
2014	3,035	9,690	17%
2015	3,235	9,781	17.2%
2016	3,526	9,934	17.7%
2017	3,699	11,136	
2018	3,779	10,712	
2019	3,843	11,040	19%
2020	4,299	11,832	21.6%
2021	4,591	12,942	
2022		14,275	

Minnesota wind generation (GWh, million kWh)
Year	Total	Jan	Feb	Mar	Apr	May	Jun	Jul	Aug	Sep	Oct	Nov	Dec
2001	884	86	73	67	91	63	64	56	49	55	91	97	92
2002	905	98	103	58	95	83	77	34	58	74	61	76	88
2003	979	79	92	103	86	78	54	64	47	84	82	110	100
2004	814	61	64	81	68	82	53	38	50	67	74	84	92
2005	1,582	110	112	133	146	164	123	108	78	138	126	199	145
2006	2,055	199	175	194	199	202	116	124	98	133	193	183	239
2007	2,638	284	199	276	247	268	167	128	100	230	236	267	236
2008	4,354	385	313	326	427	397	251	223	246	349	397	453	587
2009	5,053	504	509	556	560	493	299	269	317	258	418	411	459
2010	4,791	440	274	449	482	440	294	268	329	344	432	505	534
2011	6,725	465	691	543	642	712	479	290	272	359	732	807	733
2012	8,176	869	634	748	819	798	623	407	433	533	854	796	662
2013	8,258	903	691	737	800	784	555	508	372	606	694	930	678
2014	9,690	1,099	910	961	1,004	763	620	621	295	641	857	1,075	844
2015	9,781	950	867	948	982	903	504	446	593	671	906	1,103	908
2016	9,934	845	912	870	1,100	670	647	510	423	802	920	958	1,277
2017	11,136	953	1,125	1,137	1,021	937	738	501	424	792	1,163	1,154	1,191
2018	10,712	1,155	987	1,067	957	755	884	596	610	885	945	936	935
2019	10,965	1,013	837	1,063	883	961	704	623	566	980	1,258	1,102	975
2020	11,832	910	1,175	1,168	1,028	903	973	659	871	938	958	1,132	1,117
2021	12,942	1,016	947	1,302	1,253	1,071	890	708	860	1,020	1,080	1,346	1,449
2022	14,275	1,439	1,349	1,399	1,393	1,140	953	805	772	933	1,227	1,451	1,414
2023	4,014	1,205	1,473	1,336									

== See also ==
- Solar power in Minnesota
- Wind power in the United States
- Renewable energy in the United States
