= List of mammals of Minnesota =

This list of mammals of Minnesota includes the mammals native to Minnesota. It also shows their status in the wild. There are 81 native and 5 introduced mammal species found in the state. American bison, caribou, and wolverines were extirpated from the state. Minnesota does not have a state mammal but several have been proposed: The northern white tailed deer was proposed eight times, the eastern wolf was proposed six times, the American black bear and thirteen-lined ground squirrel were each proposed once.

The following tags are used to highlight each species' conservation status as assessed by the International Union for Conservation of Nature; those on the left are used here, those in the second column in some other articles:

EX	EX	Extinct	No reasonable doubt that the last individual has died.
EW	EW	Extinct in the wild	Known only to survive in captivity or as a naturalized population well outside its historic range.
CR	CR	Critically endangered	The species is in imminent danger of extinction in the wild.
EN	EN	Endangered	The species is facing a very high risk of extinction in the wild.
VU	VU	Vulnerable	The species is facing a high risk of extinction in the wild.
NT	NT	Near threatened	The species does not qualify as being at high risk of extinction but is likely to do so in the future.
LC	LC	Least concern	The species is not currently at risk of extinction in the wild.
DD	DD	Data deficient	There is inadequate information to assess the risk of extinction for this species.
NE	NE	Not evaluated	The conservation status of the species has not been studied.

== Didelphimorphs ==
=== Opossums ===
- Virginia opossum, Didelphis virginiana LC

== Rodents ==
=== Squirrels ===
- Northern flying squirrel, Glaucomys sabrinus LC
- Southern flying squirrel, Glaucomys volans LC
- Woodchuck, Marmota monax LC
- Least chipmunk, Neotamias minimus LC
- Eastern gray squirrel, Sciurus carolinensis LC
- Fox squirrel, Sciurus niger LC
- Franklin's ground squirrel, Poliocitellus franklinii LC
- Richardson's ground squirrel, Urocitellus richardsonii LC
- Thirteen-lined ground squirrel, Ictidomys tridecemlineatus LC
- Eastern chipmunk, Tamias striatus LC
- American red squirrel, Tamiasciurus hudsonicus LC
- Black-tailed prairie dog, Cynomys ludovicianus LC introduced

=== Beavers ===
- American beaver, Castor canadensis LC

=== Gophers ===
- Plains pocket gopher, Geomys bursarius LC
- Northern pocket gopher, Thomomys talpoides LC

=== Pocket mice ===
- Plains pocket mouse, Perognathus flavescens LC

=== Cricetids ===
- Eastern deer mouse, Peromyscus maniculatus LC
- White-footed mouse, Peromyscus leucopus LC
- Western deer mouse, Peromyscus sonoriensis NE
- Western harvest mouse, Reithrodontomys megalotis LC
- Northern grasshopper mouse, Onychomys leucogaster LC
- Northern bog lemming, Synaptomys borealis LC
- Southern bog lemming, Synaptomys cooperi LC
- Rock vole, Microtus chrotorrhinus LC
- Prairie vole, Microtus ochrogaster LC
- Woodland vole, Microtus pinetorum LC
- Meadow vole, Microtus pennsylvanicus LC
- Eastern heather vole, Phenacomys ungava LC
- Southern red-backed vole, Myodes gapperi LC
- Muskrat, Ondatra zibethicus LC

=== Murids ===
- House mouse, Mus musculus LC introduced
- Brown rat, Rattus norvegicus LC introduced

=== Jumping mice ===
- Meadow jumping mouse, Zapus hudsonius LC
- Woodland jumping mouse, Napaeozapus insignis LC

=== Porcupines ===
- North American porcupine, Erethizon dorsatum LC

== Lagomorphs ==
=== Hares ===
- Snowshoe hare, Lepus americanus LC
- White-tailed jackrabbit, Lepus townsendii LC

=== Cottontail rabbits ===
- Eastern cottontail, Sylvilagus floridanus LC

== Eulipotyphlans ==
=== Shrews ===
- Northern short-tailed shrew, Blarina brevicauda LC
- North American least shrew, Cryptotis parva LC
- Arctic shrew, Sorex arcticus LC
- Masked shrew, Sorex cinereus LC
- American pygmy shrew, Sorex hoyi LC
- American water shrew, Sorex palustris LC

=== Moles ===
- Star-nosed mole, Condylura cristata LC
- Eastern mole, Scalopus aquaticus LC

== Bats ==
=== Evening bats ===
- Big brown bat, Eptesicus fuscus LC
- Silver-haired bat, Lasionycteris noctivagans LC
- Hoary bat, Lasiurus cinereus LC
- Eastern red bat, Lasiurus borealis LC
- Little brown bat, Myotis lucifugus EN
- Northern long-eared myotis, Myotis septentrionalis NT
- Eastern pipistrelle, Pipistrellus subflavus VU

== Carnivorans ==
=== Procyonids ===
- Common raccoon, Procyon lotor LC

=== Mustelids ===
- Wolverine, Gulo gulo LC vagrant
- Northern river otter, Lontra canadensis LC
- American marten, Martes americana LC
- Least weasel, Mustela nivalis LC
- American ermine, Mustela richardsonii NE
  - Western Great Lakes stoat, M. r. bangsi NE
- Long-tailed weasel, Neogale frenata LC
- Stoat, Mustela erminea LC
- American mink, Neogale vison LC
- Fisher, Pekania pennanti LC
- American badger, Taxidea taxus LC

=== Skunks ===
- Striped skunk, Mephitis mephitis LC
- Eastern spotted skunk, Spilogale putorius VU possibly extirpated

=== Canines ===
- Coyote, Canis latrans LC
- Gray wolf, Canis lupus LC
- Eastern wolf, Canis lycaon VU
- Minnesota wolf, C. lupus nubilus × C. lycaon NE
- Gray fox, Urocyon cinereoargenteus LC
- Swift fox, Vulpes velox LC vagrant
- Red fox, Vulpes vulpes LC
  - American red fox, V. v. fulva LC
  - Northern plains fox, V. v. regalis LC

=== Felines ===
- Canada lynx, Lynx canadensis LC
- Bobcat, Lynx rufus LC
- Cougar, Puma concolor LC vagrant

=== Bears ===
- American black bear, Ursus americanus LC
- Brown bear, Ursus arctos LC extirpated

== Artiodactyls ==
=== Deer ===
- Moose, Alces alces LC
- Elk, Cervus canadensis LC
- White-tailed deer, Odocoileus virginianus LC
  - Northern white-tailed deer, O. v. borealis LC
  - Dakota white-tailed deer, O. v. dacotensis LC
  - Kansas white-tailed deer, O. v. macrourus LC
- Caribou, Rangifer tarandus VU extirpated
  - Woodland caribou, R. t. caribou extirpated
- Mule deer, Odocoileus hemionus LC

=== Pronghorn ===
- Pronghorn, Antilocapra americana LC extirpated, now vagrant

=== Bovids ===
- American bison, Bison bison NT extirpated
  - Plains bison, B. b. bison extirpated

=== Pigs ===
- Wild boar, Sus scrofa LC introduced, extirpated
