= Solar power in Minnesota =

Overview of solar power in the U.S. state of Minnesota

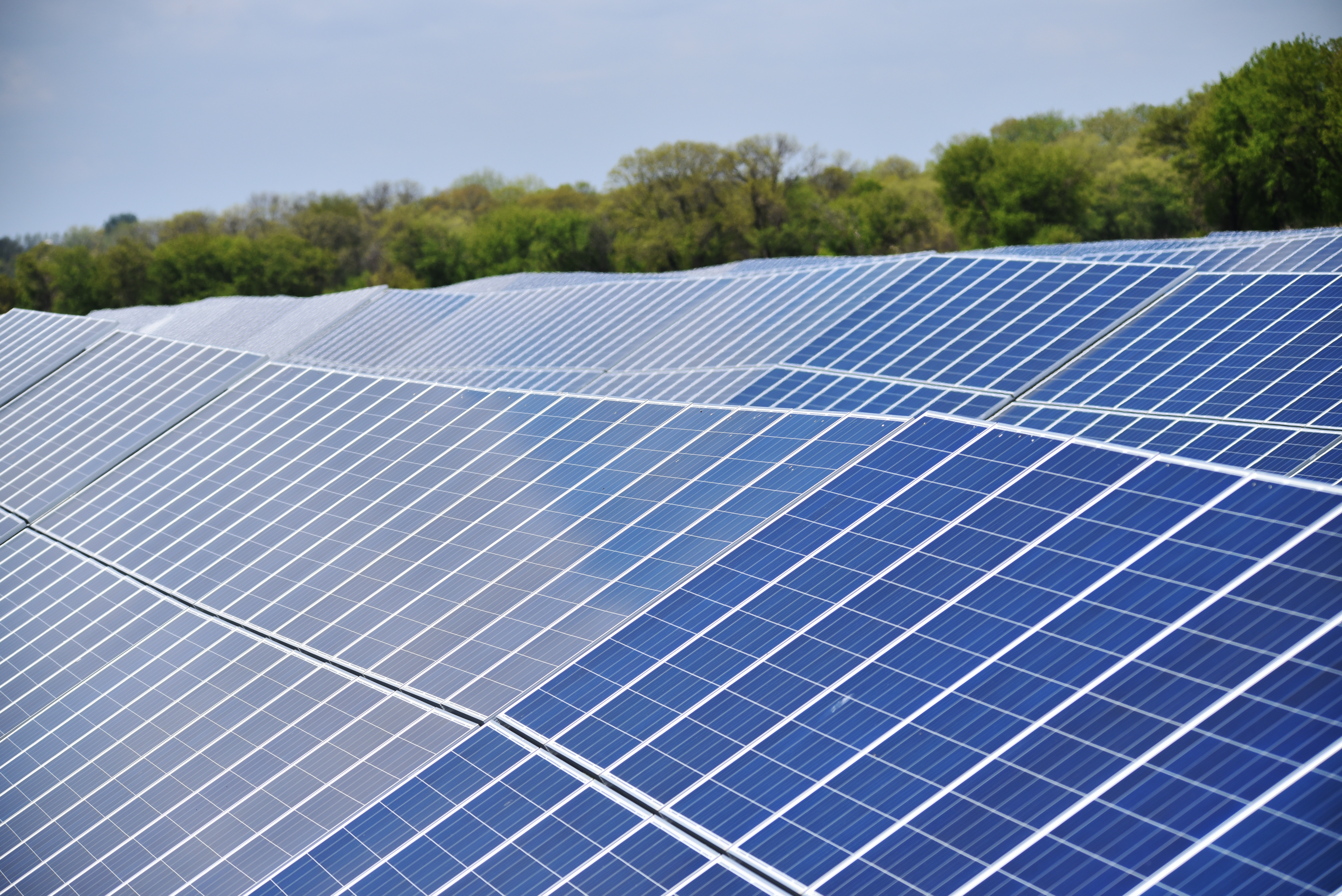
Solar installation, 2020

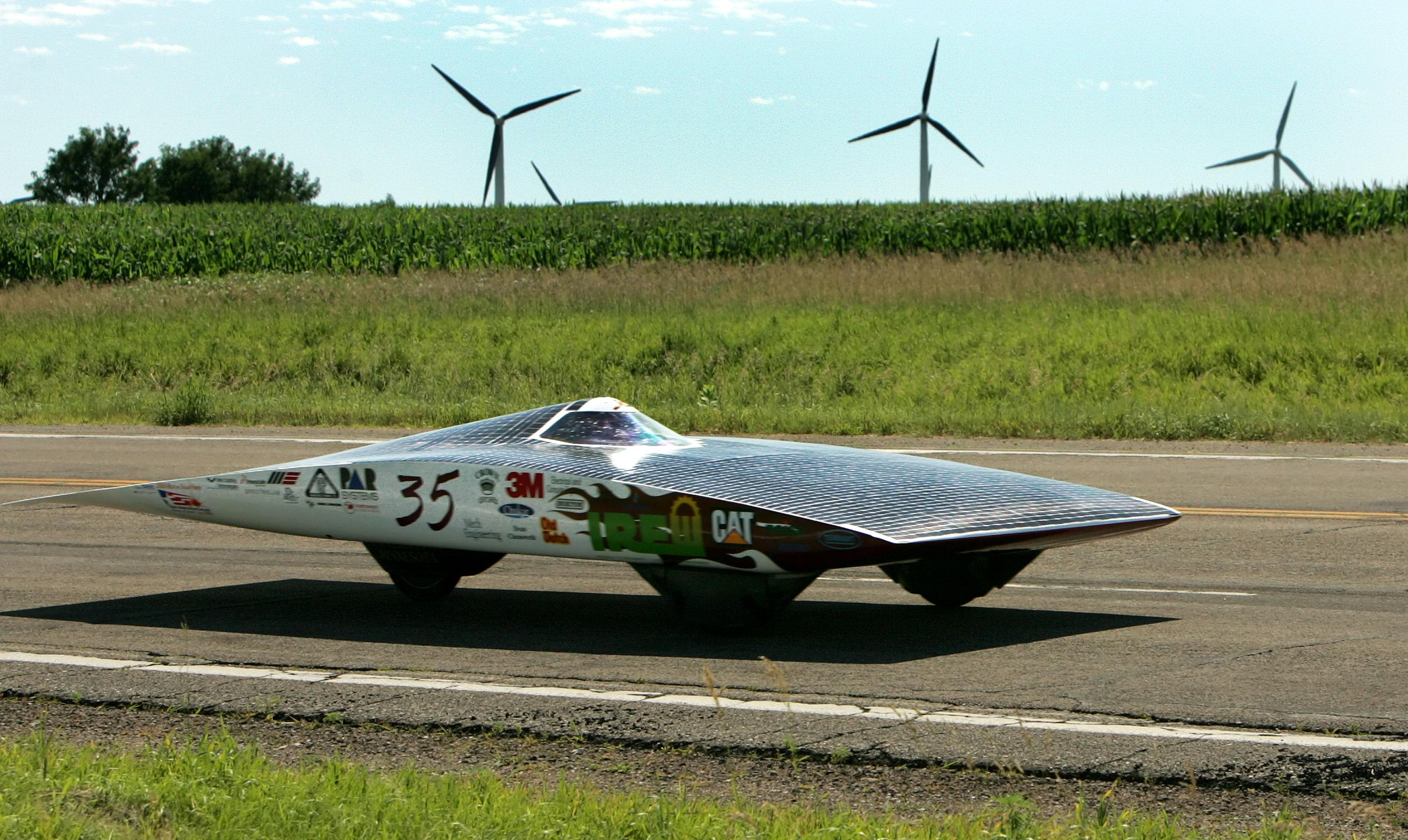
University of Minnesota solar car

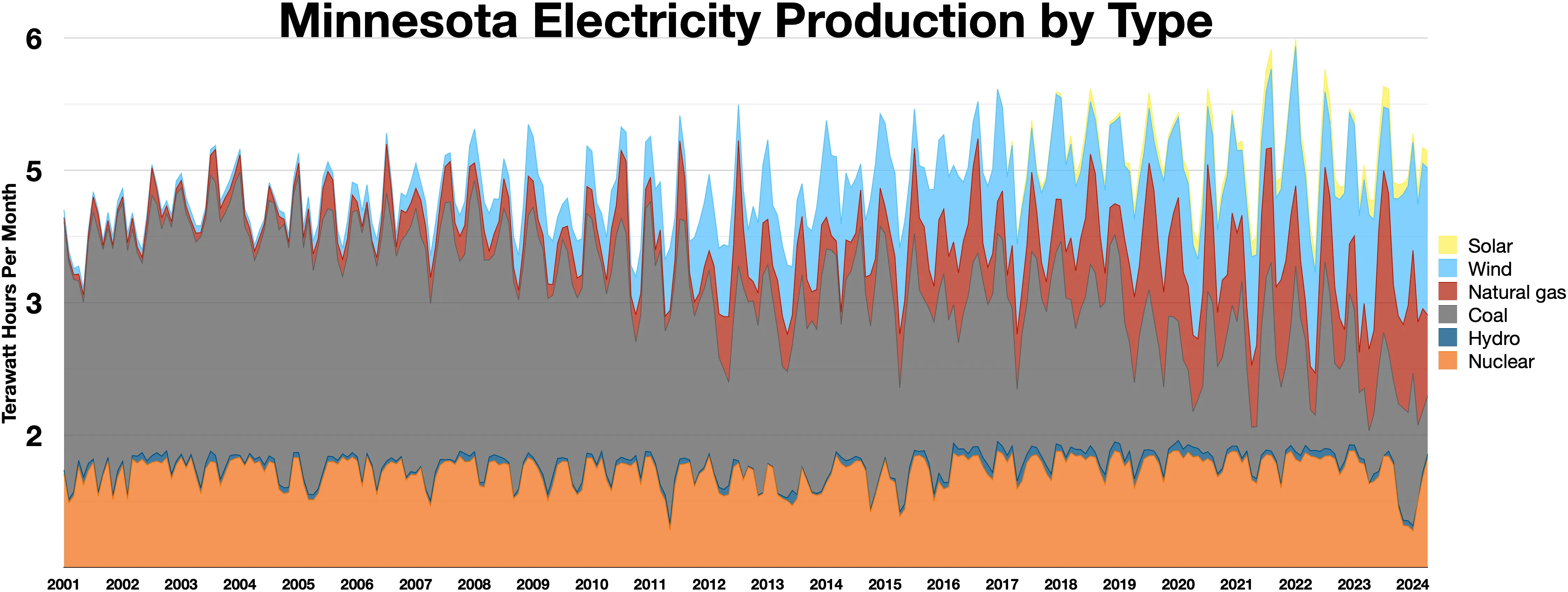
Minnesota electricity production by type

Solar power in Minnesota expanded significantly in the early 2010s as a result of the cost decrease of photovoltaics and favorable policies. By 2016, it began to grow quickly.

In 1983, Minnesota adopted a net metering rule which allows customers generating up to 40 kW to use net metering, with the kilowatt-hour surplus rolled over each month, or optionally credited at the retail rate.

In May 2013, the Minnesota legislature adopted a mandate on investor-owned utilities in the state that required them to produce 1.5% of their electricity from solar power by 2020, with the bill also raising the state's cap on net metering from 40 kW to 1 MW. This mandate was in addition to the state's renewable portfolio standard of 25% by 2025, and it was estimated that affected utilities would have to add 450 MW of solar by 2020 to comply with the 1.5% requirement.

While Minnesota is developing several utility level projects, currently the state's largest solar array is the North Star Solar Project in North Branch. With more than 440,000 solar panels, its output is more than 100MW. Other large arrays include the 62MW Marshall Solar Energy Project, completed in January 2017, a 2MW solar array in Slayton, and a 1 MW array at an IKEA in Bloomington. There is also a 600 kW array on the roof of the Minneapolis Convention Center,. In January 2015, Ecolab announced it would be going 100% solar powered by purchasing power from community solar gardens to be built by SunEdison. Ecolab's share of the power would be 16MW, more than the amount of solar power in the state at the time of the announcement. If completely subscribed, the solar gardens could provide up to 200MW. The Aurora Solar Project is a similar distributed network of arrays planned to reach 100MW utilizing midsized 2MW-10MW installations throughout the southern half of the state. The 62MW Marshall Solar Energy Project is proposed to be built on 500 acres near Marshall. Already home to the state's largest array, Chisago County has seven additional arrays in various stages of completion, earning it the nickname the "solar capital of Minnesota". When finished they will generate roughly 29 MW.

Minnesota has the potential to generate 38.5% of its electricity from rooftop solar, from 23,100 MW of solar panels. St. Paul can generate 27% of its electricity, using 800 MW, and Minneapolis 26% from 1,000 MW.

As of 2021, the average installation cost for solar panels is $3.07 per watt. Minnesota gets about four peak sun hours per day, so a 5 kW system can be expected to produce 7,300 kWh of energy per year and cost an average of $15,350.

== Statistics ==
Source: Perez-SUNY/NREL, 2012

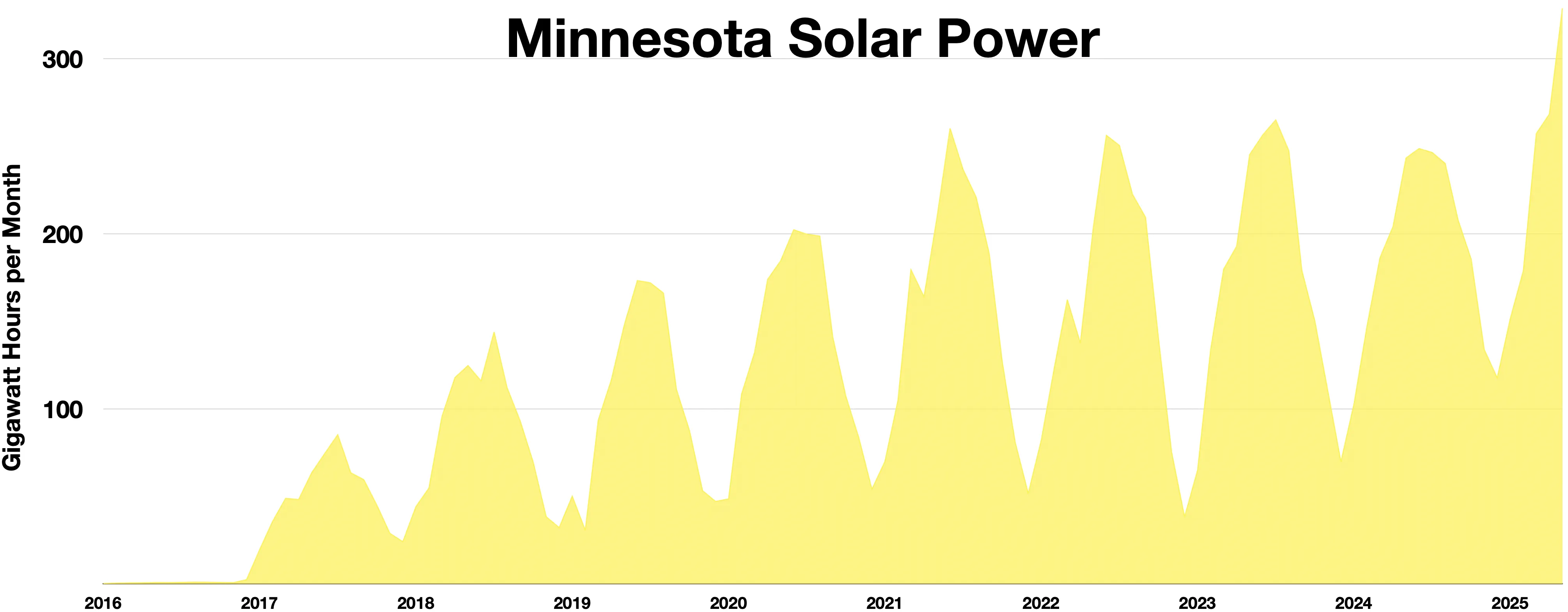
Minnesota solar power

Minnesota grid-connected PV capacity (MW)
Year	Capacity	Installed	% change
2007	0.9	0.3	52%
2008	1.2	0.3	40%
2009	2.1	0.9	75%
2010	4.5	2.3	109%
2011	6.4	1.9	43%
2012	12	5.7	88%
2013	17	5.1	42%
2014	23	6.2	37%
2015	37	14	59%
2016	246	209	562%
2017	714	468	190%
2018	1,118	404	56%
2019	1,364	246	22%
2020	1,568.6	204.6	15%
2021	1,677.7	109.1	%
2022	1,763	85.3	%

Utility-scale solar generation in Minnesota (GWh)
Year	Total	Jan	Feb	Mar	Apr	May	Jun	Jul	Aug	Sep	Oct	Nov	Dec
2016	11	0	0	1	1	1	1	1	1	1	1	1	2
2017	595	19	36	49	48	63	74	85	63	60	45	29	24
2018	1,043	44	55	96	118	125	116	144	112	93	70	38	32
2019	1,248	50	31	94	116	148	173	172	166	111	87	53	47
2020	1,758	81	110	132	165	190	191	207	188	151	138	113	92
2021	1,972	99	112	169	188	217	217	209	212	181	146	126	96
2022		113											

== See also ==
- List of power stations in Minnesota § Solar
- Wind power in Minnesota
- Solar power in the United States
- Renewable energy in the United States
