= List of reptiles of Minnesota =

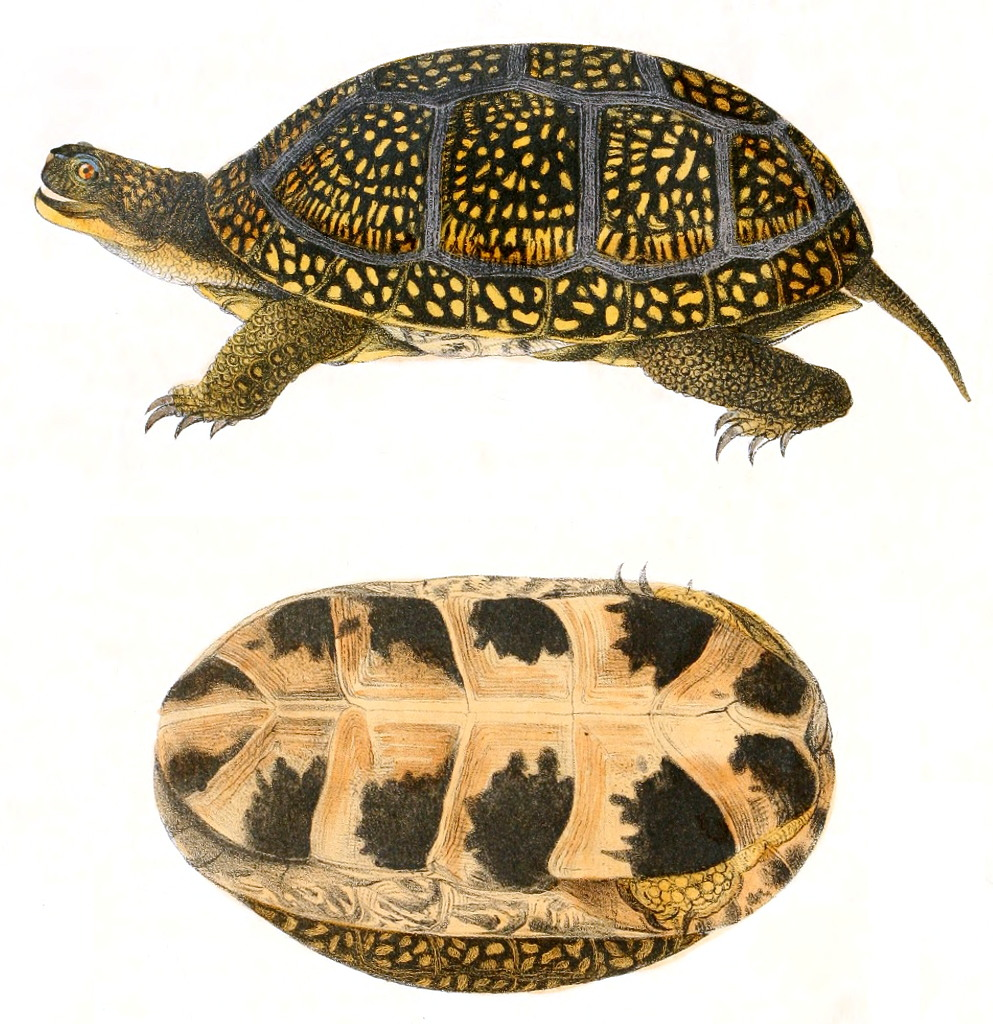
Blanding's turtle (scientific name Emys blandingii or Emydoidea blandingii) was the proposed state reptile of Minnesota.

Thirty species of reptiles have been recorded in the US state of Minnesota, including 16 species of snakes, eleven species of turtle, and three species of lizard. Of those 31 species, two (Blanding's turtle and the wood turtle) have been listed as endangered by the International Union for Conservation of Nature, with another 20 listed as least concern and nine have not been evaluated.

Minnesota does not have an official state reptile. However, the Blanding's turtle was proposed as the reptile of the state in 1998 and 1999.

== Snakes ==
| Common name | Scientific name | Conservation status | Description | Photograph |
|---|---|---|---|---|
| Eastern yellowbelly racer | Coluber constrictor flaviventris | Not evaluated | Nonvenomous; adults reach 30–50 inches (76–127 cm); color varies from olive to blue to nearly black | |
| Ringneck snake | Diadophis punctatus | Least concern | Nonvenomous; adults reach 8–15 inches (20–38 cm); has a distinct yellow ring around the neck; color varies from slate gray to olive | |
| Western rat snake | Pantherophis obsoletus | Not evaluated | Nonvenomous; adults reach 42–72 inches (110–180 cm); adults appear shiny black; underbellies are white with black mottles | |
| Western fox snake | Pantherophis ramspotti | Least concern | Nonvenomous; adults reach 36–54 inches (91–137 cm); color varies from tan to greenish brown with large black blotches | |
| Western hognose snake | Heterodon nasicus | Least concern | Nonvenomous; adults reach 16–26 inches (41–66 cm); color varies from light yellow or olive color with systematic brown blotches | |
| Eastern hognose snake | Heterodon platyrhinos | Least concern | Nonvenomous; adults reach 20–33 inches (51–84 cm); color varies from gray to brown with dark brown markings | |
| Eastern milk snake | Lamptopeltis triangulum triangulum | Not evaluated | Nonvenomous; adults reach 24–36 inches (61–91 cm); repeating red, black-outlined blotches | |
| Smooth green snake | Opheodrys vernalis (sometimes Liochlorophis vernalis) | Not evaluated | Nonvenomous; adults reach 14–20 inches (36–51 cm); color varies from a uniform bright green to brownish green | |
| Northern water snake | Nerodia sipedon | Least concern | Nonvenomous; adults reach 24–42 inches (61–107 cm); color varies from gray to reddish brown with dark brown crossbands | |
| Bullsnake | Pituophis catenifer sayi | Not evaluated | Nonvenomous; adults reach 37–72 inches (94–183 cm); color varies from tan to brown with large brown or black spots | |
| DeKay's brown snake | Storeria dekayi | Least concern | Nonvenomous; adults reach 6–13 inches (15–33 cm); color varies from brown to reddish brown; two rows of dark spots across the back | |
| Northern redbelly snake | Storeria occipitomaculata | Least concern | Nonvenomous; adults reach 8–10 inches (20–25 cm); color varies from gray-brown to reddish-brown | |
| Plains garter snake | Thamnophis radix | Least concern | Nonvenomous; adults reach 15–28 inches (38–71 cm); similar to other garter snakes but with a yellow stripe down the side | |
| Eastern garter snake | Thamnophis sirtalis | Least concern | Nonvenomous; adults reach 18–26 inches (46–66 cm); color varies from black to olive; usually has three yellowish stripes, one down the back and one along each side | |
| Lined snake | Tropidoclonion lineatum | Least concern | Nonvenomous; adults reach 8–15 inches (20–38 cm); colors range from gray to black with a lighter color stripe down the middle of the back | |
| Timber rattlesnake | Crotalus horridus | Least concern | Venomous; adults reach 36–60 inches (91–152 cm); color varies from yellow to tan with dark markings on the back | |

== Turtles ==
| Common name | Scientific name | Conservation status | Description | Photograph |
|---|---|---|---|---|
| Blanding's turtle | Emydoidea blandingii | Endangered | Length of 6–9 inches (15–23 cm); yellow, long, narrow throat; domed carapace | |
| Common snapping turtle | Chelydra serpentina | Least concern | Length of 8–14 inches (20–36 cm); weight of 10–35 pounds (4.5–15.9 kg); shell color varies from tan to black | |
| Common musk turtle | Sternotherus odoratus | Least concern introduced | | |
| Smooth softshell turtle | Apalone mutica | Least concern | | |
| Red-eared slider | Trachemys scripta elegans | Least concern Introduced | | |
| False map turtle | Graptemys pseudogeographica | Least concern | Length of 3–10 inches (7.6–25.4 cm); upper shell has yellow connected circles or lines; lower shell is greenish-yellow | |
| Northern map turtle | Graptemys geographica | Least concern | Length of 6–10.75 inches (15.2–27.3 cm); fine yellow lines on a brown to olive shell | |
| Ouachita map turtle | Graptemys ouachitensis | Least concern | Length of 6–10 inches (15–25 cm); ridge down the center of the shell; bright yellow lines on the head and limbs | |
| Painted turtle | Chrysemys picta bellii | Least concern | Length of 4–10 inches (10–25 cm); carapace color varies from tan to olive, with markings on the neck | |
| Spiny softshell turtle | Apalone spinifera spinifera | Not evaluated | Female length of 7–19 inches (18–48 cm); male length of 5–9.25 inches (12.7–23.5 cm); olive to brown, flexible, smooth shell | |
| Wood turtle | Glyptemys insculpta (formerly Clemmys insculpta) | Endangered | Length of 5.5–8 inches (14–20 cm); rough, tan to gray carapace | |

== Lizards ==
| Common name | Scientific name | Status | Description^{[a]} | Photograph |
|---|---|---|---|---|
| Five-lined skink | Plestiodon fasciatus | Least concern | Total length of 5–8.5 inches (13–22 cm); maximum body length of 3.4 inches (8.6 cm); brown to black body with short legs; juveniles have a blueish tail that turns to grey with maturation | |
| Prairie skink | Plestiodon septentrionalis | Least concern | Maximum body length of 8.8 inches (22 cm); juveniles are blue, adults are tan with black stripes | |
| Six-lined racerunner | Aspidoscelis sexlineatus | Least concern | Total length of 6–10.5 inches (15–27 cm); maximum body length of 3.4 inches (8.6 cm); light yellow to white stripes alternating with black stripes down back | |

== Notes ==
- ^{a} Total length refers to the total length of the lizard. Maximum body length is the measurement from snout to cloaca of the lizard.
