= Water-shield =

Water-shield may refer to the following aquatic plants:

- Brasenia schreberi (water-shield)
- Cabomba caroliniana (fanwort; Carolina water-shield)
