= List of Minnesota state symbols =

Minnesota's northerly location in the United States has resulted in its official designation as L'Étoile du Nord ("Star of the North").

There are twenty-two official symbols of the US state of Minnesota, as designated by the Minnesota Legislature. The first named symbol is the state's motto, L'Étoile du Nord – French for "Star of the North". It was selected in 1861, shortly after Minnesota achieved statehood, by the first governor, Henry Sibley, as a reflection of Minnesota's location in the Northern United States. That same year, the original state seal was adopted. Minnesota did not designate another official symbol until 1945, when "Hail! Minnesota", then the official song of the University of Minnesota, was designated as state song. In 1984, Minnesota became the first state to appoint a state mushroom, the common morel (Morchella esculenta). The newest symbols of Minnesota are the giant beaver and Little Dipper, both adopted on July 1, 2025.

Minnesota schoolchildren have been the force behind the successful promotion of four official symbols: the blueberry muffin (1988), the monarch butterfly (2000), the Honeycrisp apple (2006), and ice hockey (2009). The 1918 black-and-white photograph Grace, taken by Eric Enstrom in Bovey and later reproduced as a color painting by his daughter, was named state photograph in 2002.

Many other symbols have been proposed as representations of the state, but for various reasons have been unsuccessful. Suggested animals have included the white-tailed deer, the northern leopard frog, the eastern timber wolf, the thirteen-lined ground squirrel, and the Blanding's turtle. Through the years, the state legislature has also voted on unsuccessful bills to designate the Tilt-A-Whirl as official amusement ride, the works Little House on the Prairie and On the Banks of Plum Creek as state book, and "Minnesota Blue" as official poem.

== State symbols ==
Type	Symbol	Description	Adopted	Image
Bee	Rusty patched bumblebee (Bombus affinis)	Once widespread across the United States, the rusty patched bumblebee has lost up to 90% of its range since the 2000s. Sightings in the 2010s were primarily reported around several upper Midwest urban areas; a third of these were in Minneapolis and Saint Paul.	2019	A closeup of a yellow and black bee against a black backdrop
Beverage	Milk	Minnesota annually produces 9.7 million pounds (4.4 million kilograms) of milk, and among all states is ranked fifth in overall dairy production. Milk was adopted as the state beverage due to its promotional value for the American Dairy Association; its ability to encourage tourism and increase awareness for dairy products; and as a signal to the state's dairy industry that Minnesota cares for it.	1984	A clear glass of white milk on a brown wood table against a dark backdrop
Bird	Common loon (Gavia immer)	An estimated 12,000 common loons reside in Minnesota. A common loon is depicted on the state seal. Originally, eight bird choices were proposed in the late 1940s, which in addition to the common loon included the eastern goldfinch, the mourning dove, the pileated woodpecker, the scarlet tanager, and the wood duck. Each of these were eligible because they were not the state birds of another state. A decision was delayed due to citizen indecision, but a letter-writing campaign over a decade after the original proposal led to the selection of the loon.	1961	The common loon, Minnesota's state bird.
Butterfly	Monarch (Danaus plexippus)	The monarch migrates to Minnesota during midsummer, where approximately four generations are born each year. It was promoted as state butterfly by several students of Oscar Henry Anderson Elementary School from Mahtomedi. The bill's co-sponsor, State Representative Harry Mares, said that "a lot of people have an early introduction to the magical world of nature through the monarch, and as we get older it becomes a thread that takes us through science to beauty and aesthetics."	2000	The monarch butterfly, Minnesota's state butterfly
Constellation	Ursa Minor	Polaris, the North Star from which Minnesota's nickname "the North Star State" is derived, lies at the tip of Ursa Minor, the Little Dipper.	2025	Ursa Minor
Fire museum	Bill and Bonnie Daniels Firefighter Hall and Museum	The museum is located in Minneapolis.	2023	The two-story brick museum
Fish	Walleye (Stizostedion vitreum)	The Star Tribune writes that the walleye is Minnesota's most popular fish, and it serves as "the mainstay of sport fishing" in the state. The walleye lives in every watery part of Minnesota, but prefers the cooler lakes of the northern part of the state. It was first proposed as the state fish in 1953.	1965	The walleye, Minnesota's state fish
Flag	Flag of Minnesota	The Minnesota flag has a dark blue field on the hoist in the shape of Minnesota, representing the night sky; a white eight-pointed star representing the North Star over this field; and a light blue field on the fly, representing the significance of water to the state. The flag's current design was adopted on Statehood Day, May 11, 2024.	2024	The Flag of Minnesota
Flower	Pink-and-white lady's slipper (Cypripedium reginae)	The pink-and-white lady's slipper is found in swamps, bogs, and damp woods. It has largely disappeared due to habitat loss; as one of Minnesota's rarest wildflowers, the lady's slipper is illegal to pick in the state.	1967	The pink-and-white lady's slipper, Minnesota's state flower.
Fossil	Giant beaver (Castoroides ohioensis)	The giant beaver lived in the area that is now Minnesota 12,000–10,000 years before present. The designation of a state fossil was championed by the Science Museum of Minnesota and paleontologist Alex Hastings.	2025	A giant beaver fossil on display at the Science Museum of Minnesota
Fruit	Honeycrisp apple (Malus pumila)	The Honeycrisp apple was designed by University of Minnesota researchers to endure Minnesota's harsh winter climate. It was proposed as the state fruit by Andersen Elementary School students from Bayport.	2006	The Honeycrisp apple, Minnesota's state fruit
Gemstone	Lake Superior agate	Found in the northeastern and north central parts of Minnesota, the Lake Superior agate consists of quartz blended with the red and orange effects that come from soil rich in iron ore.	1969	The Lake Superior agate, Minnesota's state gemstone
Grain	Wild rice (Zizania palustris)	Wild rice grows in central and northern Minnesota lakes, and for a long time was produced nowhere else. As of 2013, Minnesota produces 80 percent of all natural wild rice. The Ojibwe people hold it sacred, believing it was given to them by their Creator.	1977	Greenish-purple wild rice waves in the breeze against a white sky.
Motto	L'Étoile du Nord	L'Étoile du Nord is French for "Star of the North". It was chosen by Henry Sibley, the state's first governor, shortly after the Minnesota territory became a state in 1858. Sibley selected it as a reflection of Minnesota's location so far north in the US.	1861	L'Étoile du Nord, Minnesota's official motto, as it appears on the former state seal
Muffin	Blueberry muffin	Northeastern Minnesota is home to wild blueberries, where they grow in bogs and forests. The blueberry muffin was proposed as a state food by South Terrace Elementary students from Carlton, who were learning about the state legislature and its laws in their civics class.	1988	The blueberry muffin, one of Minnesota's state foods
Mushroom	Common morel (Morchella esculenta)	In the spring, morel mushrooms can be found in Minnesota fields and forests. They primarily grow in the southwest, northern, and middle parts of the state, and are popular with gourmet cooks.	1984	A red bin full of harvested morels, several-inch-high light-colored mushrooms with white stems and membranous caps
Photograph	Grace	Grace depicts a man sitting "at a table bowed in thankful prayer before a modest meal." The original 1918 black-and-white photograph was taken by Eric Enstrom in Bovey. Enstrom's daughter later reproduced it as a color painting, leading to its wide distribution in homes and churches throughout the US.	2002	Grace, a black and white photo of a bearded man bowed in prayer
Seal	Great Seal of the State of Minnesota	Minnesota's official seal depicts several other state symbols: the common loon, Norway Pine, wild rice, and the North Star as a representation of the state motto. It is ringed by 98 gold bars. It also features waves to represent the significance of water to the state, and contains the phrase Mni Sóta Makoce in Dakota, the origin of the word Minnesota.	2024	The Minnesota State Seal, Minnesota's official seal
Soil	Lester	Named after the town of Lester Prairie, Lester is a nutrient-rich soil ideal for the growing of pasture grasses and crops such as soybeans and corn. It is present in approximately sixteen Minnesota counties and covers over 400,000 acres (160,000 ha). Lester was chosen by the Minnesota Association of Professional Soil Scientists for fitting four criteria: it is based in Minnesota, is extensively located and economically important, and is photogenic. Minnesota is the 22nd state to have an official soil.	2012	Lester, Minnesota's state soil
Song	"Hail! Minnesota"	Between 1904 and 1905, Minnesota's state song was written by two University of Minnesota students; it served as the school's official song until 1945, when it was adopted as state song. The "Minnesota Rouser" eventually replaced it as the university's official song.	1945	The sheet music to "Hail! Minnesota", the state's official song
Sport	Ice hockey	Minnetonka Middle School East students first proposed ice hockey as the state sport in 2007. One of the children explained their choice, "One of the best reasons hockey should be our state sport is because Minnesota is the land of 10,000 lakes and they all freeze up to make great hockey rinks." The bill was co-sponsored by State Senator David Tomassoni, a former hockey player.	2009	A purple-clad Minnesota Frost player shoots a puck towards three white-clad Boston Fleet players protecting the goal. Three other Minnesota players rush towards the puck.
Tree	Norway pine (Pinus resinosa)	The Norway pine, also known as the red pine, has historically been vital to Minnesota's economy, especially during its early settlement. It can grow between 60 and 100 feet (18 and 30 m) tall. The tallest Minnesota specimen, which is over 300 years old, is found in Itasca State Park.	1953	The Norway pine, Minnesota's state tree

== Nicknames and unsuccessful proposals ==
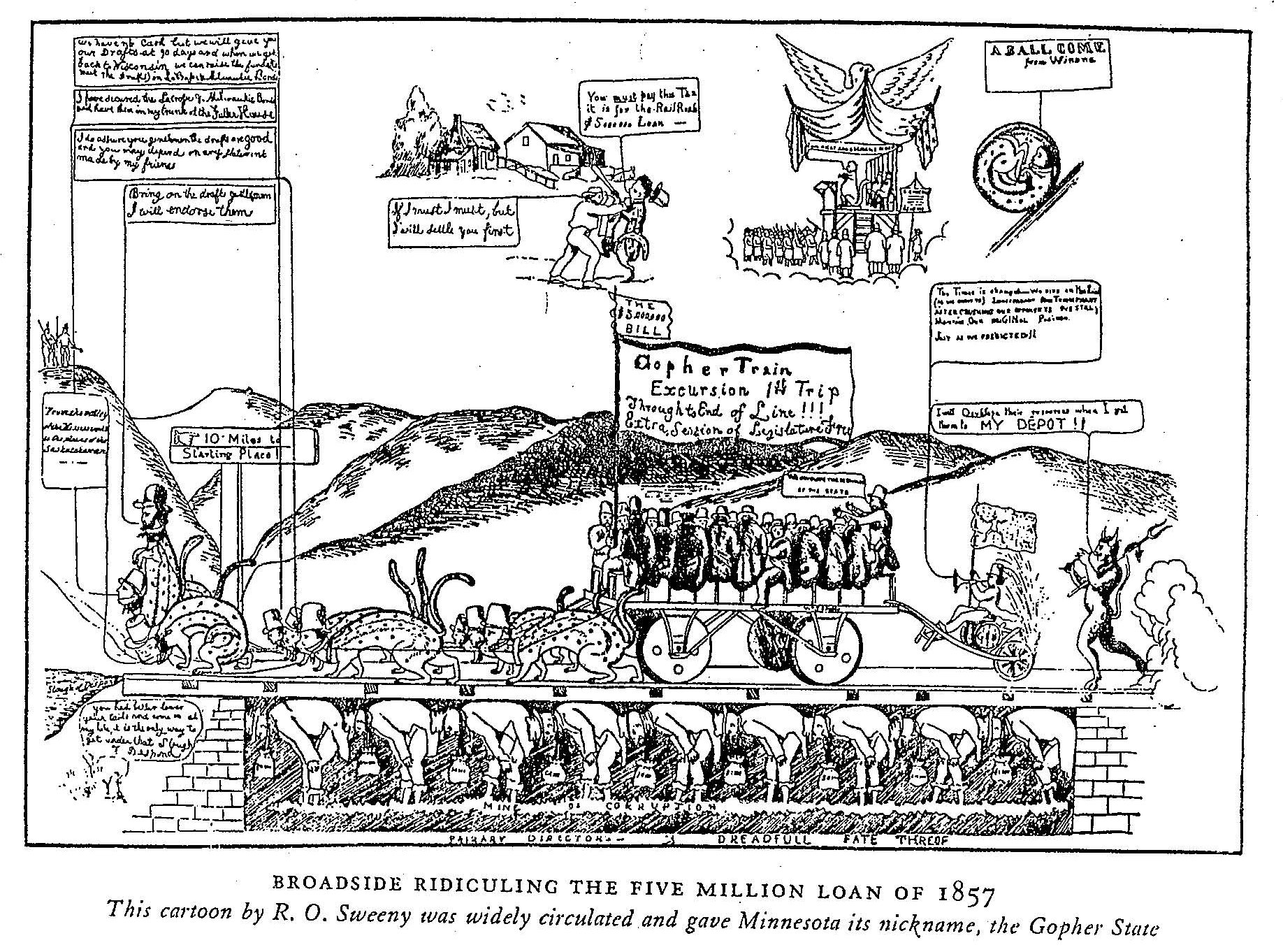
The 1857 anti-railroad political cartoon that gave Minnesota the nickname "Gopher State"

Minnesota has three nicknames: "Land of 10,000 Lakes", which evolved from the desire of early settlers to advertise the state's large number of lakes to attract more people; "Gopher State", which was inspired by an early political cartoon criticizing the construction of several railroads in the mid-1800s; and "North Star State", a reference to both the state motto and Minnesota's position as the northernmost point in the contiguous United States. The Minnesota North Stars, the state's hockey team from 1967 to 1993, also derived its name from the state motto.

Many other symbols have been proposed for addition to the list of official state symbols but were never officially adopted. Since 1971, the white-tailed deer has been proposed as the state mammal eight times. Other creatures proposed as representations of the state have included the northern leopard frog, the eastern timber wolf, the thirteen-lined ground squirrel, and the Blanding's turtle. In 2007, another proposal, also unsuccessful, was to designate the Tilt-A-Whirl as the state's official amusement ride. It was invented in Faribault in 1926, and debuted at the Minnesota State Fair a year later.

In 2005, the state legislature overwhelmingly voted in favor of appointing a state poet laureate, a position offered by 34 other states. Governor Tim Pawlenty vetoed the measure, believing that the state could "benefit from the richness and diversity of all of the poets in Minnesota and recognize and embrace their work as merit and circumstances warrant." "Minnesota Blue", a 1985 poem by state native and poet-songwriter Cordell Keith Haugen, has been unsuccessfully proposed as state poem. Five other states have official poems. Proposals for state book have included two of Laura Ingalls Wilder's works, Little House on the Prairie and On the Banks of Plum Creek.

In 2016, Minnesota proposed to make purple its official color in honor of the musician Prince; however, the motion did not succeed.

== See also ==
- History of Minnesota
- Index of Minnesota-related articles
- Outline of Minnesota
