= Flag of Minnesota =

U.S. state flag

State of Minnesota
- Use: Small vexillological symbol or pictogram in black and white showing the different uses of the flag Reverse side is mirror image of obverse side
- Proportion: 3:5
- Adopted: May 11, 2024; 2 years ago
- Design: A light blue field with a dark blue obtuse angular figure on the hoist bearing a white eight-pointed star
- Designed by: Andrew Prekker (base design); Brian Cham, Tyler & Jenae Michaletz, Ted Kaye, Luis Fitch (refinement)

The state flag of the U.S. state of Minnesota, adopted on May 11, 2024, features a dark blue field representing the night sky and the state's shape, an eight-pointed star symbolizing the North Star, and a light blue field representing the state's abundant waters; the shape of the star is based on the design featured on the rotunda floor the Minnesota State Capitol.

Minnesota's flag has undergone several redesigns since its first official adoption in 1893. Earlier versions incorporated the then state seal against a solid color background. Criticism over the flag's complexity and the seal's controversial depiction of Indigenous peoples prompted calls for change. In response, the Minnesota Legislature established the State Emblems Redesign Commission in 2023 to propose new designs.

The 2024 redesign followed public input and was part of a broader trend among U.S. states adopting simpler flags. The new flag has received both praise for its clarity and symbolism and criticism over its simplicity and perceived political motivations.

== Design and specifications ==
=== Statute ===
Construction sheet

Minnesota statute 1.141 states that "The design of the state flag as certified in the report of the State Emblems Redesign Commission... is adopted as the official state flag." The text of the law defers the details of the current flag's appearance and design to the Commission's report, which was dated January 1, 2024. The report of the State Emblems Redesign Commission described the design as the following:

On its left side, the flag contains a dark blue background with a white, 8 point star. One of the points of the star points north. The dark background is in the shape of the outline of the State of Minnesota. The remainder of the flag is a solid, bright blue.

The report also features imagery and a construction sheet, more precisely designating the flag's colors and appearance.

=== Geometry and colors ===
The flag has an aspect ratio of 3:5 (i.e. 5/3 ≈ 1.67). The shape of the flag's dark blue region represents the shape of the state of Minnesota itself. The flag's white star is a regular octagram, having the Schläfli symbol {8/3}; the floor of the rotunda in the Minnesota State Capitol has an identical octagram design. The State Emblems Redesign Commission's report also contains an official construction sheet for the flag.

The flag uses three colors: dark blue, light blue, and white. Respectively, they represent the night sky, the waters of Minnesota, and Polaris, the North Star. The State Emblems Redesign Commission's report provided technical specifications for the flag's colors, alternately in the distinct Web color, CMYK and Pantone systems:

| Name | RGB, or Web color | | | | | CMYK | | | | Pantone |
| Name | Web color | R | G | B | Hex code | C | M | Y | K | Pantone |
|---|---|---|---|---|---|---|---|---|---|---|
| White | | 255 | 255 | 255 | #FFFFFF | 0 | 0 | 0 | 0 | White |
| Night Sky Blue | | 0 | 45 | 93 | #002D5D | 100 | 86 | 35 | 31 | 648 |
| Water Blue | | 82 | 201 | 232 | #52C9E8 | 59 | 0 | 6 | 0 | 305 |

=== Display and use ===
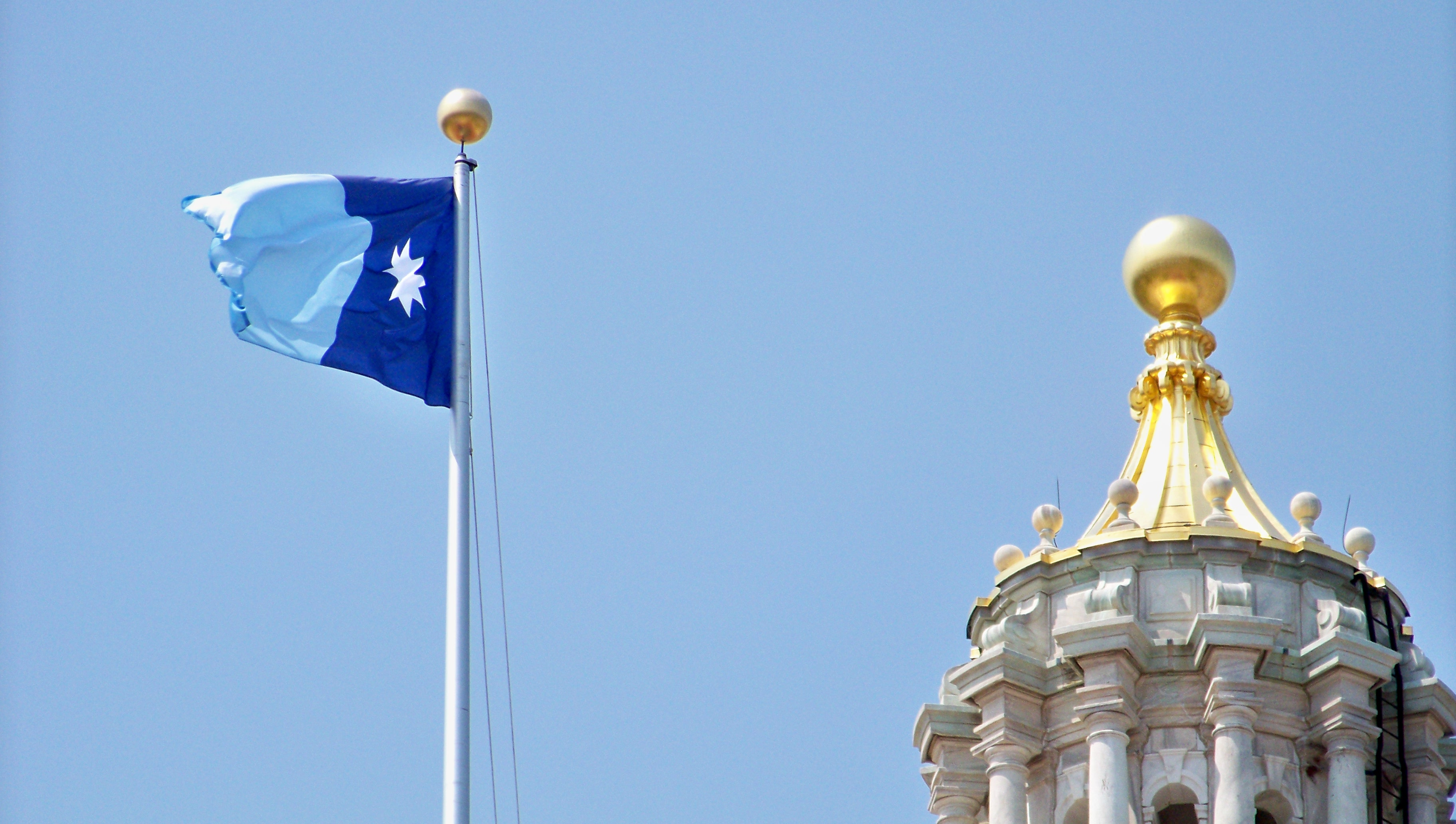
The 2024 Minnesota flag flying outside the State Capitol on Statehood Day

The flag is required to be flown over the Minnesota State Capitol from sunrise to sunset. When the flag is folded for storage, it should be folded in the same way as the national flag.

Mutilating, defiling, or casting contempt upon the flag, attaching any design to the flag, or using the flag for advertising were misdemeanor offenses under State Statute 609.40, excepting flags on written or printed documents. However, following the 1990 Supreme Court ruling United States v. Eichman, enforcement of this law has been deemed unconstitutional.

==== Folding history ====
The flag of Minnesota did not have an official folding technique until 2010, when instructions for folding the 1983 State Flag for storage and display were codified in law. The folding for storage technique was done in the same manner as the U.S. flag, but the display technique was developed by members of the Minnesota National Guard, and was so detailed that it was confusing to some. The original code (which was repealed in 2024 with the adoption of the new state flag) read:

Fold the flag four times lengthwise so that one section displays the three stars of the state crest and the text "L'Etoile du Nord." Fold each side behind the displayed section at a 90-degree angle so that the display section forms a triangle. Take the section ending with the hoist and fold it at a 90-degree angle across the bottom of the display section and then fold the hoist back over so it is aligned with the middle of the display section. Fold the other protruding section directly upwards so that its edge is flush with the display section and then fold it upwards along a 45-degree angle so that a mirror of the display section triangle is formed. Fold the mirror section in half from the point upwards, then fold the remaining portion upwards, tucking it between the display section and the remainder of the flag.

== History ==
=== 1893 flag ===
Flag of Minnesota, 1893–1957

Obverse

Reverse

L'Étoile du Nord is French for
"The Star of the North"

During the first 35 years of statehood, Minnesota did not have an official state flag. That changed with preparations for the 1893 Chicago World's Fair, where each state was invited to showcase its identity and achievements. In 1891, the Minnesota legislature voted to sponsor an exhibit at the fair, and then Governor William Rush Merriam appointed an all-male board to oversee the state's participation. Responsibility for organizing the display of "women's work", however, fell to the Women's Auxiliary Board, a group of female volunteers.

Recognizing the need for a visual symbol to represent Minnesota, the Auxiliary Board initiated the creation of the state's first official flag. A six-woman committee, led by Mrs. Franklyn L. Greenleaf, launched a public design contest in 1892 that drew more than 200 entries. In February 1893, they selected a design by Amelia Hyde Center, a Minneapolis artist and leatherworker. She received a $15 prize (equivalent to $537 in 2025) for her winning entry.

With support from the Auxiliary Board, the Minnesota legislature passed an act on April 4, 1893, officially adopting Center's design as the first state flag of Minnesota.

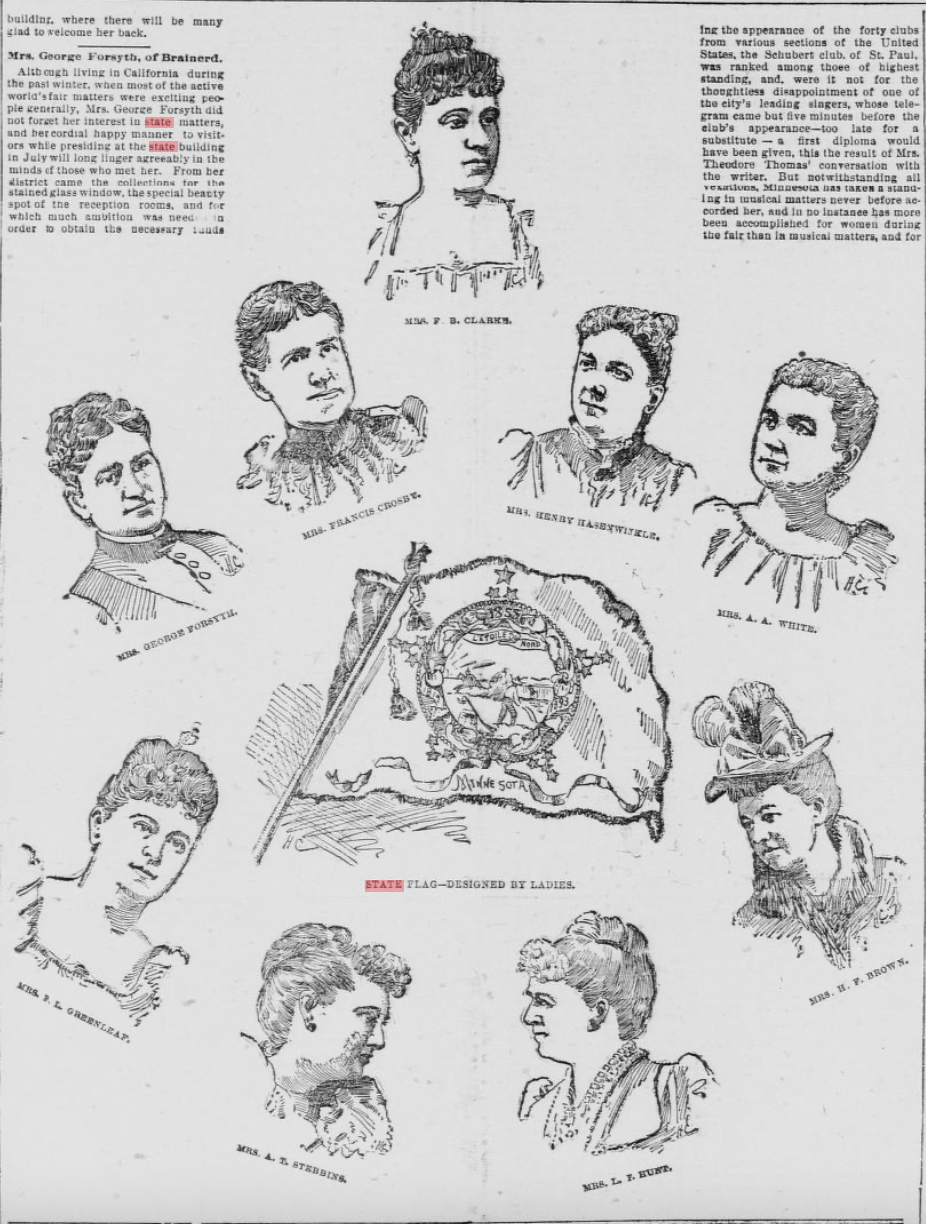
The women who designed the flag.

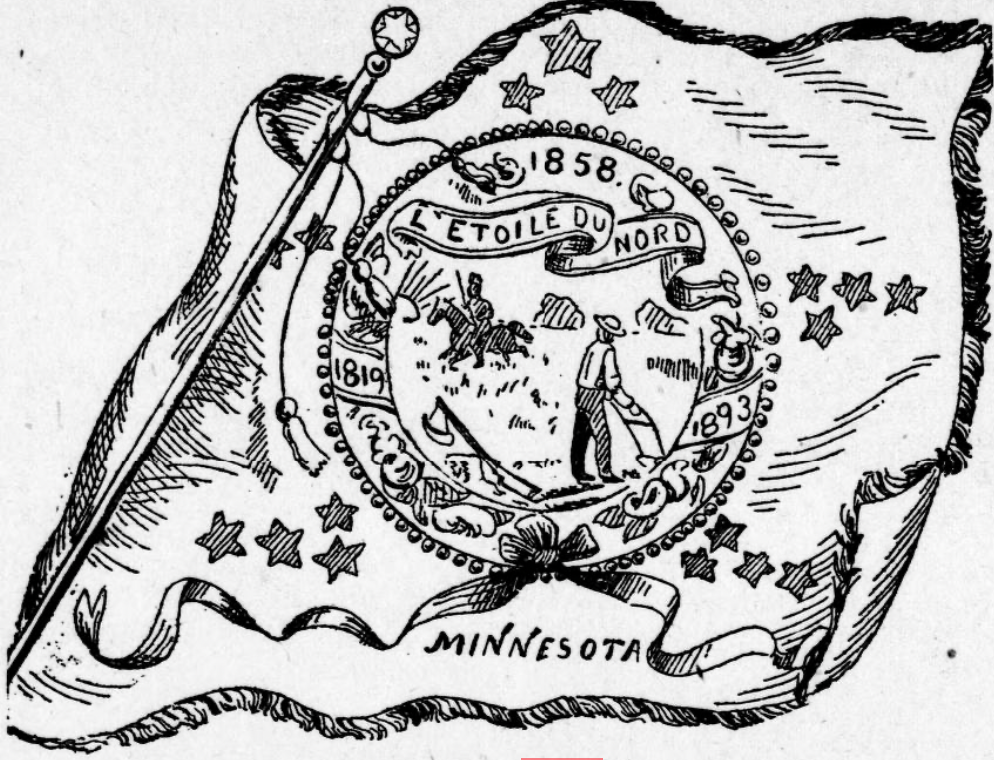
illustration of the state flag from 1893

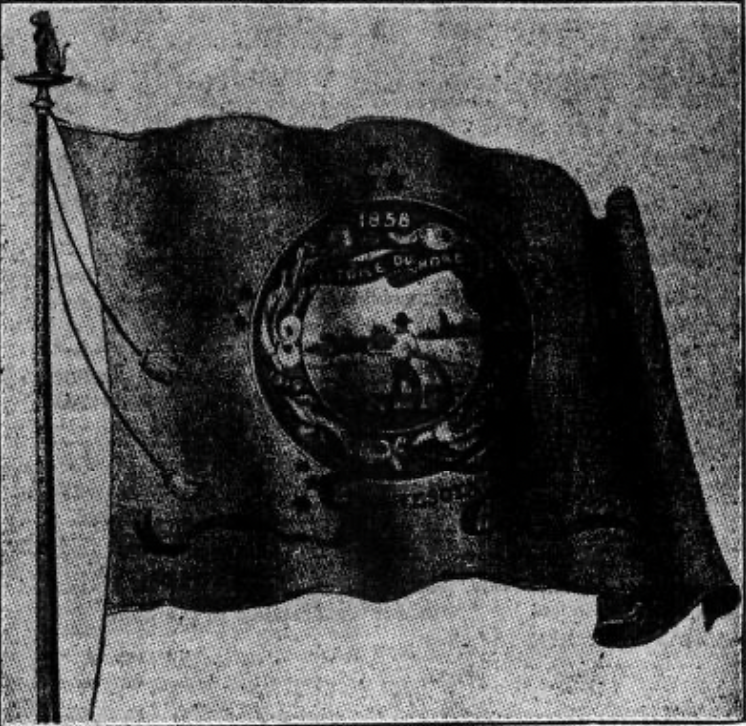
illustration of the state flag from 1909

The first physical version of the flag, made of silk, was embroidered by sisters Pauline and Thomane Fjelde. Their workmanship earned a gold medal at the fair where it was displayed.

Center's design was white on the obverse side and blue on the reverse. At the center of both sides was the state seal encircled by a white moccasin flowers (a flower indigenous to Minnesota) overlaying a blue disc. The seal depicted a scene including a farmer plowing while a Native American on horseback rides westward. A red ribbon across the seal bore the motto, L'Étoile du Nord (in French, "The Star of the North"). The years 1819 (Fort Snelling's founding), 1858 (statehood), and 1893 (flag adoption) appeared in gold around the seal. Below it, "Minnesota" was written in gold. Surrounding the seal were 19 gold stars arranged in clusters forming a five-pointed-star, symbolizing Minnesota as the 19th state admitted to the union after the original 13. In 1895, there was a variant of the state flag which had the state's coat of arms in gold.

Historians suggest the design drew inspiration from Minnesota infantry flags used during the Civil War, many of which consisted of a blue field with the state seal or an American eagle and a scroll. Similar banners were standard issue for all U.S. infantry regiments from 1890 to 1904.

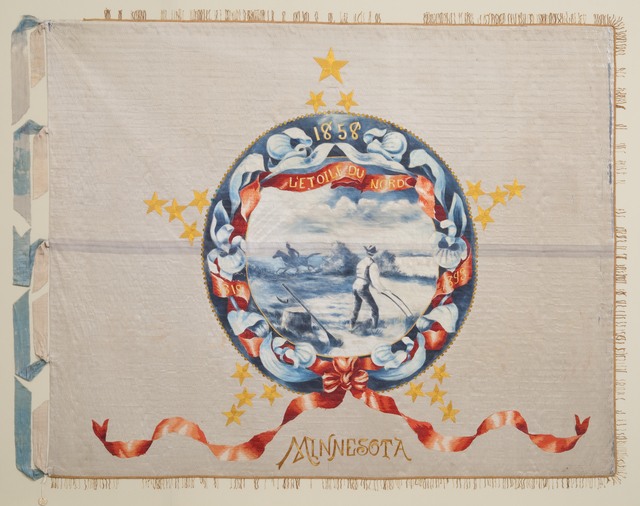
The 13th Minnesota Infantry Regimental flag from 1898.

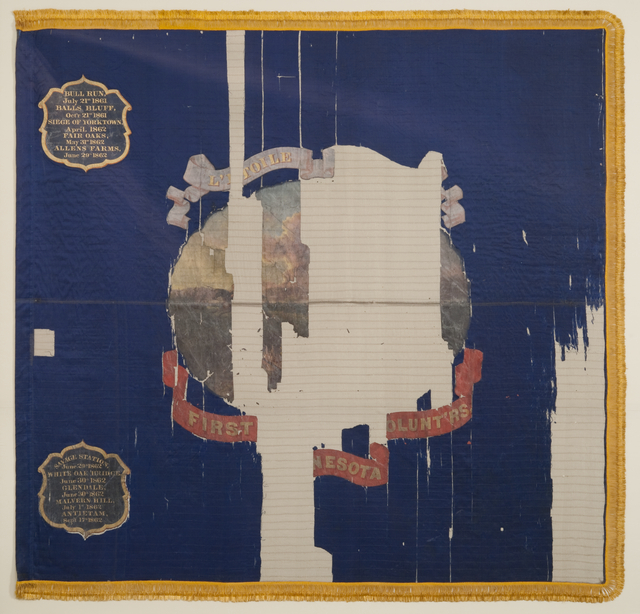
The 1st Minnesota Infantry Regimental flag.

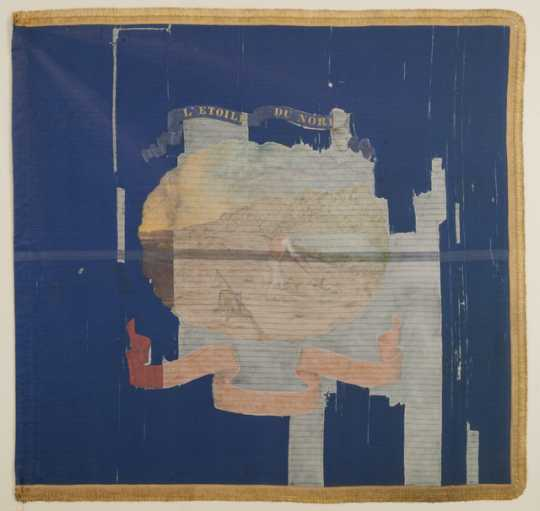
The 4th Minnesota Infantry Regimental flag.

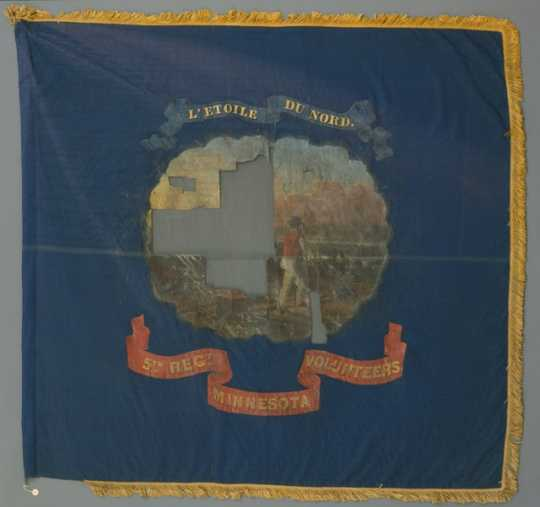
The 5th Minnesota Infantry Regimental flag.

=== 1957 flag ===
Flag of Minnesota, 1957–1983

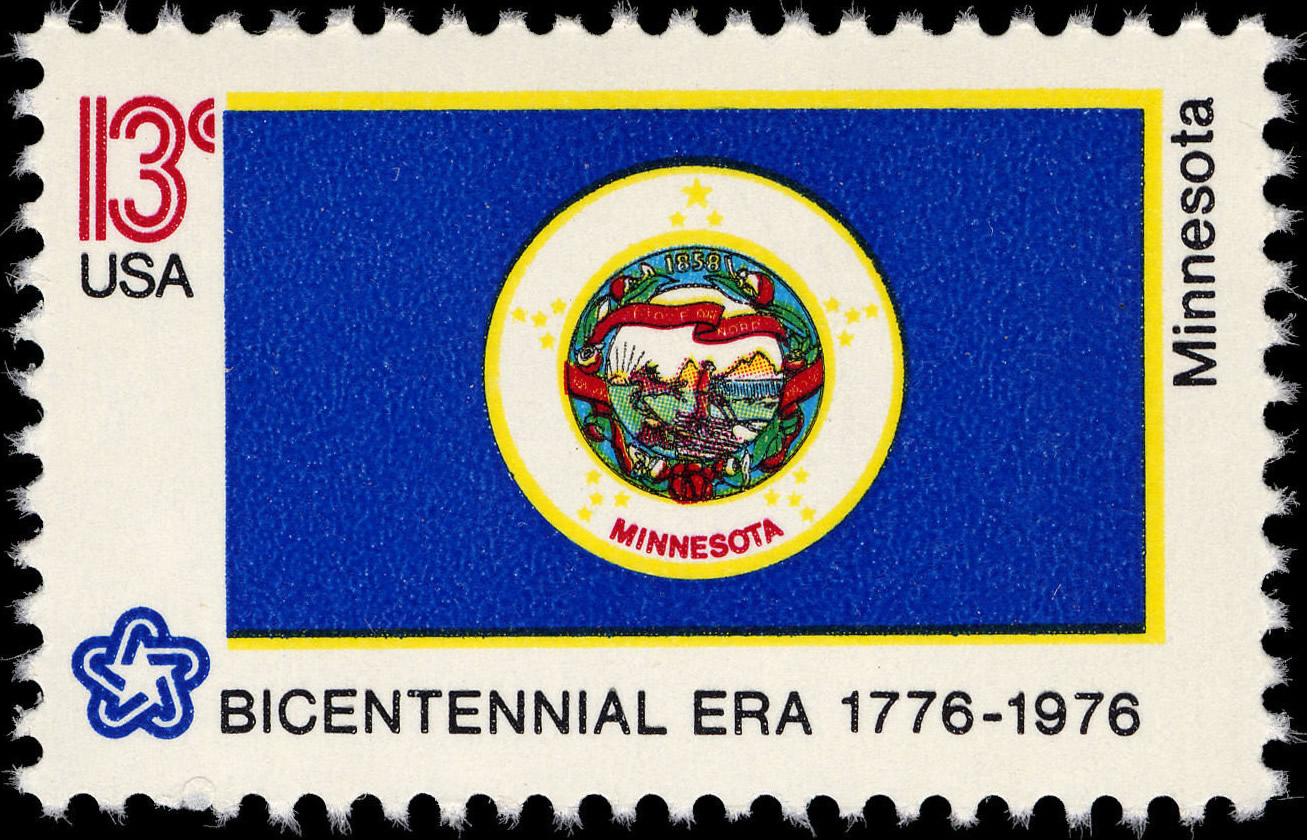
The Minnesota state flag (1957–1983) as depicted in the 1976 bicentennial postage stamp series.

The Minnesota state flag was redesigned in 1957 in anticipation of the state's centennial in 1958. As part of broader efforts to commemorate 100 years of statehood, the legislature saw an opportunity to modernize the flag's appearance and improve its practicality. The original flag's two-sided design with a white obverse and blue reverse was expensive to manufacture and prone to fraying in high winds. To address these concerns, the new version featured a uniform design and blue field on both sides, allowing for a single-layer, more durable construction that was also more cost-effective to produce.

The floral elements were also updated for botanical accuracy. The original depiction of moccasin flowers was replaced with pink-and-white lady's-slippers, the official state flower of Minnesota.

The redesign also simplified the central emblem, which featured three concentric circular fields. At the center was the Seal of Minnesota. Encircling it was a blue ring, adorned with a wreath of pink-and-white lady's-slippers and a red ribbon bearing the years 1819 and 1893 marking the founding of Fort Snelling and the adoption of Minnesota's original state flag. The year 1858, denoting Minnesota's admission to the union, appeared in gold at the top of the ring.

Surrounding this was a white outer ring displaying 19 gold stars arranged in five radial clusters. Four clusters each contained four stars, while the top-center cluster included two stars flanking a larger one, symbolizing the North Star. The number of stars represented Minnesota's position as the 19th state admitted to the Union after the original 13. Below the seal, between the two lower star clusters, the state's name appeared in red. Both the blue and white rings were bordered in gold.

=== 1983 flag ===
Flag of Minnesota, 1983–2024

In 1983, the flag underwent a redesign that included a redrawing of the seal and a lightening of the blue field from royal blue to a medium blue, though the exact shade varied among manufacturers. The flag maintained a rectangular shape with the emblem centered on a blue field. By statute, the flag was bordered with gold and finished with gold fringe, although the fringe was rarely seen on outdoor flags, being mostly reserved for indoor versions.

Several updates were made to the seal's imagery. The Indigenous figure was repositioned to face more toward the farmer, emphasizing a changed perspective. The Mississippi River and St. Anthony Falls were added, highlighting their historical importance in transportation, industry, and settlement. Behind the falls, three pine trees were included to represent the state tree (the Norway pine) and the three pine regions of the state: the St. Croix, Mississippi, and Lake Superior. The seal continued to feature three significant years in Minnesota history—1819, 1858, and 1893—along with the pink-and-white lady's slipper and 19 stars arranged as in the 1957 flag.

==== Responses to the 1983 flag ====
Criticism of the 1983 design steadily grew over the following decades, fueling calls for change. Detractors argued that the flag was overly complex, difficult to distinguish at a distance, and too similar to other state flags featuring blue fields with state seals. Additionally, some critics, including Lieutenant Governor Peggy Flanagan, objected to the imagery of the state seal—viewing it as a representation of Manifest Destiny. These concerns, combined with growing public interest in redesigning state flags, eventually led the Minnesota Legislature to establish a redesign commission in 2023.

== Notable proposals ==
=== Anderson–Nelson proposal ===
Anderson–Nelson Proposal (1957)

In 1957, a proposed alternative to Minnesota's state flag was introduced by Representative John Tracy Anderson in collaboration with Major General Joseph E. Nelson, then Adjutant General of the Minnesota National Guard and a heraldry enthusiast. The design featured 19 stars arranged to form a larger star, set within a vertical triband of red, white, and blue. Anderson promoted the flag as a stronger alternative to the plain blue flag with the state seal, which had been proposed by a legislative commission that year. Although the proposal gained some attention, it was ultimately rejected by the Minnesota House of Representatives in a 48–23 vote. Nelson supported retaining the original 1893 flag until a more distinctive and symbolic design could be adopted.

=== The North Star Flag ===
The "North Star Flag", an influential unofficial design proposed in 1989.

The North Star Flag was created in 1988 by Lee Herold and Reverend William Becker as a proposed alternative to Minnesota's state flag. Like previous designs of the state flag, it features a yellow star symbolizing the state motto L'Étoile du Nord ("The Star of the North"). The design also includes the colors of blue, white, and green representing water, winter, and forests, respectively.

Although never officially adopted, the design gained significant grassroots support. It was presented to the state legislature in 1989 with backing from Republican representative Gil Gutknecht and later won an unofficial design contest in 2001 judged by vexillologists. The flag was sold by Herold's Rochester-based flag store and appeared at public events and in media coverage, making it one of the most recognizable unofficial symbols of Minnesota.

Herold continued to advocate for the design in the decades that followed. In 2023, he gave a flag design testimony before the State Emblems Redesign Commission, but the North Star Flag was not selected as a finalist in the redesign process.

While the final 2024 design does not directly derive from it, the North Star Flag played a notable role in public discourse around flag redesign, helping to sustain interest in replacing the previous state flag.

=== Marcel Stratton's proposal ===
Marcel Stratton's Proposal (2001)

In 2001, the then Minnesota-based Utne Reader magazine held a public competition inviting people to design potential new flags for U.S. states and Canadian provinces. One of the winning entries was a proposed flag for Minnesota, designed by Marcel Stratton. It consisted of three horizontal curved stripes representing a waving flag; Blue for the sky, white for the winter landscape and green for the summer landscape. A white five-pointed North Star was placed within the middle of the blue stripe. No flags from this contest were ever officially adopted.

== 2023 redesign commission ==
=== Formation ===
In April 2021, a student from Wayzata High School contacted State Senator Ann Johnson Stewart to discuss creating a bill to change the state flag. Senator Johnson Stewart agreed and worked with her colleague Senator Mary Kunesh to author the bills HF284 and SF847 to introduce to the 92nd Legislature. The bills outlined the State Emblems Redesign Commission that later went into effect after the bill's passage several years later. The bills did not advance during the 92nd Legislative session.

On March 22, 2022, two Democratic-Farmer-Labor members of the Minnesota House of Representatives, Mike Freiberg and Peter Fischer, introduced a bill to redesign the state's flag and seal. Fischer began supporting a flag redesign in 2017 after a group of high school students raised the issue to him. The law outlines specific guidelines for the redesign, stipulating that the new designs "must accurately and respectfully reflect Minnesota's shared history, resources, and diverse cultural communities" and that symbols representing only a single community or person are prohibited. It was proposed as part of a state budget bill and was opposed by Republican representatives, who viewed it as a low priority.

In May 2023, as a part of the annual state budget, the Minnesota Legislature established the State Emblems Redesign Commission, tasked with proposing new designs for Minnesota's flag and seal. The legislation dictates that, barring any contrary legislation, the chosen flag design will be adopted as the state flag on May 11, 2024. The committee has 13 members, including representatives of the Indian Affairs Council, the Council for Minnesotans of African Heritage, the Minnesota Council on Latino Affairs, and the Council on Asian-Pacific Minnesotans, along with three members of the general public appointed by Governor Tim Walz. The committee held its first meeting on September 5.

=== Submission phase ===
In October 2023, the committee opened the floor to public submissions for new flag designs. They received 2,123 flag proposals and 398 seal designs. Common motifs included the state bird (the loon), alongside depictions of lakes, rivers, and the North Star. More diverse entries ranged from photographs of dogs and wooden floors to national flags, psychedelic monkey illustrations, and a loon shooting lasers from its eyes, reminiscent of the "Laser Kiwi" flag proposed in New Zealand's 2015–2016 flag referendums. Several submissions were unchanged images of the 1983 flag.

==== Selection of finalists ====
On November 21, 2023, the commission convened at the Minnesota Senate Building to review the submissions. Although initially intending to select five finalists, six designs were chosen. All featured a star motif and the colors blue and white, while none included the loon, as the committee felt it symbolized only part of Minnesota. By December 13, the finalists were narrowed to three designs: F1953, F2100, and F944.

Finalists selected by the commission

F1953 – Designed by Andrew Prekker, selected as the basis of the final design on December 15

F2100 – Designed by John Muller, eliminated on December 15

F944 – The "Mirror of the Sky Flag", designed by Todd and Peter Pitman, eliminated on December 15

F29 – "Starflake", designed by Brandon Hundt, eliminated on December 13

F1154 – Designed by Ross Bruggink, eliminated on December 13

F1435 – Designed by Sarah Agaton Howes, eliminated on December 13

=== Final design ===
On December 15, 2023, the committee selected design F1953 as the final flag, eliminating proposals F2100 and F944. The winning design was created by 24-year-old Andrew Prekker of Luverne, who had no formal background in design. Even before the commission was announced, Prekker had brainstormed ideas for a new flag and shared an early version in the Facebook group "Minnesotans for a Better Flag" just one week before the commission's creation, later producing more than 50 variations after feeling it was "fate" to pursue the project.

He was motivated by concerns that the old flag's complex seal and blue background made it indistinguishable from many others, and he believed its imagery was not a unifying symbol for all Minnesotans, particularly Indigenous communities and tribal nations. Determined to create a unique and inclusive design, Prekker conducted extensive research into Minnesota history and culture, studied vexillology, consulted online flag enthusiasts, polled public opinion, and sought feedback from friends and family. He said he was inspired by the simplicity and memorability of flags such as those of Arizona, Texas, New Mexico, and Colorado, while drawing his main inspiration from Minnesota itself.

The star, included in every draft, was influenced by the state motto, and the stripes symbolized white for snow, green for nature and agriculture, and light blue for water, reflecting Minnesota's identity as the land of 10,000 lakes and the origin of the Mississippi River. Prekker described the redesign as an important and necessary change to create a symbol all Minnesotans could proudly display, calling his involvement "a privilege and an honor," and said that while winning would be a rare and meaningful distinction, simply participating in the process had already been deeply rewarding.

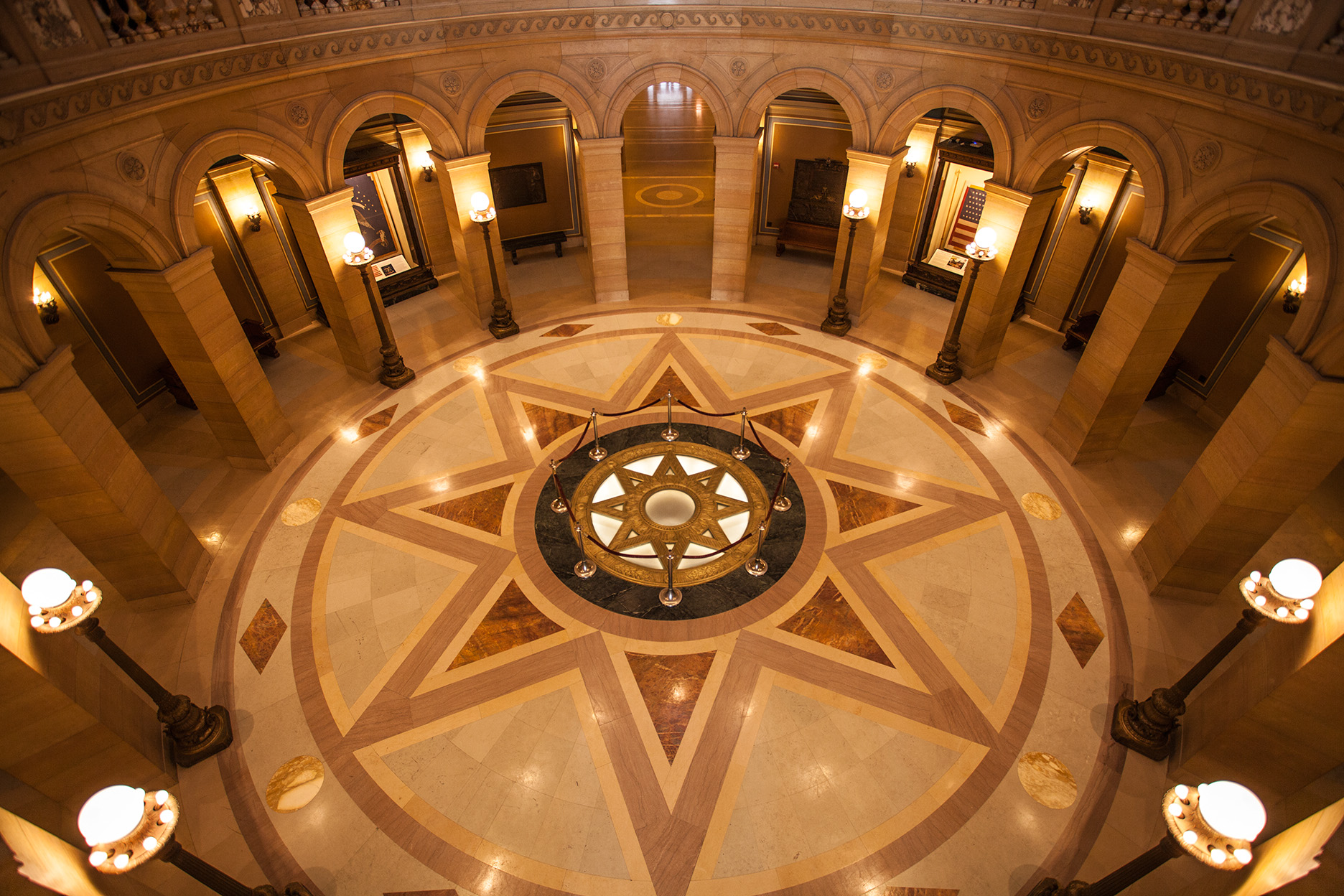
The final designs incorporated a modified eight-pointed star inspired by the one found in the Minnesota State Capitol rotunda.

By December 19, after graphic designers Tyler and Jenae Michaletz presented several variations of the finalist designs, the commission narrowed the choices to five variations of F1953 for the final vote. NAVA members Ted Kaye and Brian Cham actively collaborated with the Michaletz designers throughout the refinement process, contributing to the form of the final design.

A2 (final design)

B2

C2

D2

E2

On December 19, 2023, the commission officially selected design A2 by an 11-to-1 vote, with B2 receiving the sole dissenting vote. Ahead of the vote, Commission Chair Luis Fitch said he saw the Mississippi River represented in the flag's light blue field, noting it as the most important river in the U.S. and emphasizing the significance of its origin in Minnesota.

The new flag officially became Minnesota's state flag on May 11, 2024, coinciding with the state's annual Statehood Day celebrations.

==== Response to the 2024 flag ====
Public reaction to the final design of the 2024 Minnesota state flag was mixed, with many praising its simplicity and symbolism, while others criticized the change. Flag expert Ted Kaye of the North American Vexillological Association described the design as "outstanding", placing it among the top ten U.S. state flags.

Democratic leaders praised the inclusive design process and the removal of controversial imagery from the previous flag. Lieutenant Governor Peggy Flanagan, who had previously declined to display the old flag due to its depiction of Indigenous people, called the new version an "upgrade" that better represents all Minnesotans.

Conservative critics argued that the new flag resembled the flag of Somalia or the flag of Puntland. State officials responded that any resemblance was coincidental and noted the specific meaning of the star and colors in the Minnesota context. A local news poll found that only 23% of Minnesota voters supported adopting the new flag, while 21% preferred replacing it with a different design and 49% wanted to keep the existing flag. Secretary of State Steve Simon pointed out that several U.S. state flags resemble foreign flags, such as Iowa and France, or Texas and Chile.

Several rural Greater Minnesotan counties, including Crow Wing, Houston, McLeod, Nobles, Becker, Mower, and Brown, passed resolutions opposing either the new flag, or the process by which it was chosen. In early 2024, Republican legislators introduced bills seeking to place the new flag on a statewide ballot, but these efforts stalled and did not advance during the legislative session.

In 2026, several communities voted to stop flying the flag. The Elk River city council voted unanimously to fly the 1983 flag instead of the redesign.

The flag was a popular fixture at the 2026 U.S. immigration enforcement protests, with the owner of a Rochester flag store saying that sales of the flag had gone up by 75 percent since the beginning of Operation Metro Surge. A MinnPost article described the flag as "a unifying symbol during the ICE occupation".

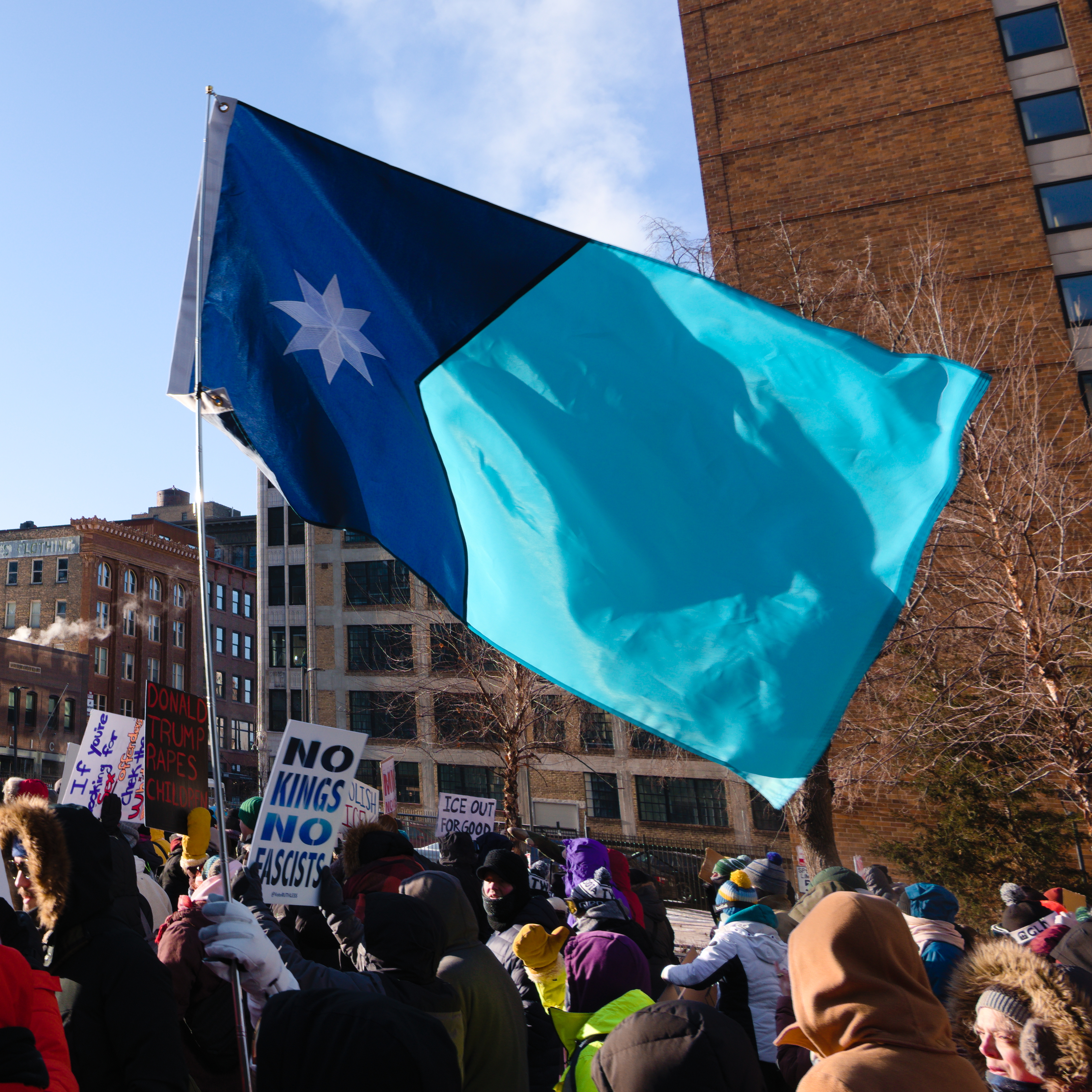
The flag flown during a Minneapolis protest.

== Gallery ==
Minnesota's state flags throughout the years; in 1957 and 2024 the flag became noticeably simpler, containing fewer distinct design elements, while 1983 modified the design elements without noticeably changing their quantity.

Flag of Minnesota, 1893–1957, obverse

Flag of Minnesota, 1893–1957, reverse

Flag of Minnesota, 1957–1983

Flag of Minnesota, 1983–2024

Flag of Minnesota, 2024–present

== See also ==
- List of Minnesota state symbols
