= Lady Slipper Lake =

Lake in the state of Minnesota, United States

- Location within Minnesota
- Location: Lyon County, Minnesota
- Coordinates: 44°34′16″N 95°37′44″W
- Type: lake

Lady Slipper Lake is a lake in Lyon County, in the U.S. state of Minnesota.

Lady Slipper Lake was named for state flower of Minnesota, the lady's slipper (Cypripedium reginae).
