= Seal of Minnesota =

Great Seal of the State of Minnesota
- Armiger: State of Minnesota
- Adopted: December 19, 2023 (effective May 11, 2024)
- Motto: Mni Sóta Makoce (English: Land where the water reflects the sky)

The Great Seal of the State of Minnesota is the state seal of the U.S. state of Minnesota. It was adopted on May 11, 2024, alongside the state flag, for Statehood Day. It features a common loon, Minnesota's state bird, wild rice, the state grain, and the North Star, representing the state's motto (L'Étoile du Nord), and is themed around Minnesota's nature. In the inner circle is the phrase Mni Sóta Makoce, a Dakota phrase that translates to "Land where the water reflects the sky", which is the origin of the state's name.

The previous seal's design drew criticism for its depiction of the relationship between the American pioneers and Native American tribes. In May 2023, the Minnesota Legislature created a commission to change both the seal and the state flag. The commission solicited designs from the public, and then selected a final design from the submissions. On December 5, 2023, they chose the design submitted by Ross Bruggink, with the modifications added on top by the commission.

== Purpose ==
The duly elected secretary of state is custodian of the state seal in accordance with the Minnesota Constitution. As with great seals in other jurisdictions, Minnesota's state seal serves to attest to the veracity of official government acts. In practice, the secretary of state uses the state seal to authenticate various instruments filed in his or her office, such as enrolled bills passed by the Legislature, executive orders and proclamations issued by the governor, oaths of office for state officials, state agency administrative rules, evidences of state debt, extraditions, certificates of registration for trademarks, notary public commissions, certifications of notarized documents, or changes to municipal boundaries, among many other public documents.

== Design ==
The current seal, which was approved in 2023, depicts a series of state symbols contained within a traditional round design, with lettering in an outer circle ringed by a series of gold rectangles and a collection of state symbols and other symbolism in the inner circle. There are official versions in color and black-and-white. The description is detailed in the official report of the State Emblems Redesign Commission.

=== Text ===
- The lettering around the circle is in Georgia bold font: **The Great Seal of the State of Minnesota.**
- In the inner circle is the phrase **Mni Sóta Makoce** in Montserrat-Variable font. This is the Dakota term for "Land where the water reflects the clouds", which is the origin of the state's name.

=== Symbols ===
- The outermost circle contains 98 rectangular **golden bars**, representing the state's 87 counties and 11 federally-recognized tribes
- A series of blue roundels between the inner and outer circles separates the "Great Seal" text from the imagery; these are decorative only.
- In the inner circle are images containing:
  - **Wild rice,** the official state grain of Minnesota;
  - The **common loon,** the official state bird of Minnesota, depicted with a red eye
  - A white, four-pointed **star** representing the state motto "L'Étoile du Nord", a French phrase for “**The Star of the North**”
  - **Trees,** shown as triangular green figures, representing the official state tree, Norway Pine and other natural areas
  - **Water**, stylized as blue waves, to represent the many lakes, rivers and other bodies of water in Minnesota.

== History ==
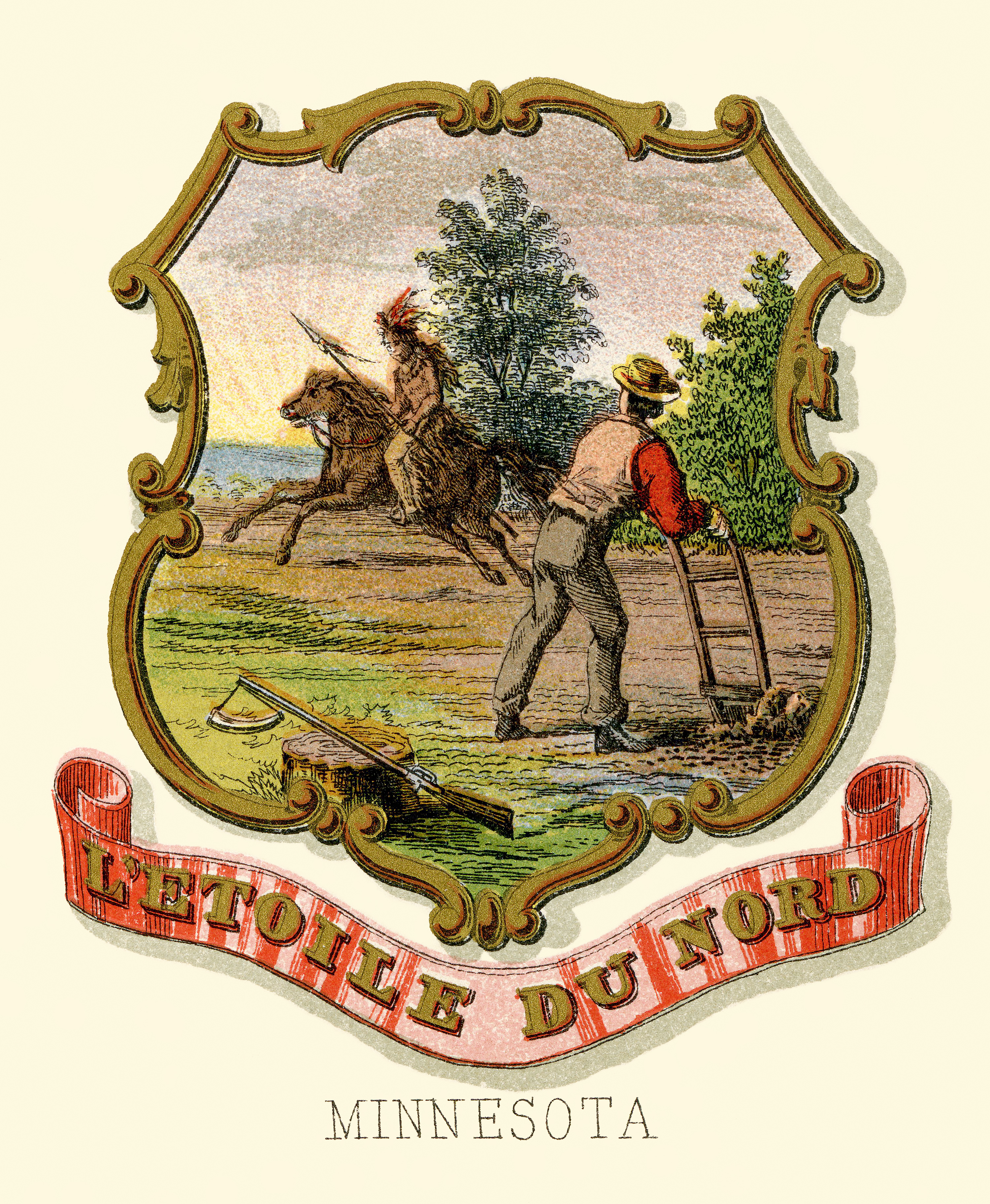
Coat of arms shown in a historical armorial of U.S. states from 1876

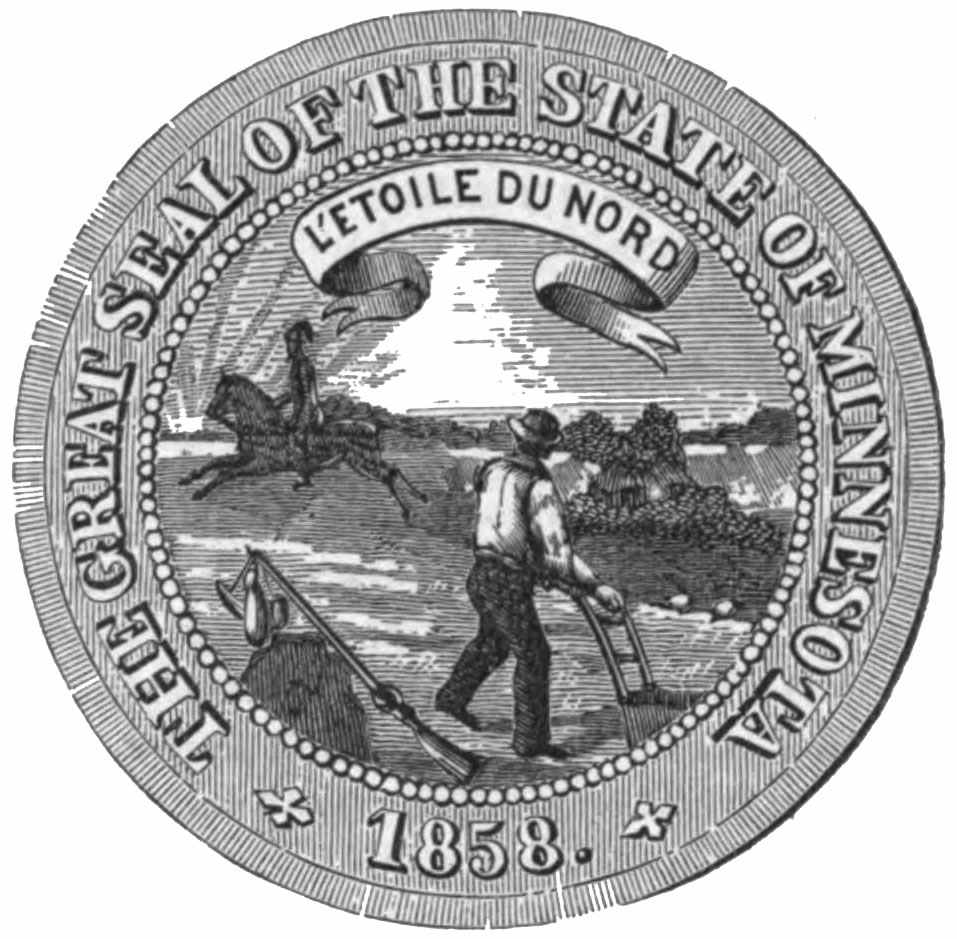
Seal of Minnesota (1861–1983)

Seal of Minnesota (1983–2024)

=== Territorial seals ===
The need for a seal came when Minnesota became a territory in 1849 and it was necessary to stamp official documents with something. Territorial governor Alexander Ramsey first used one of his own design—a sunburst surrounded by the motto, "Liberty, Law, Religion, and Education". The Territorial Council then approved a second version depicting a Native family offering a ceremonial pipe to a white visitor, symbolizing "the eternal friendship" between both the American settlers and Native American tribes.

Fur trader, territorial Representative and later on Minnesota's first governor, Henry M. Sibley then commissioned four alternative seals from Col. John J. Abert, an Army engineer and draftsman. One of the versions featured the theme occurring in the eventual state seal, i.e. an American settler plowing land just as a Native man rides horseback away towards the sun, of which Sibley asked a watercolor version, created by Army Capt. Seth Eastman. Sibley dismissed Territorial Gov. Ramsey's concerns that the imagery was too hostile towards Native people, and in fact, he doubled down on his idea by adding an ax and a Latin motto saying "I wish to see what is beyond" (Latin: Quo sursum velo videre) instead of adding a tipi to the territorial symbol. That seal became official in 1849.

=== Historic state seal (1858–2024) ===
When Minnesota became a state in 1858, Sibley officially became the state's first governor. The state should have changed the seal to reflect its new status, but, even though the Legislature approved a new design, Sibley insisted on the one he had promoted while he was a territorial representative. He changed the motto to the current one in French and reoriented the Indigenous man so that he would ride into the sunset. The Legislature yielded and approved Sibley's design in 1861. A similar design, with a few small modifications over the years, remained on the seal until 2024.

The seal was altered in 1983. The Indigenous figure was reoriented to ride more towards the American settler than away from him, and images of Saint Anthony Falls, the Mississippi River, and Norway pines were also added.

==== Symbolism of the 1858 seal ====
From 1858 to 2024, the seal included two human figures, an Indigenous man being on horseback riding off in the background, and an American pioneer in the foreground plowing his land. The Indigenous man was on horseback riding westward until 1983 and southward afterwards, symbolizing Indigenous people of Minnesota. The rider's horse and spear, and the pioneer's hand axe, long gun, powder horn, and plow represented tools of daily life. The tools used by the Native American and the farmer represented the tools used for labor and hunting while the stump symbolized the taming of the land and the importance of the lumber industry to Minnesota in 1858. The furrowing of the ground by the plow represented the submission of the land to the pioneer. The plow also symbolized the importance of agriculture to Minnesota and its future. On the western horizon was a sunset. The straight horizon line reflected the plains covering much of Minnesota.

The Mississippi River and St. Anthony Falls were depicted in the seal starting in 1983 to note the importance of these resources in transportation, industry and the settling of the state. Beyond the falls were three Norway pine trees representing the state tree and the three pine regions of the state: the St Croix, Mississippi, and Lake Superior.

==== Responses to the 1858 seal ====
When the 1858 seal was commissioned, it was fairly common for territories to adopt seals with the underlying theme of manifest destiny, i.e. the belief that American settlers were ordained by God to colonize new territories within North America in order to expand the United States borders. Mary, Seth Eastman's wife, wrote a poem that suggested that "the red man's course is onward" and that the land should come to "the white man's grasping hand".

Indigenous groups in Minnesota found the imagery offensive because their perception is that the seal celebrated the removal of Native American tribes. In the 1960s, the American Indian Movement criticized the design and called for its reevaluation. In 1968, the Minnesota Department of Human Rights concurred and called to replace it with something that would not show Native peoples in a derogatory light, but little action was taken. The design underwent a minor change in 1983 when the rider was turned southwards (towards the farmer) rather than westwards (towards the sunset), but this did not change the minds of many people about the symbolism. Lieutenant Governor Peggy Flanagan (DFL), who is a member of White Earth Band of Ojibwe, said the flag "literally [showed] the Native person being driven off their land" and refused to use the state seal in official documents prior to the redesign. According to Kevin Jensvold, leader of the Upper Sioux Community, few tribal reservations in the state would fly the flag containing the old seal for the same reason.

=== Contemporary state seal (2024–present) ===
==== 2023 redesign process ====
In February 2023, State Representative Mike Freiberg (DFL-Golden Valley) introduced a bill that would create a State Emblems Redesign Commission (passed as part of the state budget). Freiberg justified his decision by deriding the current state seal as "a cluttered genocidal mess" that was in need of change. New designs of the flag and the seal were to be submitted in a report to the legislature by January 1, 2024. The designs passed by the commission became official on May 11, 2024 (Statehood Day).

The commission put out an open call for submissions in October 2023, then selected six finalists. The commission then selected a final design, modified it by eliminating the nineteen stars in the background, eliminating the year of the state's founding, and replacing the state motto with the Dakota name for the state. On December 5, 2023, the commission declared the new design based on Ross Bruggink's submission the winner in the contest.

Seal of Minnesota (2024–present)

==== Symbolism of the 2024 seal ====
The seal features a common loon (the state bird), the North Star, Northern wild rice (the state grain), and some pine trees (the state tree being the Norway pine). The seal also contains the Dakota phrase Mni Sóta Makoce, which is translated to 'land where the waters reflect the sky'.

On December 19, 2023, the commission standardized the design by specifying that the outer seal will have 98 gold "boxes" to symbolize the 87 counties and 11 recognized Native American tribes of Minnesota.

==== Responses to the 2024 seal ====
The redesign commission's initial vote on the seal was unanimous in favor of Bruggink's design. The seal received some media praise for its symbolism and style. Changes made by the commission drew some initial opposition.

Prior to the 2024 redesign, Minnesota's state seal included a ribbon that read L'Etoile du Nord (translated to English as 'The Star of the North'). While the 2024 design continues to reference this motto through the inclusion of a four-pointed star representing the North Star, the decision to replace the L'etoile du Nord text with the Dakota language phrase Mni Sóta Makoce, the origin of the name Minnesota, was criticized by several Republican members of the Minnesota Legislature. Indigenous groups and commission members spoke out in support of the choice to include the Dakota name.

During commission proceedings, Minnesota Secretary of State Steve Simon initially urged his fellow committee members to exclude the Dakota phrase and keep the Minnesota statehood year, 1858, on the seal. The year was ultimately not added due to concerns from the Dakota community stemming from its association with broken treaties between the United States government and the Dakota people. Simon later commended the seal for "showcas[ing] the features of our state that we can all recognize".

== Other government seals of Minnesota ==
Former seal of the Minnesota Department of Transportation

Seal of the Minnesota National Guard

== See also ==
- Flag of Minnesota
