= Peter Fischer (politician) =

American politician

Member of the Minnesota House of Representatives from the 44A district
- Incumbent
- Assumed office January 8, 2013
- Preceded by: redrawn district

Personal details
- Born: June 21, 1958 (age 68)
- Party: Democratic (DFL)
- Spouse: Kristi
- Children: 3
- Education: Lakewood Community College (A.A.); University of St. Thomas (B.A.)
- Occupation: Nonprofit director of finance; Legislator
- Website: Government website Campaign website

Peter Fischer (born June 21, 1958) is an American politician serving in the Minnesota House of Representatives since 2013. A member of the Minnesota Democratic–Farmer–Labor Party (DFL), Fischer represents District 44A in the central Twin Cities metropolitan area, which includes the cities of Maplewood, Little Canada, and North St. Paul, and parts of Ramsey County.

== Early life and education ==
Fischer was raised in Maplewood, Minnesota. He attended Lakewood Community College, graduating with an A.A., and later the University of St. Thomas, graduating with a B.A. in business administration.

Fischer served in the Maplewood government on the Parks Commission and the Human Relations Commission. He also works in the finance division of Face to Face, a nonprofit organization serving housing insecure youth in St. Paul.

== Minnesota House of Representatives ==
Fischer was elected to the Minnesota House of Representatives in 2012 and has been reelected every two years since. He first ran in an open seat created after legislative redistricting.

Fischer chairs the Human Services Policy Committee and also sits on the Human Services Finance, Health Finance and Policy, and the Environment and Natural Resources Finance and Policy Committees. He chaired the Water Division from 2019 to 2020 and the Behavioral Health Division from 2021 to 2022.

=== Environment and natural resources ===
Fischer authored legislation to ban the wolf hunt in Minnesota. The measure was included in an amendment to a 2019 omnibus environment bill after contentious debate and bipartisan votes for and against. The provision was not taken up by the Republican controlled Senate and did not become law. Fischer authored legislation to limit "body-grip" style hunting traps because they inadvertently kill hunting dogs and other pets. He introduced bills that would ban the sale and use of lead fishing equipment in order to protect native swans, eagles and other wildlife.

==== Water quality issues ====
Fischer wrote legislation that created a Legislative Water Commission, and served as its co-chair until it was discontinued in 2019. As chair of the Water Division, he carried legislation to protect groundwater, including monitoring private wells. He has supported a ban on trichloroethylene after state regulators found a manufacturer in White Bear Lake was illegally polluting for more than a decade. He wrote a bill that would create a state program to prevent over-salting of sidewalks, roads, and parking lots, and supported efforts to address farm fertilizer nitrate's effect on water quality. Fischer has stated his openness to imposing greater regulations on frac sand mining. He has supported calls to address water contamination by microplastics and lead.

=== Other political positions ===
Fischer has carried "right-to-repair" legislation that would expand the ability of independent third-party businesses to repair electronics and other products. His bill would require public access to the parts, tools and manuals of a number of consumer products. He wrote legislation that would study a redesign of Minnesota's state flag, which was criticized for its design and depiction of Native Americans. He co-chaired a joint legislative commission on housing affordability.

== Electoral history ==
2012 Minnesota State Representative - House 43A
Party	Candidate	Votes	%
Democratic (DFL)	Peter Fischer	11,616	52.71
Republican	Stacey Stout	10,374	47.08
	Write-in	46	0.21
Total votes		22,036	100.0

2014 Minnesota State Representative - House 43A
Party	Candidate	Votes	%
Democratic (DFL)	Peter Fischer (incumbent)	8,314	50.64
Republican	Stacey Stout	8,068	49.14
	Write-in	35	0.21
Total votes		16,171	100.0

2016 Minnesota State Representative - House 43A
Party	Candidate	Votes	%
Democratic (DFL)	Peter Fischer (incumbent)	11,970	54.95
Republican	Bob Cardinal	9,767	44.84
	Write-in	45	0.21
Total votes		21,782	100.0

2018 Minnesota State Representative - House 43A
Party	Candidate	Votes	%
Democratic (DFL)	Peter Fischer (incumbent)	12,253	61.36
Republican	Bob Cardinal	7,691	38.52
	Write-in	24	0.12
Total votes		19,968	100.0

2020 Minnesota State Representative - House 43A
Party	Candidate	Votes	%
Democratic (DFL)	Peter Fischer (incumbent)	14,496	60.69
Republican	Paul Babin	9,360	39.19
	Write-in	29	0.12
Total votes		23,885	100.0

2022 Minnesota State Representative - House 44A
Party	Candidate	Votes	%
Democratic (DFL)	Peter Fischer (incumbent)	9,918	62.84
Republican	Alex Pinkney	5,851	37.07
	Write-in	15	0.10
Total votes		15,784	100.0

== Personal life ==
Fischer is married to his wife, Kristi. They have two daughters and a son. They reside in Maplewood, Minnesota.
