= L'Étoile du Nord =

Official motto of the U.S. state of Minnesota

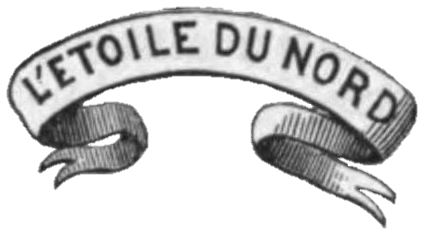
The motto, as it appears on the 1879 Seal of Minnesota

L'Étoile du Nord is the official state motto of the U.S. state of Minnesota. A French phrase meaning "The Star of the North", it is the only U.S. state motto in French. Adopted in 1861, the motto was used on the state's historic flag and seal and continues to be symbolized on the current flag and seal.

== History ==
The motto was chosen by the state's first governor, Henry Hastings Sibley, and adopted in 1861, three years after Minnesota's admission to the Union.

Other mottos Sibley considered included "Advance with Courage" and "Be Just and Fear Not".

== Symbolism ==
At the time, Minnesota was the northernmost U.S. state. The North Star is Polaris, which served as a beacon for explorers and guided runaway slaves.

The motto was adopted in French to address the Franco-Canadian settlers and explorers of Minnesota.

== Usage ==
=== In the state seal ===
Minnesota's first state seal, commissioned by Sibley, incorporated the motto on a scroll. The current seal of Minnesota incorporates the motto indirectly through a four-pointed star.

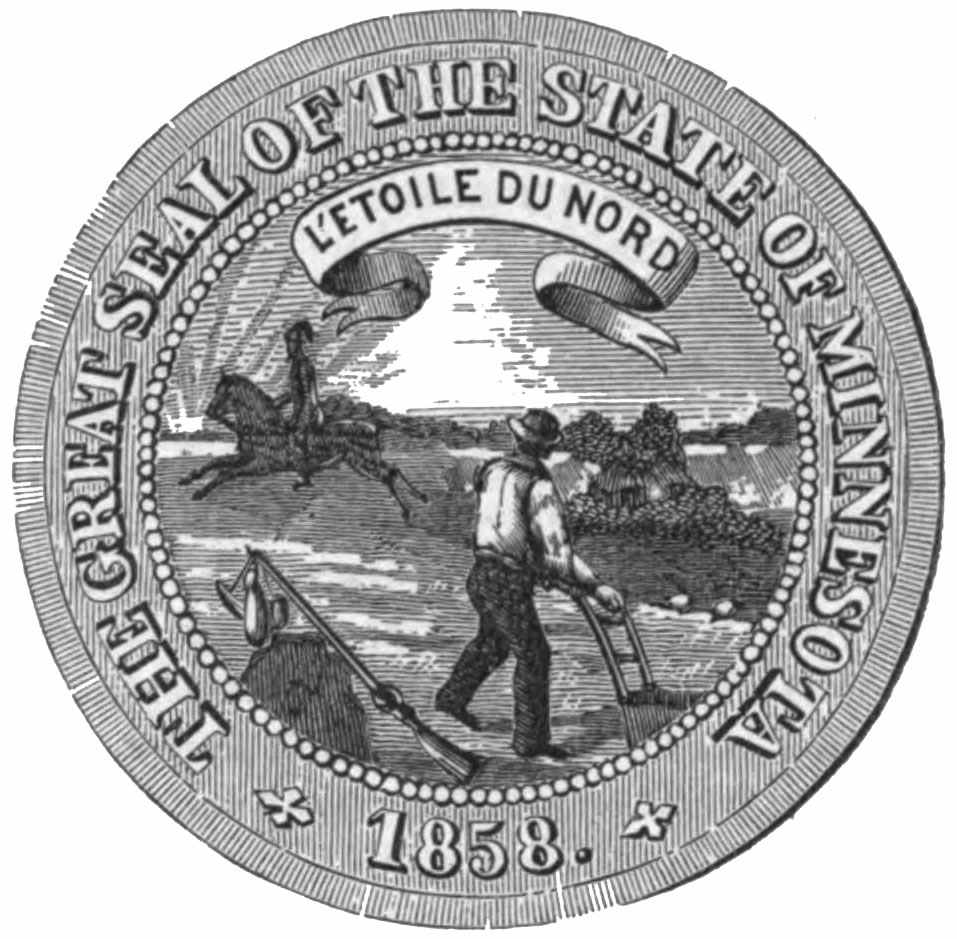
Seal design from 1861–1983

Seal design from 1983–2024

Current seal design

=== In the state flag ===
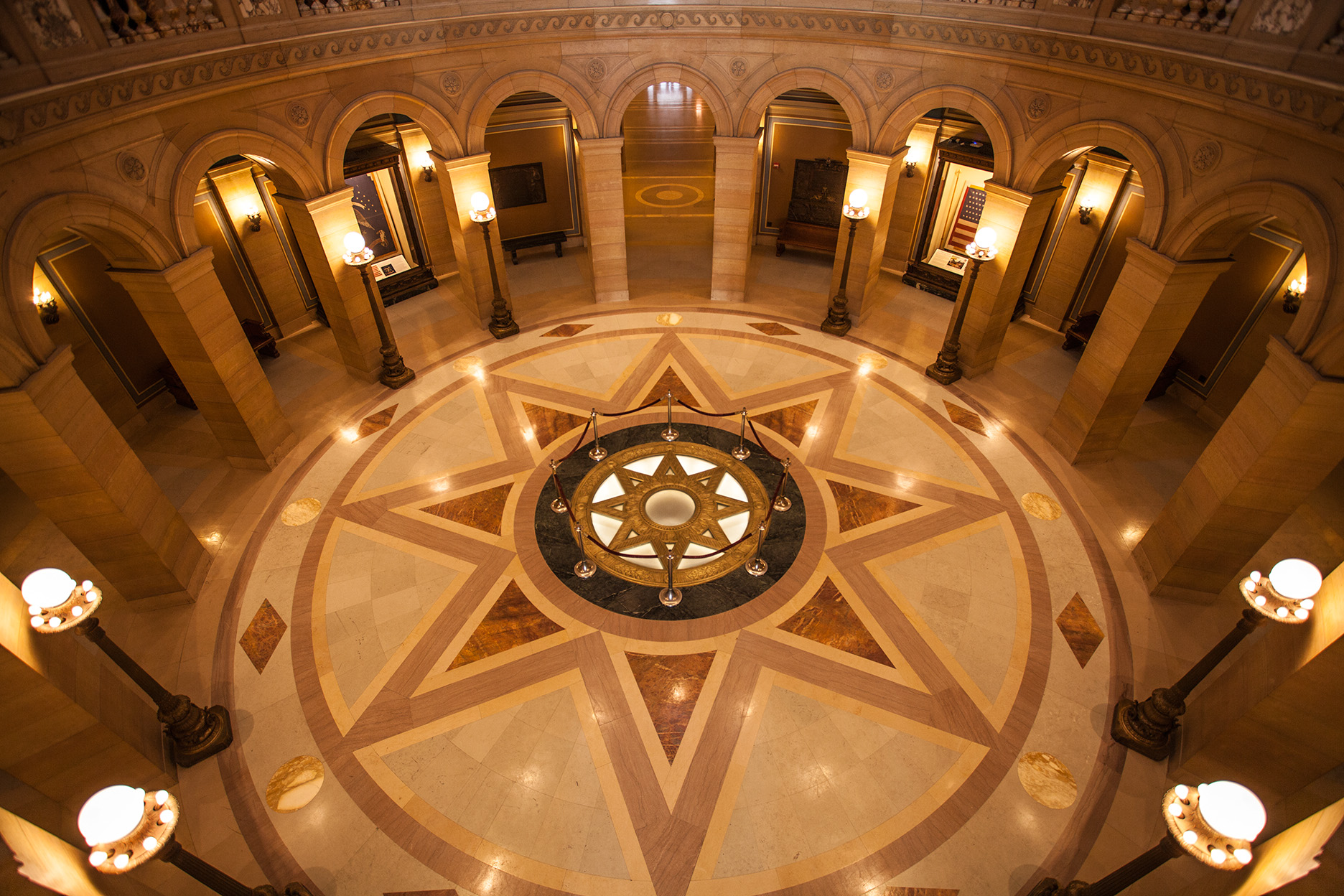
The eight-pointed star in the Capitol Rotunda that inspired the eight-pointed North Star on the current flag.

Until 2024, the state flag of Minnesota included the state's historic seal and thus the state motto. The new Minnesota flag, adopted in 2024, includes an eight-pointed star, its design inspired by the eight-pointed star in the Minnesota capitol rotunda and representing, among other things, the state motto.

Flag of Minnesota, 1893–1957, Obverse

Flag of Minnesota, 1893–1957, Reverse

Flag of Minnesota, 1957–1983

Flag of Minnesota, 1983–2024

Flag of Minnesota, 2024-Present

=== Other ===
Because of this motto, one of Minnesota's nicknames is The North Star State. The Minnesota North Stars ice hockey team chose the English translation for their name.

In 2024, Minnesota Governor Tim Walz introduced the Star of the North campaign to attract tourism and talent to the state.

== See also ==
- List of place names of French origin in the United States
- List of Minnesota state symbols
