= Mike Freiberg =

American politician

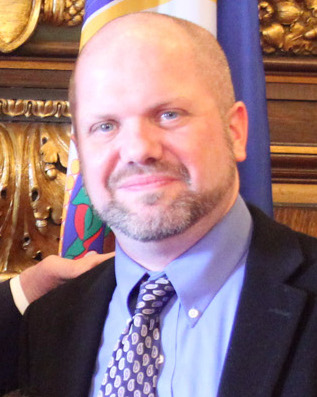

Member of the Minnesota House of Representatives District 43B (2023–present) District 45B (2013–2022)
- Incumbent
- Assumed office January 8, 2013
- Preceded by: Lyndon Carlson
- Succeeded by: Jess Lewis (elect)

Personal details
- Born: September 23, 1976 (age 50)
- Party: Democratic (DFL)
- Spouse: Lauren (m. 2007)
- Children: 2
- Education: Georgetown University (B.A.); William Mitchell College of Law (J.D.)
- Occupation: Public health attorney; Legislator
- Website: Government website Campaign website

Mike Freiberg (/ˈfɹaɪbɝɡ/, born September 23, 1976) is an American politician serving in the Minnesota House of Representatives since 2013. A member of the Minnesota Democratic–Farmer–Labor Party (DFL), Freiberg represents District 43B in the central Twin Cities metropolitan area, which includes the cities of Golden Valley and Robbinsdale and parts of Hennepin County.

== Early life, education and career ==
Freiberg was raised in Golden Valley, Minnesota. He has Jewish ancestry. He earned a Bachelor of Arts degree in government and Russian from Georgetown University and a Juris Doctor from the William Mitchell College of Law.

Freiberg was a legislative aide to U.S. Representative Jim Oberstar from 1999 to 2001. From 2005 to 2006, he was a committee administrator for the Minnesota Senate. He was elected to the Golden Valley City Council in 2007 and served until his election to the state legislature.

Freiberg has worked as an adjunct professor for William Mitchell College of Law. He is an attorney for the Public Health Law Center in Saint Paul, Minnesota.

== Minnesota House of Representatives ==
Freiberg was elected to the Minnesota House of Representatives in 2012, and has been reelected every two years since. He first ran for an open seat created by legislative redistricting.

In 2018, Freiberg endorsed fellow state representatives Erin Murphy in the DFL gubernatorial primary and Ilhan Omar for Minnesota's 5th congressional district.

Freiberg chairs the Elections Finance and Policy Committee and sits on the Commerce Finance and Policy, State and Local Government Finance and Policy, and Ways and Means Committees. He was an assistant minority leader from 2017 to 2018. From 2019 to 2020 Freiberg chaired the Government Operations Committee, and from 2021 to 2022 he chaired the Preventative Health Division of the Health Finance and Policy Committee.

=== Election policy ===
Freiberg sponsored legislation for Minnesota to join the National Popular Vote Interstate Compact, under which it would award its electoral votes to whichever presidential candidate wins the most popular votes nationwide; the compact goes into effect only when states that together have a majority of electoral votes have joined it. He has argued that the Electoral College has "become less and less representative". Freiberg authored legislation to close campaign finance disclosure loopholes, including increasing campaign finance reporting requirements for local and municipal elections.

Freiberg supports legislation that would raise the threshold for major-party status in Minnesota, saying the current system is "susceptible for mischief". The bill faced opposition from third parties as well as former Governor Jesse Ventura, who ran under the Reform Party in 1998.

=== Health care policy ===
In 2015, Freiberg wrote a bill requiring parents to talk to a doctor before parents opt their children out of vaccinations for diseases such as measles and chickenpox. The bill was supported by doctors from the Mayo Clinic, but failed to move forward during Republican control of the House. He also authored legislation that would support outreach programs to teach communities about the value of vaccinations and combat misinformation. Freiberg has authored "right to die" legislation that allows Minnesotans facing terminal illnesses to have medical aid in dying. The bill was modeled on an Oregon state law that has been in place for over 20 years.

==== Cannabis legalization ====
In 2019, Freiberg was the lead House author of legislation that would legalize cannabis by 2022, introduced as House File 420. The bill would legalize the drug for those over 21 and direct the Department of Health to regulate it and mitigate negative consequences, including researching and addressing physical and mental health issues related to the drug. The proposal was supported by Governor Tim Walz, but faced opposition in the Republican-controlled State Senate, where it was carried by fellow DFLer Melisa Franzen.

=== Other political positions ===
Freiberg wrote legislation in 2019 to lock Minnesota on daylight saving time. In 2022, he authored legislation to put Minnesota on permanent standard time, saying, "I just want to get rid of the clock change. I don't care which one we go on." The U.S. government has banned states from adopting permanent daylight saving time. Freiberg supported legislation to crack down on the use of "deep-fake" technology in pornography and campaign materials.

Freiberg supported legislation that studied a redesign of Minnesota's state flag, which had been criticized for its design and depiction of Native Americans. He also wrote legislation that would create a "companion animal board" aimed at curbing cruelty to animals and neglect.

== Electoral results ==
2012 Minnesota State House - District 45B
Party	Candidate	Votes	%
Democratic (DFL)	Mike Freiberg	15,053	65.95
Republican	Reid Johnson	7,740	33.91
Write-in		31	0.14
Total votes		22,824	100.0
Democratic (DFL) hold			

2014 Minnesota State House - District 45B
Party	Candidate	Votes	%
Democratic (DFL)	Mike Freiberg (incumbent)	10,750	66.94
Republican	Alma J. Wetzker	5,281	32.89
Write-in		27	0.17
Total votes		16,058	100.0
Democratic (DFL) hold			

2016 Minnesota State House - District 45B
Party	Candidate	Votes	%
Democratic (DFL)	Mike Freiberg (incumbent)	15,261	68.04
Republican	Alma J. Wetzker	7,098	31.65
Write-in		71	0.32
Total votes		22,430	100.0
Democratic (DFL) hold			

2018 Minnesota State House - District 45B
Party	Candidate	Votes	%
Democratic (DFL)	Mike Freiberg (incumbent)	15,727	72.44
Republican	Steve Merriman	5,954	27.42
Write-in		30	0.14
Total votes		21,711	100.0
Democratic (DFL) hold			

2020 Minnesota State House - District 45B
Party	Candidate	Votes	%
Democratic (DFL)	Mike Freiberg (incumbent)	17,929	70.63
Republican	Ken Fitzgerald	7,430	29.27
Write-in		26	0.10
Total votes		25,385	100.0
Democratic (DFL) hold			

2022 Minnesota State House - District 43B
Party	Candidate	Votes	%
Democratic (DFL)	Mike Freiberg (incumbent)	17,141	70.63
Write-in		434	2.47
Total votes		17,575	100.0
Democratic (DFL) hold			

== Personal life ==
Freiberg has been married to his wife, Lauren, since 2006. They have two children and reside in Golden Valley, Minnesota. Freiberg plays keyboard and has done so in the Minnesota State Band, the last state band in the nation.

Freiberg is agnostic, and co-founded Minnesota's "Secular Government Caucus".
