= Eric Enstrom =

American photographer

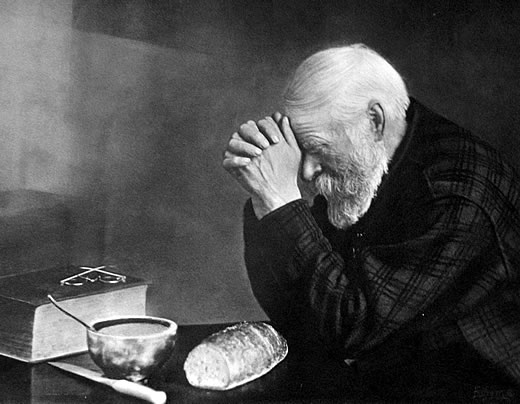
Grace by Eric Enstrom

Eric Enstrom (1875 – November 16, 1968) was a Swedish-born American photographer. Born near Mora, Sweden, he became famous for his 1918 photograph of Charles Wilden in Bovey, Minnesota. The photo is now known as Grace and depicts Wilden saying a prayer over a simple meal. In 2002, "Grace" was designated the state photograph of Minnesota.

Enstrom died in Grand Rapids, Minnesota, in 1968 after retiring to Coleraine.
