= Bovey, Minnesota =

City in Minnesota, United States

Bovey
- City
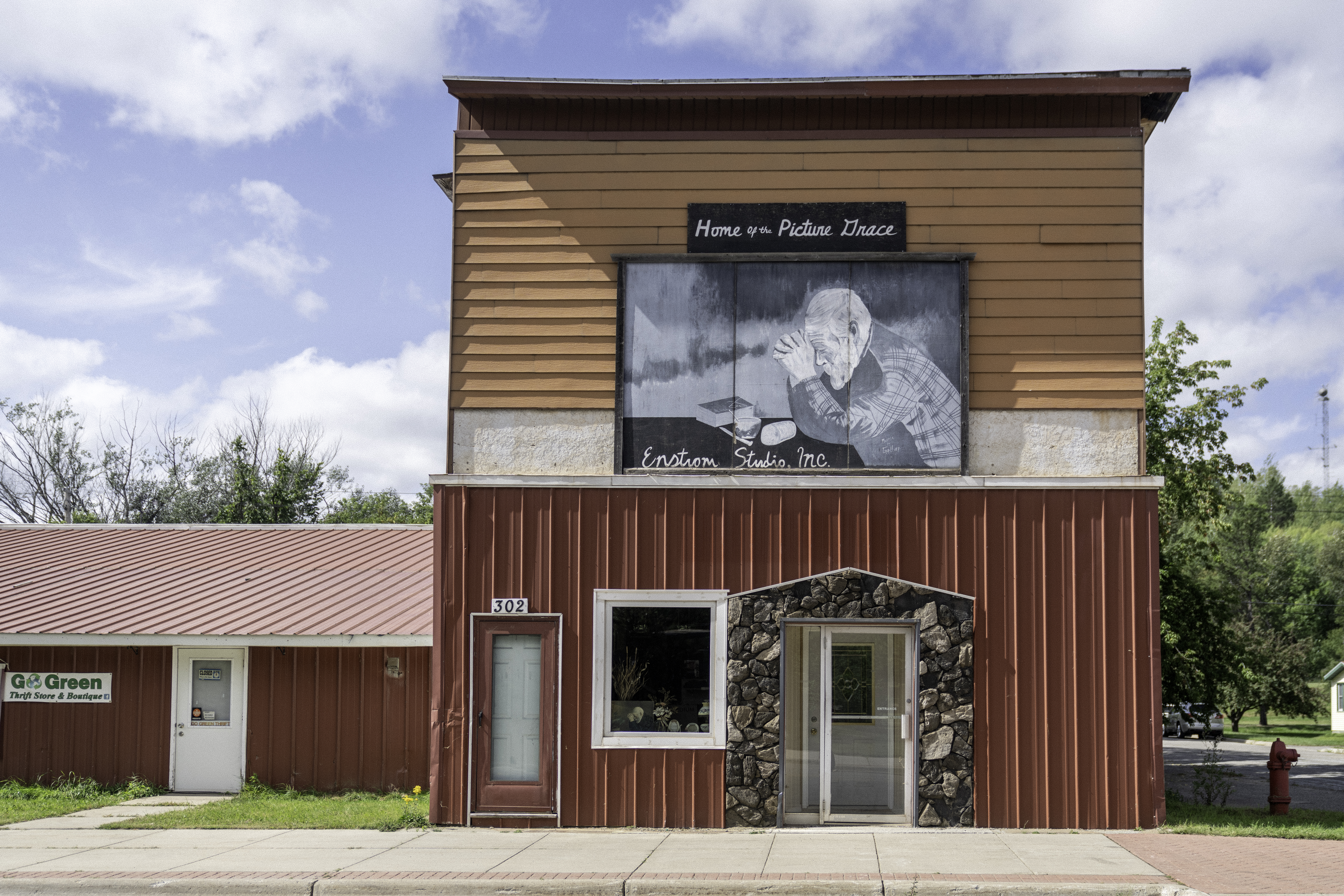
- Enstrom Studio building

- Location of the city of Bovey within Itasca County, Minnesota
- Coordinates: 47°17′46″N 93°24′48″W
- Country: United States
- State: Minnesota
- County: Itasca

Area
  - Total: 2.29 sq mi (5.94 km^{2})
  - Land: 2.29 sq mi (5.92 km^{2})
  - Water: 0.0077 sq mi (0.02 km^{2})
- Elevation: 1,319 ft (402 m)

Population (2020)
  - Total: 829
  - Density: 360/sq mi (140/km^{2})
- Time zone: UTC-6 (Central (CST))
  - Summer (DST): UTC-5 (CDT)
- ZIP code: 55709
- Area code: 218
- FIPS code: 27-07048
- GNIS feature ID: 0655489
- Website: boveymn.gov

Bovey (/ˈboʊvi/ BOH-vee) is a city in Itasca County, Minnesota, United States. It is part of Minnesota's Iron Range. The population was 829, at the 2020 census.

== Geography ==
According to the United States Census Bureau, the city has a total area of 2.30 square miles (5.96 km^{2}), of which 2.29 square miles (5.93 km^{2}) is land and 0.01 square miles (0.03 km^{2}) is water.

In recent years, the city, along with its neighbors Coleraine and Taconite, has been under a serious threat of flooding from the nearby Canisteo Mine Pit. The pit, which comprises a series of 19 mines that ceased to be worked in 1985, has now become a lake some 4.8 miles long and up to 300 ft deep. In June 2011, the water level was recorded as having reached 1316.1 feet above sea level, higher than low-lying areas of the town. A project to drain some of the lake to prevent it overflowing and swamping the town was due to commence in mid-2011. The most recent pit water level is 1316.60 MSL.

== Demographics ==
Historical population
Census	Pop.	Note	%±
1910	1,377		—
1920	1,324		−3.8%
1930	1,248		−5.7%
1940	1,355		8.6%
1950	1,320		−2.6%
1960	1,086		−17.7%
1970	858		−21.0%
1980	813		−5.2%
1990	662		−18.6%
2000	662		0.0%
2010	804		21.5%
2020	829		3.1%
U.S. Decennial Census

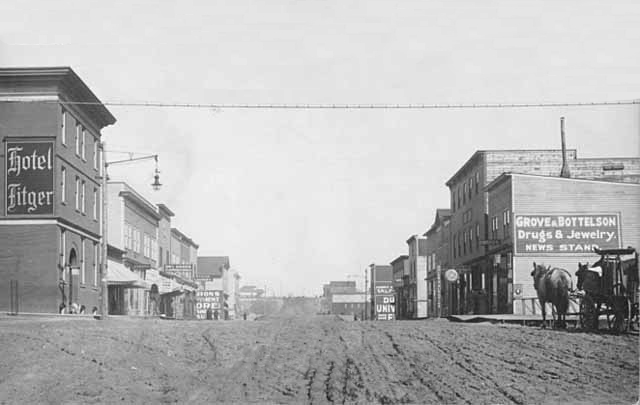
Second Street, circa 1905

=== 2010 census ===
As of the census of 2010, there were 804 people, 334 households, and 200 families living in the city. The population density was 351.1 inhabitants per square mile (135.6/km^{2}). There were 380 housing units at an average density of 165.9 per square mile (64.1/km^{2}). The racial makeup of the city was 93.8% White, 0.2% African American, 2.4% Native American, 0.4% Asian, and 3.2% from two or more races. Hispanic or Latino of any race were 2.4% of the population.

There were 334 households, of which 32.0% had children under the age of 18 living with them, 39.8% were married couples living together, 12.0% had a female householder with no husband present, 8.1% had a male householder with no wife present, and 40.1% were non-families. 29.9% of all households were made up of individuals, and 12.9% had someone living alone who was 65 years of age or older. The average household size was 2.39 and the average family size was 2.87.

The median age in the city was 33.5 years. 25.5% of residents were under the age of 18; 11.5% were between the ages of 18 and 24; 27.9% were from 25 to 44; 21% were from 45 to 64; and 14.2% were 65 years of age or older. The gender makeup of the city was 52.2% male and 47.8% female.

=== 2000 census ===
As of the 2000 census, there were 662 people, 302 households, and 169 families living in the city. The population density was 290.0 inhabitants per square mile (112.0/km^{2}). There were 326 housing units at an average density of 142.8 per square mile (55.1/km^{2}). The racial makeup of the city was 96.98% White, 2.11% Native American, 0.15% Asian, and 0.76% from two or more races. Hispanic or Latino of any race were 1.21% of the population.

There were 302 households, out of which 23.2% had children under the age of 18 living with them, 43.4% were married couples living together, 10.3% had a female householder with no husband present, and 44.0% were non-families. 36.1% of all households were made up of individuals, and 20.5% had someone living alone who was 65 years of age or older. The average household size was 2.19 and the average family size was 2.83.

In the city, the population was spread out, with 23.0% under the age of 18, 11.2% from 18 to 24, 24.9% from 25 to 44, 22.4% from 45 to 64, and 18.6% who were 65 years of age or older. The median age was 38 years. For every 100 females, there were 92.4 males. For every 100 females age 18 and over, there were 90.3 males.

The median income for a household in the city was $25,662, and the median income for a family was $33,750. Males had a median income of $28,571 versus $19,500 for females. The per capita income for the city was $16,127. About 19.5% of families and 22.3% of the population were below the poverty line, including 46.6% of those under age 18 and 3.4% of those age 65 or over.

== Arts and culture ==
Bovey hosts an annual harvest festival known as Farmer's Day, which festivities typically occur during Labor Day weekend. The holiday culminates with a parade on Labor Day, which is officially Farmer's Day.

== Notable people ==
- Eric Enstrom - photographer, notable for his photograph Grace which ultimately became the official photograph of Minnesota
- Adam Hauser – NHL goaltender born and raised in Bovey.
- Richard Hongisto – San Francisco politician born in Bovey.
- George Gilbert Wangensteen – Minnesota state legislator and lawyer
