= New Hampshire Academy of Science =

Non-profit organization for scientific research

NHAS
- The New Hampshire Academy of Science
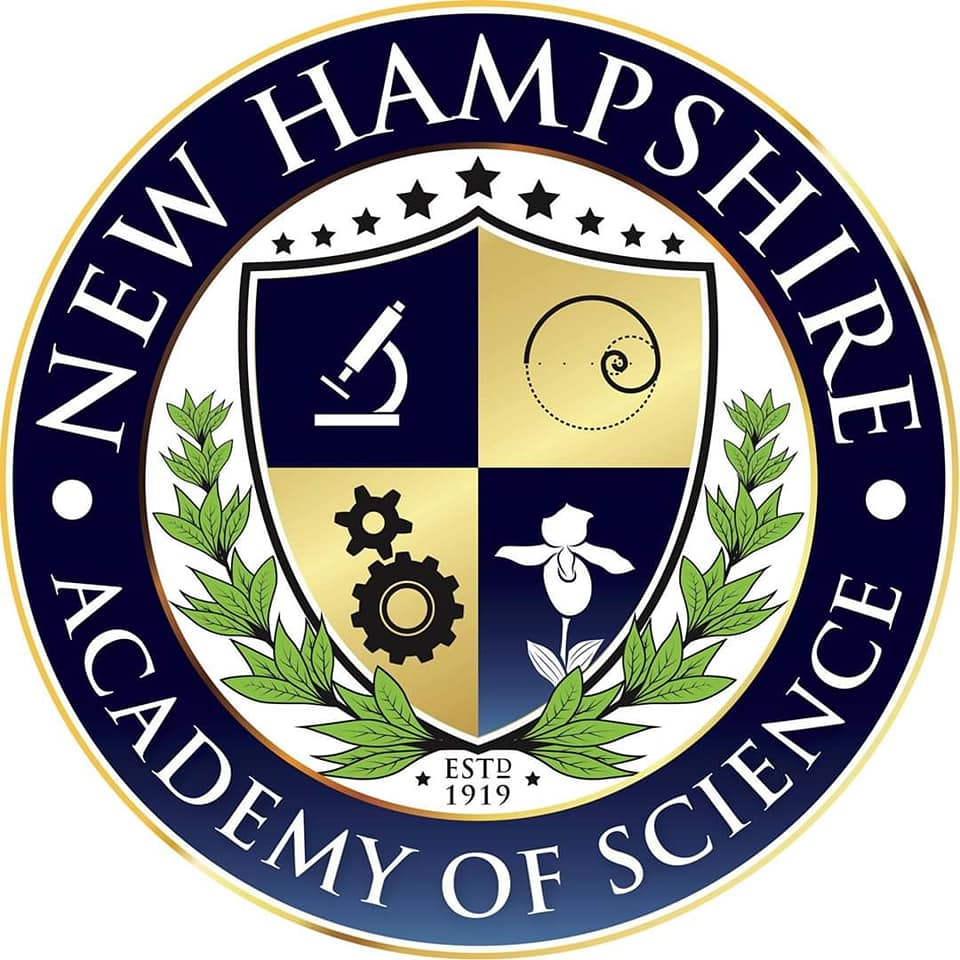
- Formation: May 24, 1919; 106 years ago
- Headquarters: Lyme, New Hampshire
- Executive Director: Peter Faletra, PhD
- Website: https://www.nhacadsci.org/

The New Hampshire Academy of Science, Inc. (NHAS) is a not-for-profit 501(c)(3) organization, established to promote science and scientific research in the state of New Hampshire. The academy was first established in 1919.

The NHAS operates a STEM Center with over 3000 square feet of lab space in Lyme, New Hampshire for middle and high school students to carry out research during summer and after school programs. Located on the border between New Hampshire and Vermont, NHAS serves students from both states, and has participants in its summer research programs from across the USA. A teacher professional development program has also led to satellite labs at local schools that are supported by the NHAS.

The NHAS currently has two federal grants to serve secondary school students and teachers: The National Institutes of Health/National Institutes of General Medical Sciences awarded the NHAS a Science Education Partnership grant in 2020 that will continue for 5 years, and a National Science Foundation, Innovative Technology Experiences for Students and Teachers grant that begins in 2022 and will continue for 4 years. Both grants include comprehensive support for secondary school students to perform authentic research at NHAS STEM facilities in NH and VT and at Colby Sawyer College.

The NHAS is internationally known for its research on the conservation, horticulture, and genetic analysis of Cypripedium species native to the northeastern USA. In 2024, its students published and presented their conservation research on endangered Cypripedium reginae, Cyp. parviflorum, and Cyp. arietinum of the northeastern USA at the 23rd World Orchid Conference (WOC) in Taiwan. The students received young investigators monetary awards from the WOC.

== Affiliations ==
The New Hampshire Academy of Science is affiliated with the:

- American Association for the Advancement of Science (AAAS)
- Colby-Sawyer College
- Dartmouth College
- Dartmouth Hitchcock Medical Center and Clinics (DHMC) / Dartmouth Health
- Fairbanks Museum and Planetarium
- National Institutes of Health (NIH)
- University of New Hampshire (UNH)
