= Grace (photograph) =

Photograph by Eric Enstrom

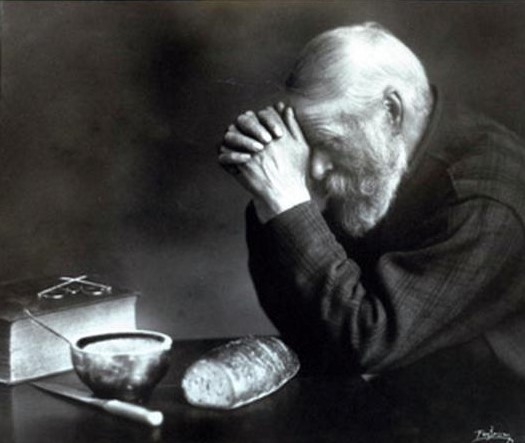
The original black and white photo. Later versions may have color or a second light source added.

Grace is a photograph by Eric Enstrom. It depicts an elderly man, namely Charles Wilden, with hands folded, saying a prayer over a table with a simple meal. In 2002, an act of the Minnesota State Legislature established it as the state photograph.

== History and background ==
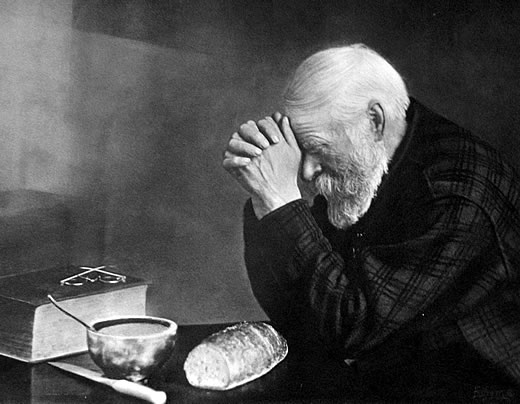
A later version with a second light source added.

The original photograph was taken at Enstrom's photography studio in Bovey, Minnesota. Most sources indicate 1918 as the year, though Enstrom's daughter Rhoda, born in 1917, claimed to remember being present when the photograph was taken, which might have been around 1920. The man depicted in the photograph is Charles Wilden, who earned a meager living as a peddler and lived in a sod house. While the photograph conveys a sense of piety to many viewers, according to the Enstrom family's story, the book seen in the photo is actually a dictionary. However, Wilden wrote "Bible" on the waiver of rights to the photo which he signed in exchange for payment, giving credence to the idea that, even if the actual prop used was a dictionary, it was a proxy representing a bible in the photograph. Likewise, local stories about Wilden "centered more around drinking and not accomplishing very much" than religious observation.

What happened to Wilden after the photograph is unknown. In 1926, he was paid $5 by Enstrom in return for waiving his rights to the photograph; he disappeared thereafter. After the photograph became popular, Enstrom attempted to track Wilden down but was unsuccessful. Numerous family members and local historians have also attempted to determine what became of Wilden, but have not been able to locate definitive evidence.

Enstrom first licensed the photograph to Augsburg Publishing House in 1930. In the 1940s, his daughter, Rhoda Nyberg, colorized the photo by hand. This version was featured in prints produced during the 1940s onward and became the more widespread and popularly known version of the photo.

Enstrom earned a modest sum from the photograph for the remainder of his life until his death in 1968. Nyberg died in 2012.

== Legacy ==
Gratitude by Jack Garren, c. 1960. Companion photograph to Grace.

In the 1960s, an Indiana gift company owner by the name of Edmund L. Dickson sent out a request for a companion photograph to Grace. Although over 1000 photographs were submitted, none were selected. Jack Garren, a Christian bookstore owner in Centralia, Illinois, heard of the contest and immediately thought of his grandmother, Myrtle Copple (1892–1975), who had been told for years that the man in Grace looked like her father. Having convinced his grandmother to sit for a series of photographs, the result was Gratitude, which depicts an old woman seated at a table with her head bowed in prayer, hands folded, and an open Bible. A pair of glasses (similar to the ones in Grace) rest on the Bible, and a small board with bread and cheese is placed next to it. Dickson chose Garren's submission, and thousands of photographs immediately sold in complement to Grace.

The water tower in the town of Bovey, Minnesota, has the following words painted on the side: BOVEY / home of the picture / "GRACE".

In 2014, the stage play Picturing Grace premiered. It is a dramatized retelling of the story behind the photograph, its photographer and subject. The play premiered in Itasca County, the same region in which the photograph was captured.
