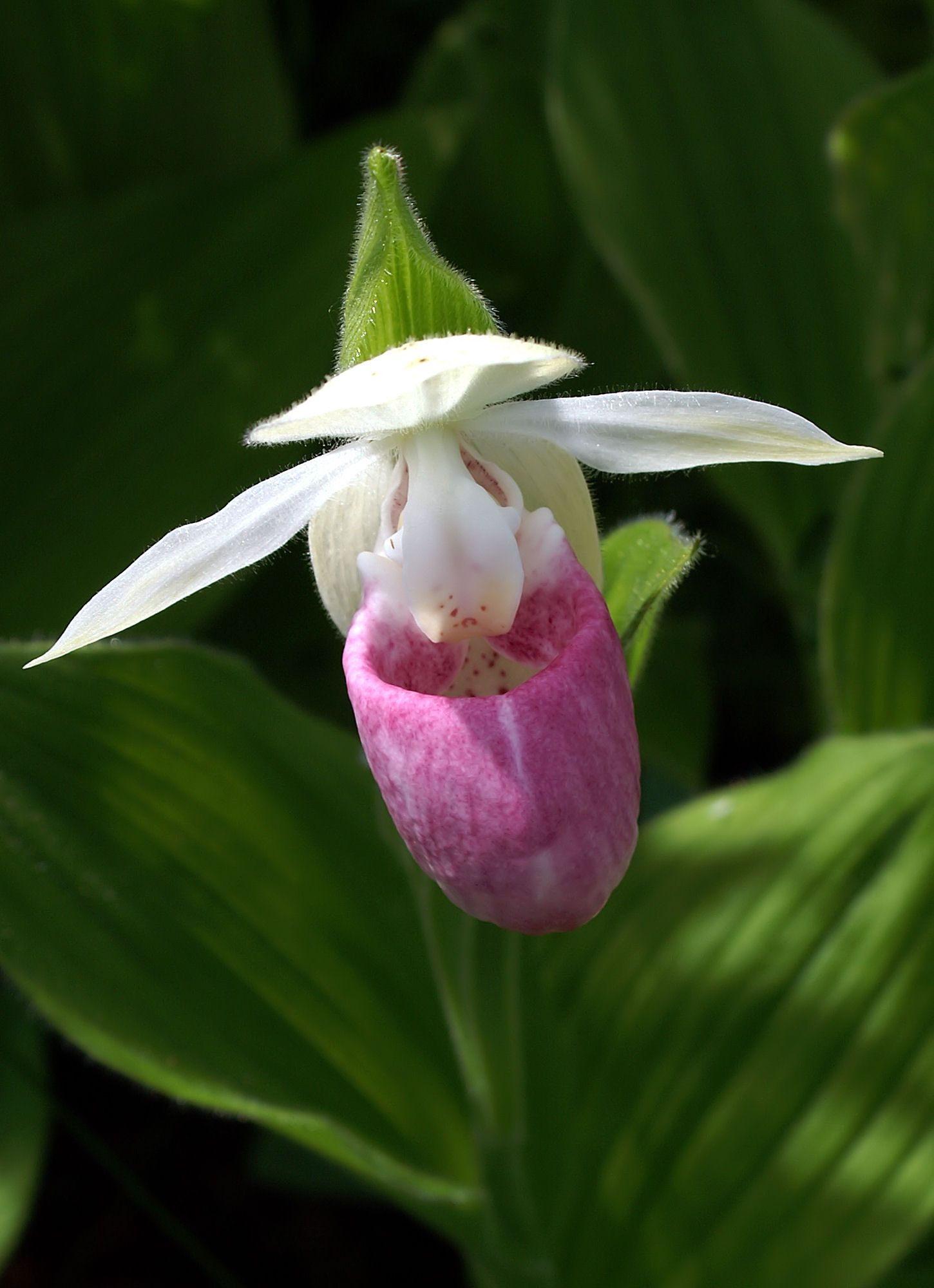

Conservation status
- Least Concern (IUCN 3.1)

Scientific classification
- Kingdom: Plantae
- Clade: Tracheophytes
- Clade: Angiosperms
- Clade: Monocots
- Order: Asparagales
- Family: Orchidaceae
- Subfamily: Cypripedioideae
- Genus: Cypripedium
- Species: C. reginae

Binomial name
- Cypripedium reginae Walter

Synonyms
- Cypripedium album Aiton; Cypripedium spectabile Salisb.; Cypripedium canadense Michx.; Calceolus reginae (Walter) Nieuwl.; Cypripedium hirsutum f. album R.Hoffm.

= Cypripedium reginae =

Species of orchid

Cypripedium reginae, known as the showy lady's slipper, pink lady's-slipper, or the queen's lady's-slipper, is a rare lady's-slipper orchid native to northern North America. Although never common, this plant has vanished from much of its historical range due to habitat loss. It is the state flower of Minnesota.

== Etymology ==
The species name reginae is Latin for "of a queen". Common names also include fairy queen, white wing moccasin, royal lady's slipper, and silver-slipper.

== Description ==
Like other lady's slipper orchids (subfamily Cypripedioideae) the Cypripedium reginae has flowers with a pouch-shaped labellum. Cypripedium reginae is a large, terrestrial orchid, growing 21–100 cm (0.7–3 ft) in height with many stems from the same rootstock. Each stem has three to five alternate, pubescent leaves. Each ovately shaped leaf grows up to 25 cm (10 in) long and 16 cm (6 in) broad. Flowering stems one to three large, white and pink flowers. The upper petals are white, up to 4 cm (2 in) in length and 1.5 cm (0.59 in) across. The pouch-shaped labellum is rose-pink to magenta 2.5–5.5 cm (0.98–2.17 in) in length.

Despite producing a large amount of seeds per seed pod, it reproduces largely by vegetative reproduction.

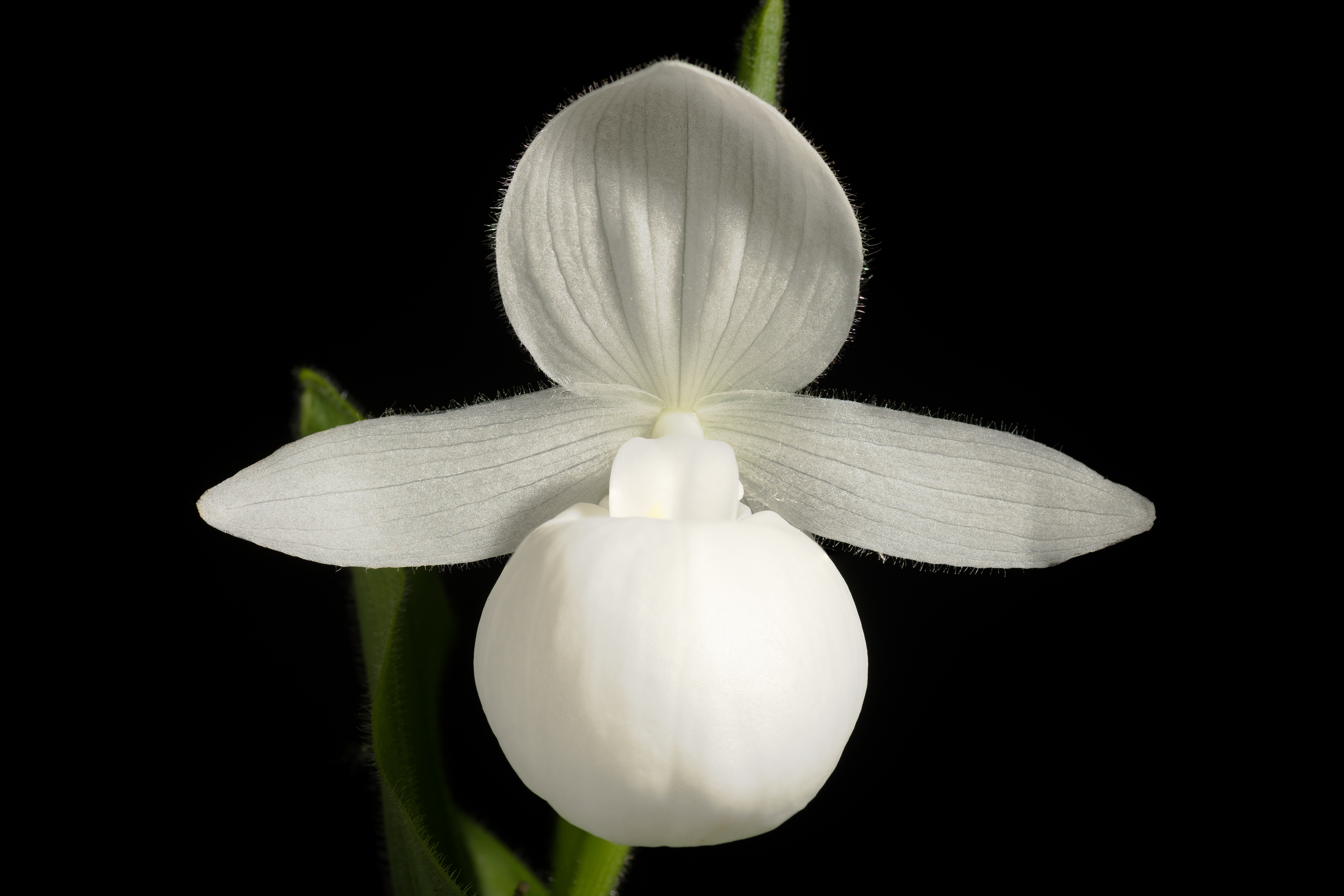
Alba form of flower

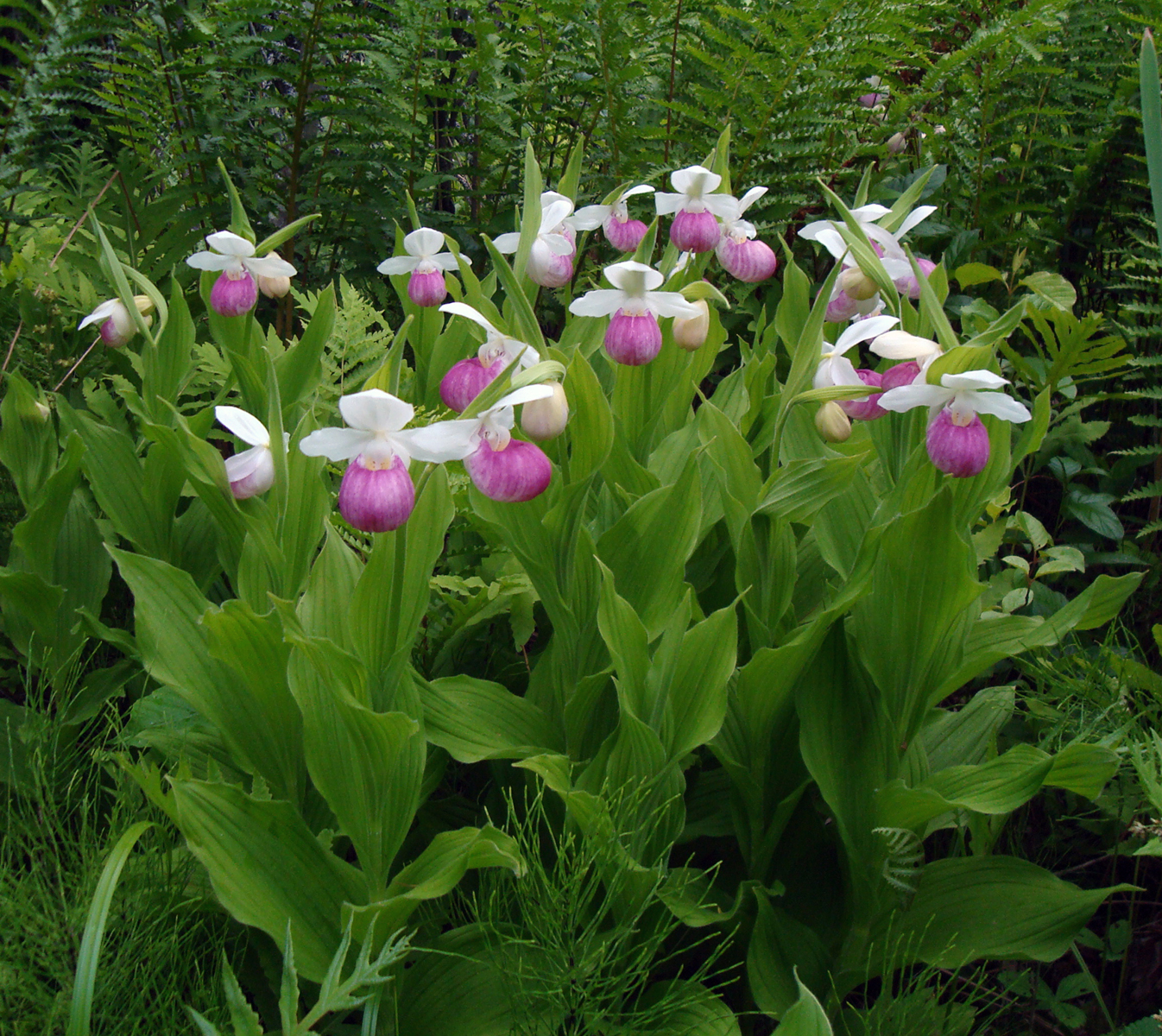
Growing in Vermont

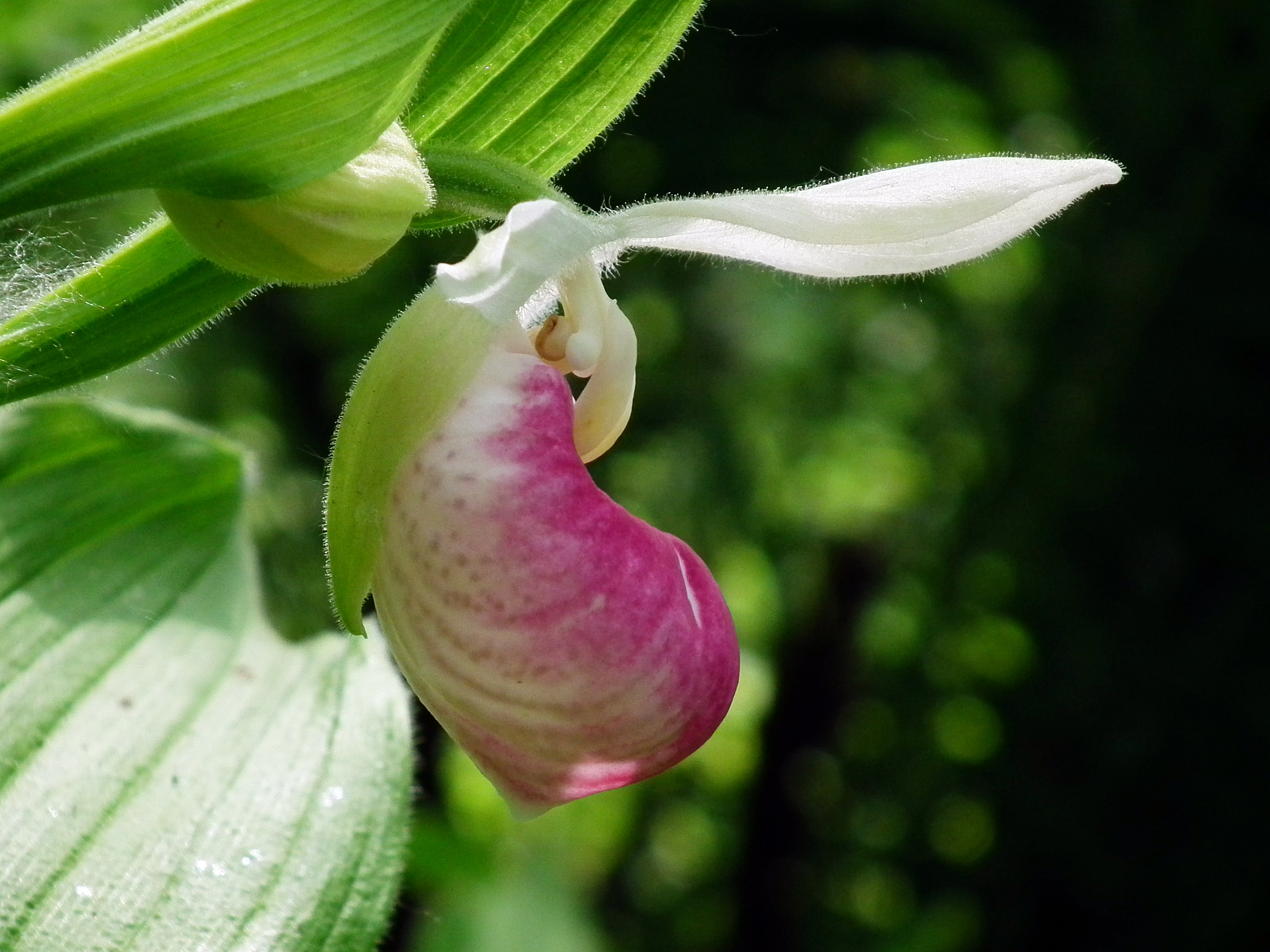
Flower in profile

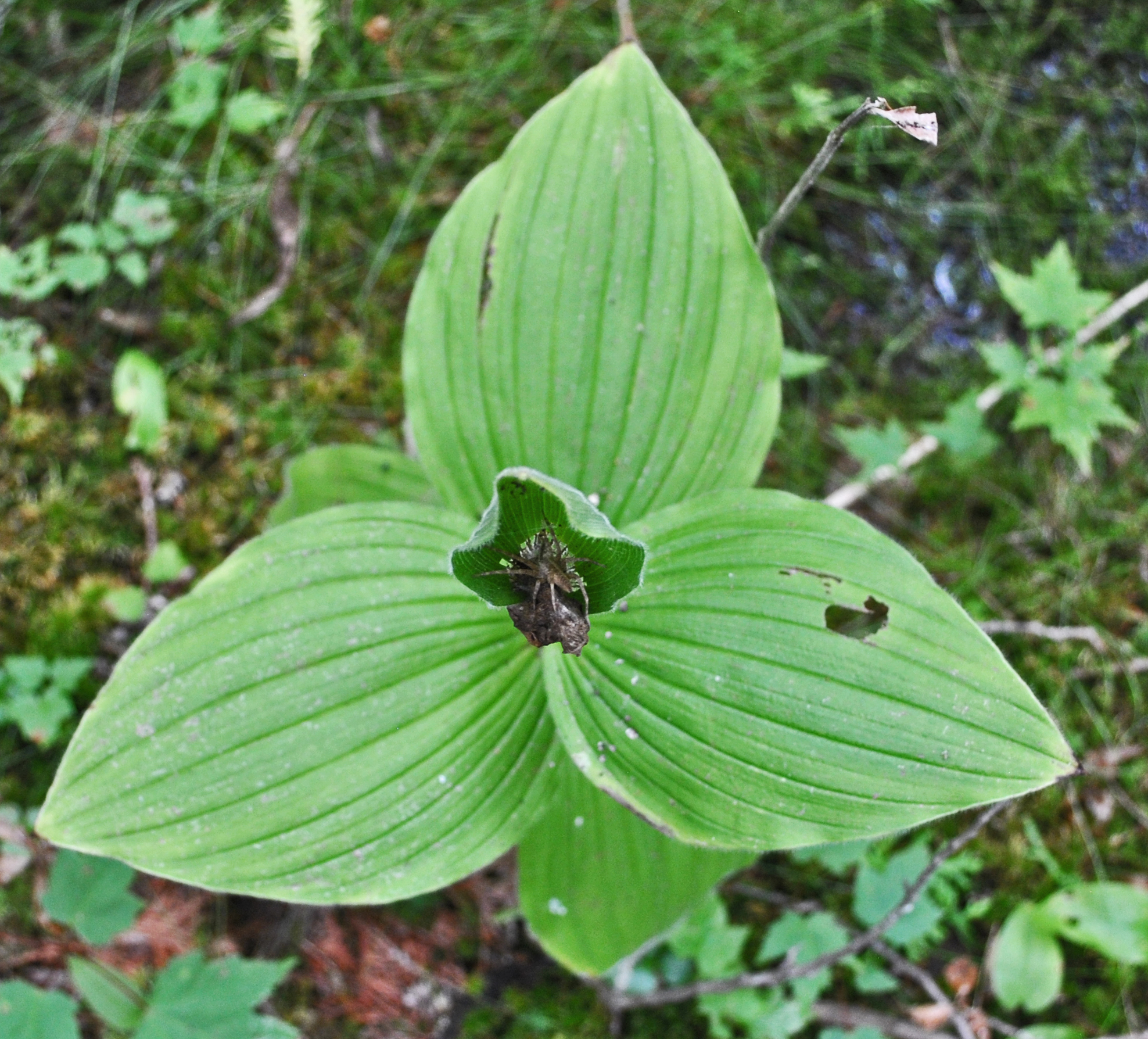
Broad, pubescent leaves

== Habitat ==
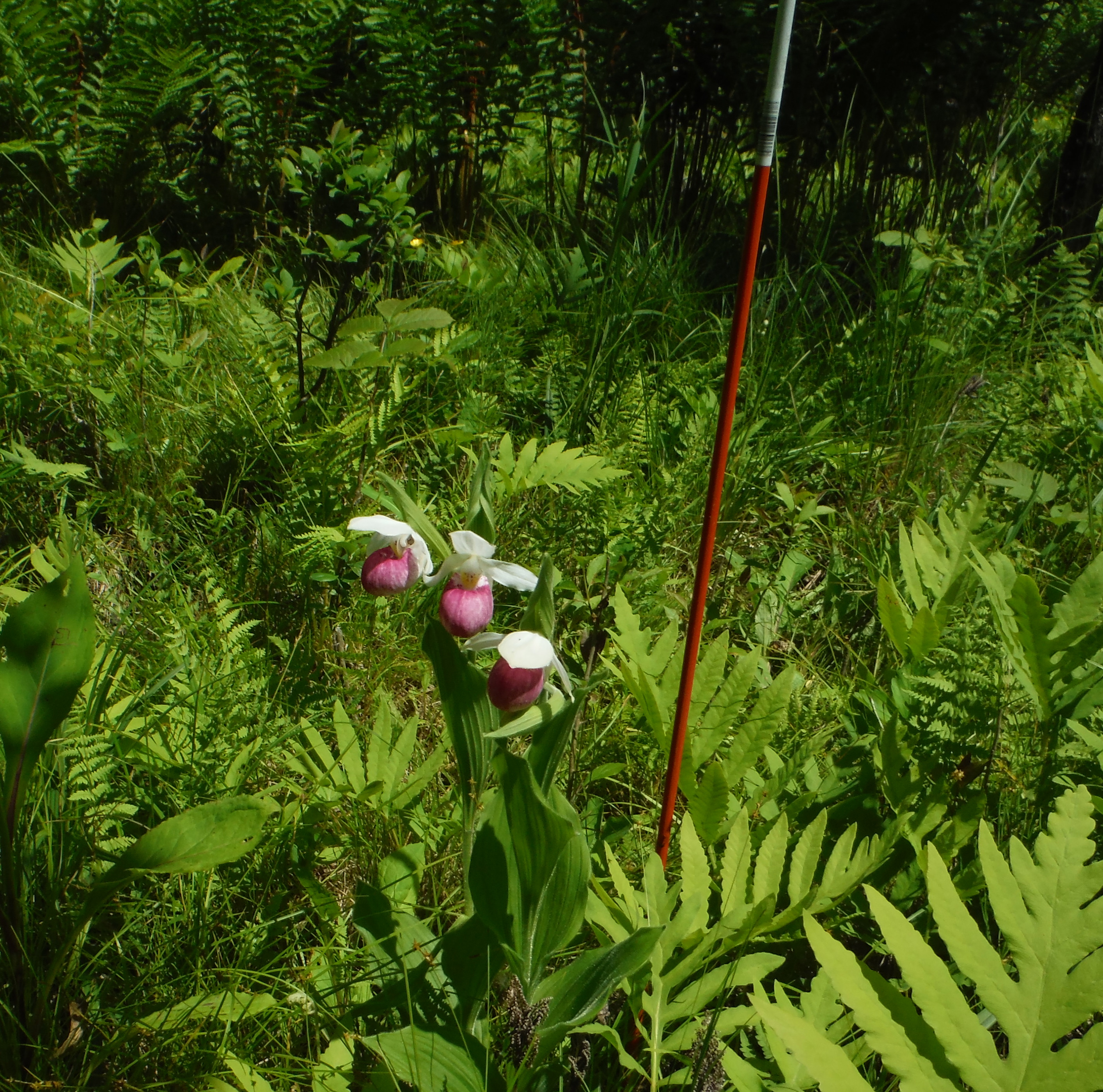
In a forested fen in Williamstown, Massachusetts

Cypripedium reginae grows in wetlands such as fens, wooded swamps, and riverbanks. Cyp. reginae thrives in neutral to basic soils but can be found in slightly acidic conditions. The plants often form in clumps by branching of the underground rhizomes. Its roots are typically within a few inches of the top of the soil. It prefers very loose soils and when growing in fens it will most often be found in mossy hummocks.

It can tolerate full sun but prefers partial shade for some part of the day. When exposed to full sun, the flower lip is somewhat bleached and less deeply colored. It is occasionally eaten by white-tailed deer.

Cypripedium reginae can be found in Canada from Saskatchewan east to Atlantic Canada, and the United States from North Dakota east to the Atlantic and south to Arkansas and Tennessee.

== Reproduction ==
Cypripedium reginae reproduces sexually and depends on insects such as syrphid flies, beetles and Megachile bees for pollination. The structure of the flower creates a tight space through which insects have to squeeze. A pollinating insect first passes by the stigma, and upon exiting the trap rubs against the anther. Pollination typically occurs in June and the seed pod or fruit is ripe by September and dehisces by October. Although a single seed pod can produce over 50,000 seeds, low germination and a seed-to-flowering term of about eight years indicate that sexual reproduction is inefficient. Asexual reproduction from rhizomes is a common means of sustaining a population.

It flowers in early to midsummer, usually with 1 to 2 flowers per stalk, less commonly 3 or 4.

== Conservation ==
Cypripedium reginae is quite rare. Its increasing rarity is attributable to destruction of a suitable alkaline habitat; it is sensitive to hydrologic disturbances, and is threatened by wetland draining, water contamination, habitat destruction and horticultural collectors. Browsing by an exploding deer population stunts or eliminates the plant's growth.

The plant is classified as imperiled (SRANK S2) or critically imperiled (S1) in Arkansas, Connecticut, Illinois, Iowa, Missouri, New Brunswick, New Hampshire, New Jersey, Newfoundland and Labrador, North Dakota, Nova Scotia, Ohio, Pennsylvania, Prince Edward Island, Saskatchewan, Tennessee, Virginia and West Virginia. It is considered vulnerable (S3) in Indiana, Maine, Manitoba, Massachusetts, New York, Quebec, Vermont, Wisconsin, Rhode Island, and several areas of eastern Canada. It is known to occur in only 14 locations in Massachusetts (as of 2016). It was historically found in Kentucky and North Carolina, but has not been found recently.

The only provinces to rank Cyp. reginae as apparently secure (S4) are Ontario and Manitoba. There are no SRANKs for the U.S. states of Minnesota and Michigan, but the plant is found in 61 of Michigan's 83 counties, and 33 of the 87 counties in Minnesota.

With funding from the San Diego Orchid Society, The New Hampshire Orchid Society, and the National Institutes of Health, the New Hampshire Academy of Science has performed extensive research regarding the conservation and genetic analysis of Cyp. species native to northern New England. Their researchers have published research papers and numerous abstracts and presented their research in the annual meeting notes of the AAAS and at the New England Science Symposium at Dartmouth College on Cyp. species found in VT and NH.

== Cultivation ==
The showy lady's slipper has been a subject of horticultural interest for many years, and was known to Charles Darwin who, like many, was unsuccessful in cultivating the plant.

It has low seed germination rates and slow maturation to flowering. This makes it more vulnerable to illegal collection. It was historically difficult to raise from seed in sterile culture or in greenhouse conditions, taking many months to germinate in sterile culture. In the 1990s a group of high school students in New Hampshire, under the direction of Dr. Peter Faletra, made substantial progress on axenic culture from seed and were able to obtain over 50% germination levels in about 3 weeks. Efforts at micropropagation have had marginal success.

Methods on transplanting seedlings raised in axenic culture to artificial fens have been advanced by The New Hampshire Academy of Science and can be found at the website .

== Cultural significance ==
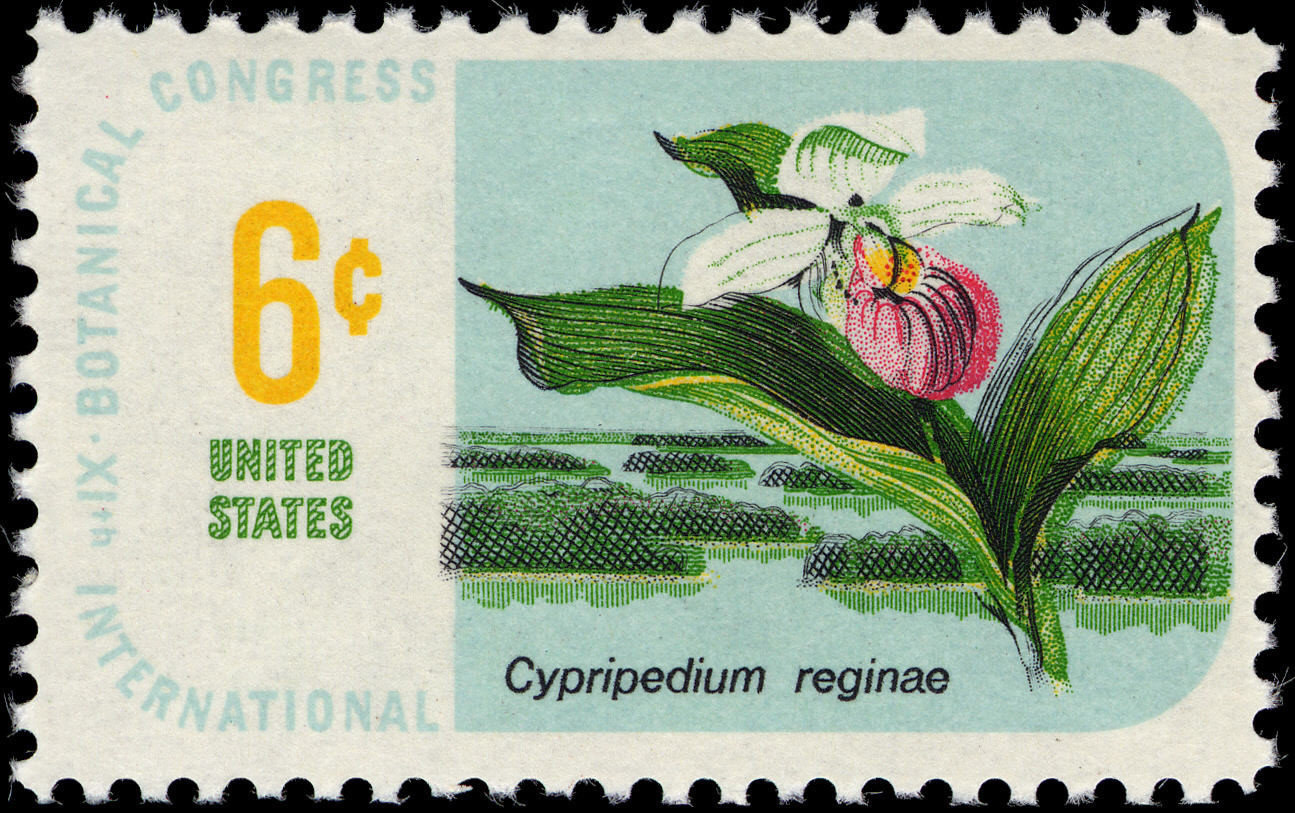
On a 1969 U.S. stamp

The plant became the state flower of Minnesota in 1902 and was protected by state law in 1925. It is illegal to pick or uproot a pink-and-white lady's slipper flower in Minnesota.

Although this plant was chosen as the provincial flower for Prince Edward Island in 1947, it is so rare on the island that another lady's-slipper, C. acaule (moccasin flower or pink lady's slipper), replaced it as the province's floral emblem in 1965.

== Chemistry ==
Cypripedium reginae contains an irritant, cypripedin, a phenanthrenequinone. The plant is known to cause dermatitis on the hands and face. The first report of the allergy reaction was in 1875 by H. H. Babcock in the United States, 35 years before the term "allergy" was coined. The allergen was later isolated in West Germany by Bjorn M. Hausen and associates.

=== Medicine ===
The Cypripedium species have been used in native remedies for dermatitis, tooth aches, anxiety, headaches, as an antispasmodic, stimulant and sedative, but the preferred species for these uses are Cypripedium parviflorum and Cypripedium acaule, used as topical applications or tea.

== Dangers ==
The foliage hairs may cause a rash similar to the one caused by poison ivy.

== Other sources ==
- Gray's Manual of Botany of the Northern United States, American Book Company, 1889.
