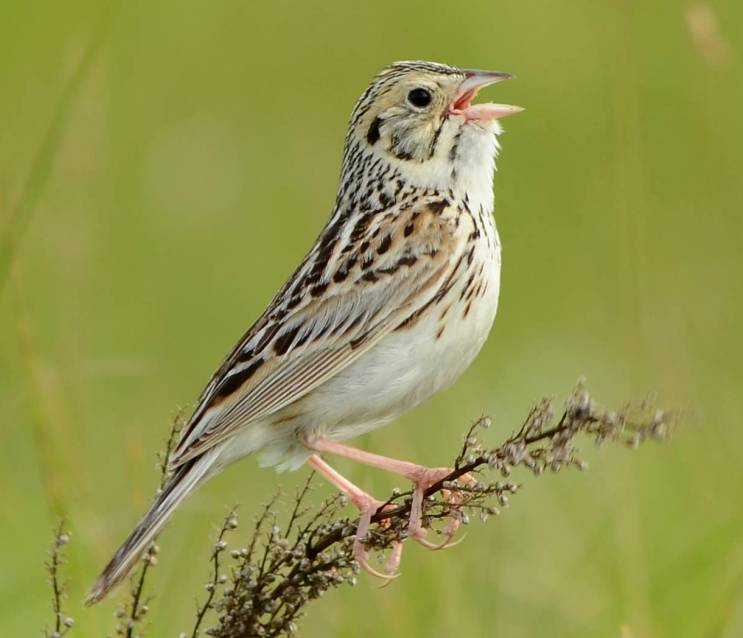

Conservation status
- Least Concern (IUCN 3.1)

Scientific classification
- Kingdom: Animalia
- Phylum: Chordata
- Class: Aves
- Order: Passeriformes
- Family: Passerellidae
- Genus: Centronyx
- Species: C. bairdii

Binomial name
- Centronyx bairdii (Audubon, 1844)

Synonyms
- Passerculus bairdii

= Baird's sparrow =

Species of bird

Baird's sparrow (Centronyx bairdii) is a species of North American birds in the family Passerellidae of order Passeriformes. It is a migratory bird native to the United States, Canada, and Mexico.

== Taxonomy ==
The Baird's sparrow was first described in North Dakota in 1843 by John James Audubon, and another record of this species was not made for 29 years following its discovery. It was named after the American naturalist Spencer Fullerton Baird.

== Description ==
The Baird's sparrow can be identified as a small brown streaked sparrow. Their faces are a yellow-brown color featuring subtle black markings. These birds have a narrow band of brown streaks on their chests. This species can be distinguished from others by its unique broad ochre central crown stripe. Juveniles exhibit similar coloration but often have more streaking. Adult size is comparable for both males and females, no sexual dimorphism is exhibited. Adults are generally about 12 cm (5") and weigh 17–21 g (½ to ¾ oz); their wingspan is usually around 23 cm (9").

They are larger than LeConte's sparrow and do not exhibit orange coloration on their faces. They exhibit very similar coloration and patterning to Henslow's sparrow but do not have green coloration on their faces. The Savannah sparrow is more heavily streaked and has an extra white marking on its head.

== Distribution and habitat ==
The Baird's sparrow migrates from its summer breeding habitat, the tall grass prairies of north central United States and South Central Canada, to spend winters in northern Mexico and the southern tip of the United States near Texas. Due to this migratory behavior, they may be spotted all across the Midwest portion of the United States during migratory seasons, but most frequently can be found in North Dakota, South Dakota, Minnesota, Montana, and Canada during the summer.

This species of sparrow resides in grassland habitats. These birds rely on the (now diminishing) tallgrass prairies, mixed grass prairies, and moister fescue prairies of northern United States and southern Canada. The dwindling status of this habitat puts many animals whose lifestyles rely on these ecosystems in peril. Land featuring woody vegetation and cultivated land is generally not a suitable environment for Baird's sparrows to thrive in.

== Diet ==
Baird's sparrow feed on the ground, picking up insects and grass seeds.

== Conservation status and threats ==
There is some concern about the conservation status of Baird's sparrows; their numbers are reduced compared to historic numbers. This species is listed under the IUCN Red List under the category of "least concern". Maintaining the original habitat is important for this species because artificial habitat recreation is not suitable for these birds. Fragmentation can lead to adverse conditions for Baird's sparrows, including increased nest parasitism.

== Reproduction/life cycle ==
Baird's sparrows nest on the ground in either depressions or tufts of grass. These nests are usually made out of grass and consist of two layers, with finer material on the inside. These birds nest in small loose colonies. A normal clutch size is usually two to six white-gray eggs with brown spots. These birds are altricial, and rely on parental care for survival after hatching.

Breeding populations of Baird's sparrow fluctuate from year to year. This is most likely the result of a variable environment including factors like wildfires, drought, and the movement of American bison herds. When confronted with danger or a potential predator, Baird's sparrows may evade their foes by running on foot rather than flying away.
