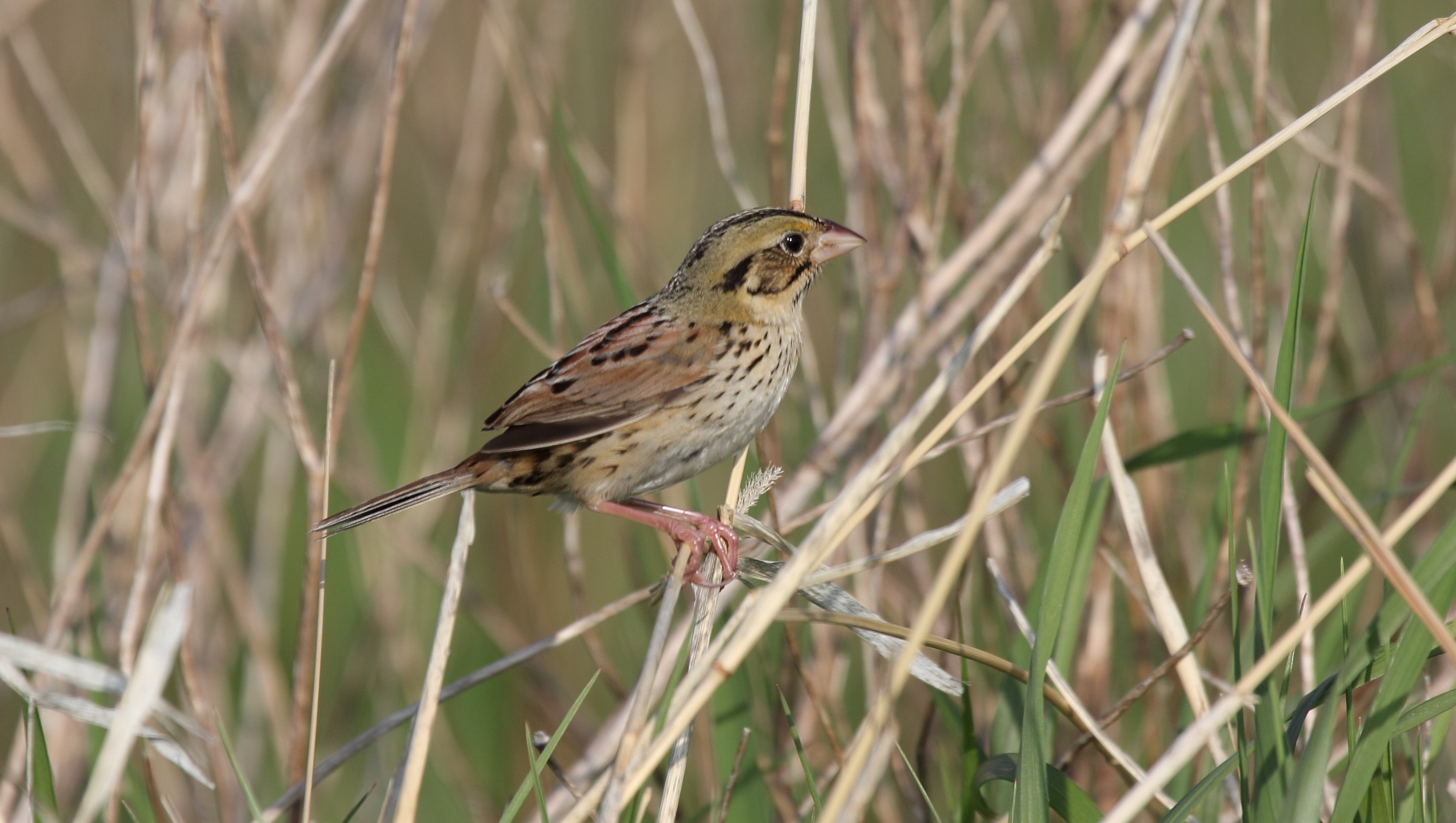
- Henslow's sparrow (C. henslowii)

Scientific classification
- Kingdom: Animalia
- Phylum: Chordata
- Class: Aves
- Order: Passeriformes
- Family: Passerellidae
- Genus: Centronyx; Baird, 1858

Species
- See text

= Centronyx =

Genus of birds

Centronyx is a genus of birds in the family Passerellidae, in the group known as American sparrows.

== Species ==
Genus Centronyx – Baird, 1858 – two species
Common name	Scientific name and subspecies	Range	Size and ecology	IUCN status and estimated population
Henslow's sparrow	Centronyx henslowii (Audubon, 1829) Two subspecies: C. h. henslowii (Audubon, 1829): western Henslow's sparrow; C. h. susurrans (Brewster, 1918): eastern Henslow's sparrow	Breeds in fields and meadows across interior eastern North America, from New York and Pennsylvania across the midwest to Kansas, with a disjunct population in North Carolina; winters in weedy fields in the American south, from Texas and Arkansas east to South Carolina, Georgia and Florida	Size: 11–13 cm (4.3–5.1 in); 11–14 g (0.4–0.5 oz); wingspan 16–20 cm (6.3–7.9 in) Habitat: Shrubby, often wet fields and meadows; in winter, weedy fields, marshes and open pine woods Diet: Forages on the ground; mainly insects (including grasshoppers and beetles), berries and seeds	LC Decreasing, but stabilised by the Conservation Reserve Program
Baird's sparrow	Centronyx bairdii (Audubon, 1844)	Breeds in the tall grass prairies of the north central United States and south central Canada; winters in northern Mexico and the southern tip of the United States near Texas	Size: About 12 cm (5 in); 17–21 g (0.60–0.74 oz); wingspan about 23 cm (9 in) Habitat: Tallgrass prairies, mixed grass prairies and moister fescue prairies; woody vegetation and cultivated land generally unsuitable Diet: Feeds on the ground, picking up insects and grass seeds	LC Reduced compared to historic numbers; fluctuates from year to year
