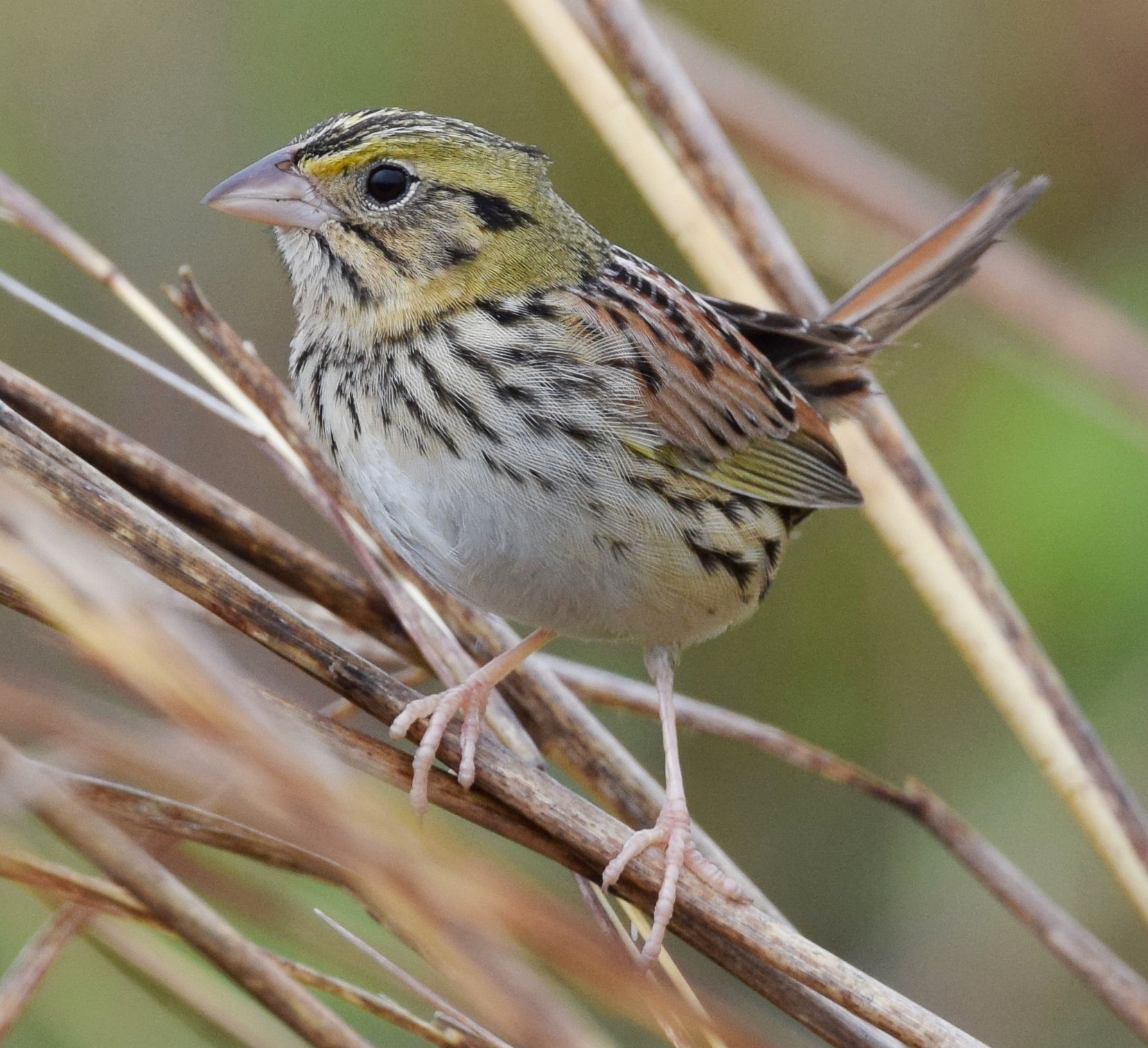

Conservation status
- Least Concern (IUCN 3.1)

Scientific classification
- Kingdom: Animalia
- Phylum: Chordata
- Class: Aves
- Order: Passeriformes
- Family: Passerellidae
- Genus: Centronyx
- Species: C. henslowii

Binomial name
- Centronyx henslowii (Audubon, 1829)

Subspecies
- C. h. henslowii (Audubon, 1829) – western Henslow's sparrow; C. h. susurrans (Brewster, 1918) – eastern Henslow's sparrow
- Breeding Nonbreeding

Synonyms
- Passerherbulus henslowii; Nemospiza henslowii susurrans Brewster, 1918; Ammodramus henslowii

= Henslow's sparrow =

Species of bird

Song

Henslow's sparrow (Centronyx henslowii) is a North American passerine bird in the family Passerellidae. It was named by John James Audubon in honor of John Stevens Henslow. It was originally classified in the genus Emberiza and called Henslow's bunting.

== Description ==
Adults have streaked brown upperparts with a light brown breast with streaks, a white belly and a white throat. They have a pale stripe on the crown with a dark stripe on each side, an olive face and neck, rust-coloured wings and a short dark forked tail.

Measurements:

- Length: 4.3–5.1 in (11–13 cm)
- Weight: 0.4–0.5 oz (11–14 g)
- Wingspan: 6.3–7.9 in (16–20 cm)

== Distribution and habitat ==
Henslow's sparrows breed in fields and meadows across interior eastern North America. Their range stretches from New York and Pennsylvania across the midwest to as far west as Kansas, with a disjunct population in North Carolina, though their populations are scattered and low-density. Historically, Henslow's sparrows were much more widespread and bred as far east as New England. They winter in weedy fields in the American south from Texas and Arkansas east to South Carolina, Georgia, and Florida.

The range and numbers of this bird are decreasing, probably due to habitat loss of the grasslands that it depends on. However, it has heavily benefited from the Conservation Reserve Program formed by the United States Department of Agriculture, which has helped to stabilize its population. Following this, it was downlisted to Least Concern from Near Threatened in 2018.

The Texas population was solely known from a 105-acre (0.42 km^{2}) brushfield near Houston and disappeared after devegetation due to industrial development in the 1980s. It was considered a distinct subspecies (P. h. houstonensis: Arnold, 1983) but is today considered to fall into the range of variation of the nominate subspecies (Browning, 1990). Likewise, the South Dakotan population formerly known as P. h. occidentalis has been synonymized with the nominate. The only remaining subspecies generally (but not universally) accepted are the eastern Henslow's sparrow and the western Henslow's sparrow, whose ranges are for the most part separated by the Appalachian Mountains.

== Diet and behavior ==
These birds forage on the ground, mainly eating insects (including grasshoppers and beetles), berries, and seeds. Their song is a quick se-lick.

== Breeding ==
Their breeding habitat is shrubby fields, often wet, in southern Canada, the northeastern United States, and the midwestern United States. In 2020, the Central Kentucky Audubon Society discovered that a population of Henslow's sparrows near a winery only needed 5 acres of grassy habitat to successfully breed (previous research had suggested at least 20 to 75 acres were necessary). The nest is a well-concealed open cup on or close to the ground in a grassy location; these birds often nest in small colonies. They migrate to marshes and open pine woods in the southeastern United States.
