= Norway, Illinois =

Unincorporated community in Illinois, United States

- Unincorporated community
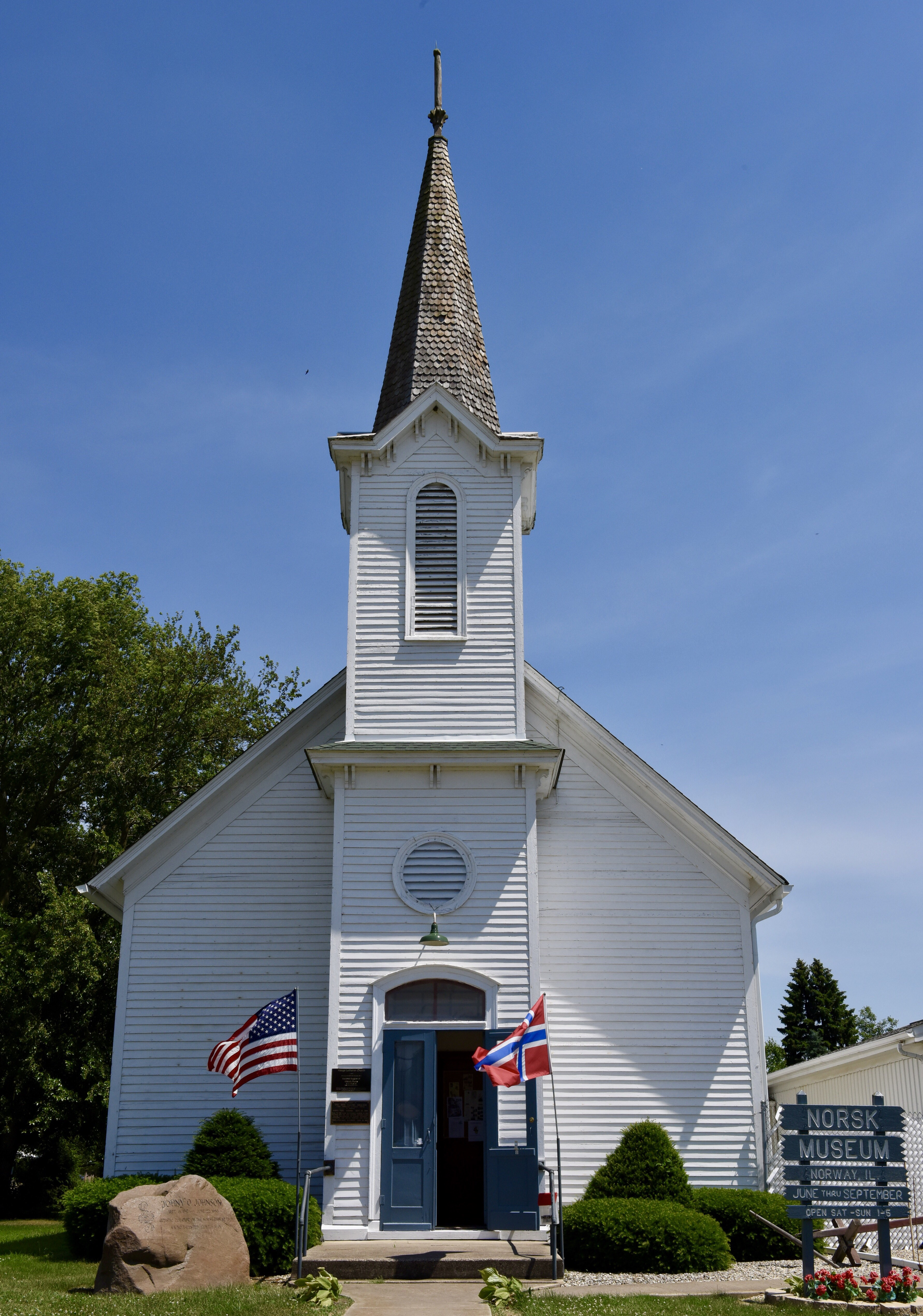
- Hauge Lutheran Church in Norway

- Location in Illinois Location in the United States
- Coordinates: 41°27′56″N 88°39′52″W
- Country: United States
- State: Illinois
- County: LaSalle
- Township: Mission
- Elevation: 640 ft (200 m)
- Time zone: UTC-6 (CST)
  - Summer (DST): UTC-5 (CDT)
- ZIP code: 60551 (Sheridan, Illinois)
- Area codes: 815 & 779

Norway is an unincorporated community in Mission Township, LaSalle County, Illinois. Located along the Fox River, the community was the site of an early Norwegian-American settlement. Today it is the site of the State of Illinois Norwegian Settlers Memorial.

== History ==
Norway received its name from the nearby rural community of settlers from Norway in the area known as the Fox River Settlement. The village was the center of Norwegian immigration dating to 1834. The settlers had in large part relocated from the Kendall Settlement in New York State which had been founded earlier by pioneers who arrived from Norway during 1825 aboard the Restauration. Norwegian-American pioneer leader Cleng Peerson founded this second settlement in the Fox River Valley of Illinois.

Norway does not have a local government, fire district, school district, local policing or postal services. Most local government services are provided by the nearby community of Sheridan. Postal addresses are designated as either being in Sheridan or Serena both of which are no more than six miles away.

== Heritage ==
Norway and the neighboring community of Newark represent the predominating Scandinavian heritage of the far northeast corner of LaSalle County, part of Kendall County, and far southeast corner of DeKalb County. Norway was also an early site of missionary work by Mormons, which laid the groundwork for later Mormon missions in Scandinavia.

Just south of Norway, there is a memorial dedicated to Norwegian immigrants who settled in the area, with a small park, a cemetery, and a plaque from King Olav V. This memorial commemorates the Fox River Settlement, the site of the first permanent Norwegian-American immigrant settlement in the Midwest.

Norsk Museum is located 9 miles northeast of Ottawa, Illinois on highway 71. The museum is located in a former Norwegian Lutheran Church which served as a house of worship from 1848 until 1918. Norsk Museum is dedicated to the Scandinavian settlers who founded the area around Norway, Illinois in the 1800s.

Norway is deeply connected to its past, as most evidently shown at the Norway Store. The store has sat on the same spot for over a century, and the Borchsenius family, which started the store, still continues to own the store, as well as a nursery and a few other pieces of land in the immediate area.

== See also ==
- List of unincorporated communities in Illinois
