= Norwegian Settlers Memorial =

Official memorial in Illinois, US, to honor Norwegian immigrants

Coordinates: 41°27′26.3″N 88°40′25.6″W

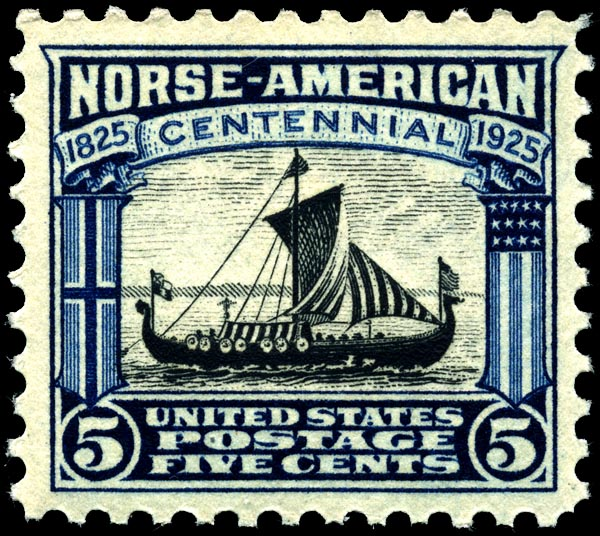
The early 20th century saw several official commemorations of the 100th anniversaries of pioneer Norwegian immigration.

The Norwegian Settlers Memorial is the official memorial of the U.S. state of Illinois maintained in honor of immigrants from the nation of Norway. This Memorial commemorates the Fox River Settlement, the site of the first permanent Norwegian-American immigrant settlement in the Midwest. The Memorial is situated just south of the community of Norway in LaSalle County, Illinois. It is located by the roadside of Illinois Route 71, 9 miles (14 km) northeast of Exit 93 on Interstate 80.

== Description ==
The Memorial celebrates the first arrival in 1834 of a pioneering band of farm-seekers led by the peripatetic ethnic leader Cleng Peerson. Peerson's vessel, the Restauration, is often credited with bringing the first group of immigrants from Norway to Kendall, New York in 1825. Scandinavian farm life had been devastated in 1816 by the Year Without a Summer, and younger sons and daughters from farm families in Norway were looking for new opportunities. During the 1840s, the Fox River Settlement frequently became a stopping-off point for Norwegian immigrants who entered America.

The Memorial was dedicated in 1934 to commemorate the initial arrival in the Fox River Valley of the group led by Cleng Peerson. At the time the Memorial was dedicated, many of the descendants of the Peerson party were still working the land their ancestors had taken up in 1834. Today the Memorial is an un-staffed historic site of the Illinois Historic Preservation Agency.

Three different plaques are located at the Norwegian Settlers Memorial. The plaque dedicated in 1934 commemorates the arrival of the first group of Norwegian-American immigrants. The second and third plaques were dedicated in 1975 to commemorate the 150th Anniversary of Norwegian-American Immigration and to dedicate the adjacent Cleng Peerson Memorial Highway. His Majesty King Olav V of Norway dedicated the Cleng Peerson plaque on October 17, 1975.

== See also ==
- Bishop Hill, Illinois - Pioneer settlement in Northern Illinois by immigrants from Sweden; Peerson moved here after leaving Norway, Illinois
- Cranfills Gap, Texas - Peerson's final American home
- Kendall, New York - Site of a settlement of Norwegian immigrants established by Peerson in 1825
