= Fox River Settlement =

Norwegian-American immigrant settlement

The Fox River Settlement was the first permanent Norwegian-American immigrant settlement in the US Midwest. It was located in La Salle County, Illinois in Mission and Miller Townships, with a part of Rutland Township. Opinions differ as to when they first arrived at the Fox River Settlement, with some writers giving 1835 as the year, Knud Langeland stating it was 1836, and Prof. Rasmus B. Anderson saying that it was 1834.

The Norwegian Settlers Memorial, situated just south of the community of Norway, La Salle County, is the official memorial of Illinois maintained in honor of these immigrants.

== History ==
In the spring of 1834, Jacob Anderson Slogvig, Knud Anderson Slogvig, Gudmund Haugaas, Thorsten Olson Bjaaland, Nels Thompson, Andrew (Endre) Dahl, and Kleng Peerson left for La Salle County; they became the first Norwegian settlers in Illinois. These men selected their land and perfected their purchase as soon as it came into market the following spring. The first two to buy land were Jacob Slogvig and Gudmund Haugaas, whose purchase is recorded under June 15, 1835, the former of 80 acres (32 ha), the latter 160 acres (65 ha), both in that part of what was then called Mission Township, but later came to be Rutland. On June 17, Kleng Peerson's purchase of 80 acres (32 ha) is recorded, as also that of his sister, Carrie Nelson, widow of Cornelius Nelson Hersdal, namely, 80 acres (32 ha) of land bought for her by Peerson. For this date are also recorded the purchases of Thorsten Olson Bjaaland, 80 acres (32 ha), Nels Thompson, 160 acres (65 ha), in what later became Miller Township.

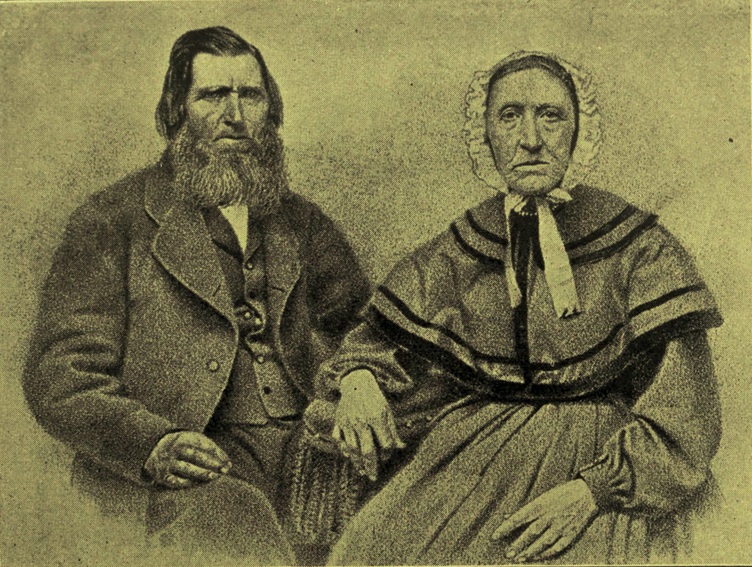
Nils Nilson Hersdal and his wife Bertha

In 1835, Daniel Rossadal and family, Nils Nelson Hersdal, George Johnson, and Carrie Nelson Hersdal with family of seven children moved to La Salle County. Nels Hersdal secured 640 acres (260 ha) in exchange for 100 acres (40 ha) he owned in Orleans County, New York. The "Slooper" (Note: The Norwegians who voyaged to the U.S. aboard the sloop Restauration in 1825 were sometimes referred to as "Sloopers".) Thomas Madland died in 1826; his widow and family of seven also moved to Illinois in 1831. Gjert Hovland came in 1835, and on June 17, purchased 160 acres (65 ha) of land in Miller Township. Nels Hersdal purchased on September 5 Thorsten Bjaaland's 80 acres (32 ha) in the same township; the latter, however, bought 160 acres (65 ha) again on January 16, 1836, in the same locality. (Note: The record of these purchases was copied by Rasmus B. Anderson and printed in his book, First Chapter of Norwegian Immigration (1896) and also in Algot E. Strand's History of the Norwegians of Illinois (1905).)

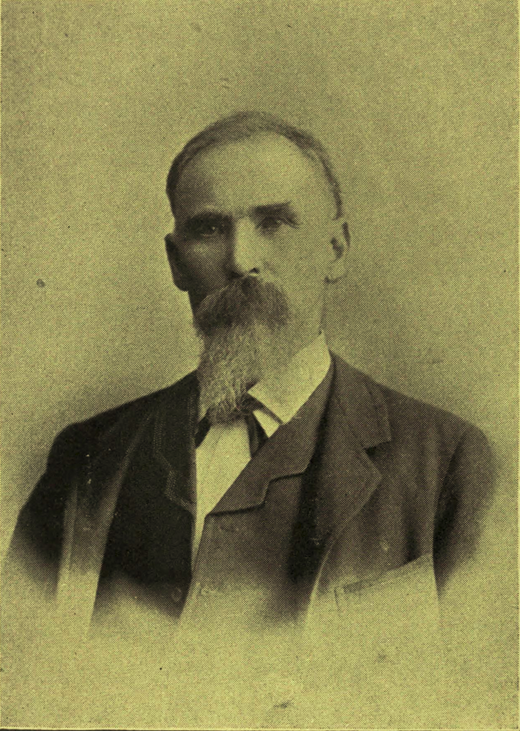
O. Canuteson

Knud Slogvig, who came in 1834, did not buy land but somewhat later returned east and in 1835, went back to Norway. There, he married a sister of the Slooper, Ole Olson Hetletvedt and became largely instrumental in bringing about the emigration of 1836. Elmer Baldwin's History of La Salle County (1877) also states that Oliver Canuteson, Oliver Knutson, Christian Olson, and Ole Olson Hetletvedt came to the county in 1834, but the date is uncertain. With regard to Christian Olson, it appears that he came in 1836 or possibly not till 1837, while also Hetletvedt seems to be dated about two years too early. Among those who came in 1836 are Ole Olson Hetletvedt and Gudmund Sandsberg.

Relative to the founders of the Fox River Settlement, Gudmund Haugaas, one of the two first to record the purchase of land, had married Julia, the daughter of Thomas Madland, in Orleans County, New York in 1827. She died in Rutland Township, in 1846; and he later married Caroline Hervig, a sister of Henrik Hervig (Harwick). He had ten children by his first wife. In Illinois, he joined the Church of Jesus Christ of Latter-day Saints and became an elder in that church, practicing medicine at the same time. He died of cholera on the homestead near Norway, Illinois in July 1849; his widow, Caroline, survived him three years. Jacob Slogvig married Serena, daughter of Thomas Madland, in March 1831. He became one of the founders of the Norwegian settlement in Lee County, Iowa, in 1840, later went to California, where he died in May 1864. The widow lived until about 1897. Some time before her death, she had been living at the home of her son, Andrew J. Anderson, at San Diego, California.

Mrs. Carrie Nelson had seven children, of whom Anne, Nels, Inger, and Martha were born in Norway; Sarah, Peter, and Amelia were born at Kendall, New York. Carrie Nelson died in 1848. The son, Nels Nelson, born 1816, married Catherine Iverson about 1840; he died in Sheridan, Illinois, in August, 1893, as the last male member of the sloop party, being survived by his widow and four of twelve children. The daughter Inger was in 1836 married to John S. Mitchell, of Ottawa, Illinois; Martha married Beach Fallows, a settler of 1835, and Sarah married in 1849 Canute Marsett, an immigrant of 1837, who some years later became a Mormon bishop at Ephraim, Utah. Their oldest son, Peter Cornelius Marsett, born at Salt Lake City, Utah, June 1, 1850, was the first child born of Norwegian parents in Utah. Peter C. Nelson, the youngest son of Carrie Nelson, born 1830, later settled in Larned, Kansas, where he died in 1904. Sara Thompson, oldest daughter of Öien Thompson, and born 1818, married George Olmstead in 1857 in La Salle County; he died in 1849, and in 1855, she married William W. Richey. Mrs. Richey settled in Guthrie Center, Iowa, in 1882. Benson C. Olmsted, Charles B. Olmsted, and Will F. Richey of Guthrie Center, Iowa, were sons of Mrs. Sara Richey. Nels Thompson died in La Salle County, Illinois, in July 1863. Daniel Rossadal and his wife, Bertha, both died in La Salle County in 1854. Nels Nelson Hersdal was born in July 1800, and his wife, Bertha, in May 1804; they were married a few months before the departure of the sloop. He, "Big Nels", as he was called, came to Illinois in 1835, returned to New York and did not bring his family to Illinois until 1846, though he moved west before. He lived until 1886, his wife having died in 1882. Peter Nelson and Ira Nelson of La Salle County, were their sons. George Johnson died from cholera in 1849.

Andrew Dahl went to Utah in the 1850s, being one of the earliest pioneers of that state. A son of his, A. S. Anderson, was a member of the Utah Constitutional Convention of 1895. Ole Hetletvedt, who located at Niagara Falls, New York, not therefore in Orleans County, New York, had three sons, Porter C., Sören L. and James W. The first of these, born 1831, became captain and later colonel in 36th Illinois Infantry Regiment in the American Civil War, and was Acting Brigadier General when he was killed in the Battle of Franklin. Sören Olson was killed in the Battle of Murfreesboro. James Olson, who also went to the front, returned to his home after the war. Porter Olson was buried at Newark, Illinois. Margaret Allen, the "sloop girl" born on the Atlantic, daughter of Lars Larson, married John Atwater in Rochester, New York, in 1857. They afterwards moved to Chicago, where he died in the early 1890s, while Mrs. Atwater lived at Western Springs, Illinois.

The nucleus of the Fox River settlement was about 30 persons, whom came there in 1834–35. The settlement developed rapidly, before many years extending into Kendall, Grundy and DeKalb counties and becoming a distributing point in the westward march of Norwegian immigration during the following years. The settlement in Orleans County, New York, ceased to grow, the objective point of immigrants from Norway had been changed, and the Fox River region received large accessions, especially during the year 1836.

Immigration from Norway, which heretofore had been more or less sporadic, in which individuals and very small groups were found to take part, now entered upon a new phase, beginning to assume the form of organized effort. The year 1836 inaugurated this change, while in 1837, there was something approaching an exodus from certain localities in Western Norway. The desire to emigrate to the U.S. had also now spread far beyond the original center, at Stavanger; the source of emigration was transferred to a more northerly region and with it, the course of settlement in the U.S. was not only directed to Illinois, but also soon extended into the northern border counties of Illinois and into southern and southeastern Wisconsin.

This increased immigration is historically associated with two pioneers in New York, New Jersey, and Illinois: Gjert Hovland and Knud Slogvig. The former of these came to the U.S. in 1831, being probably the first immigrant from Hardanger. He was an early promoter of emigration from southwestern Norway, especially from his own province. He wrote letters home to friends urging emigration and these were circulated far and wide. In one of these letters from Morris County, New Jersey, 1835, he wrote enthusiastically of U.S. laws, and he contrasted its spirit of liberty with the oppression of the class aristocracy in Norway. He advised all who could do so to come to the U.S., where he said it was permitted to settle wherever one chose. Hovland was well known in several parishes in the county of Søndre Bergenhus, and hundreds of copies of his letters were circulated there; they aroused the greatest interest among the people and were no small factor in leading many in that region to emigrate in 1836–37. Thus, in 1836, a lay preacher travelling in Voss, Norway had in his possession one of Gjert Hovland's letters, which letter was read by Nils Röthe, Nils Bolstad and John H. Björgo and others. These three since said that it was the reading of Hovland's letter which induced them to immigrate. Gjert Hovland came to Illinois in 1835. His purchase of 160 acres (65 ha) of land in Miller Township was recorded on June 17, 1835, the same date that the purchases of Kleng Peerson, Nels Thompson and Thorsten Bjaaland were recorded. Gjert Hovland lived there till his death in 1870.

Knud Anderson Slogvig was the chief promoter of immigration in 1836. He had come in the sloop in 1825, and settled in La Salle County in 1834. In 1835, he returned to Skjold, Norway, and there married a sister of Ole O. Hetletvedt, the "Slooper" and one of the early pioneers of La Salle County. While there, people came to talk with him about the U.S. from all parts of southwestern Norway, and a large number in and about Stavanger decided to emigrate. Slogvig's return may have started the "America-fever" in Norway, though it took some years before it reached the central and the eastern parts of the country. It was his intention to return to the U.S. in 1836, and a large party prepared to emigrate with him. In the spring of that year, the two brigs, Norden and Den Norske Klippe, were fitted out from Stavanger. The former sailed on the first Wednesday after Pentecost, arriving in New York City, July 12, 1836. The latter sailed a few weeks later. They carried altogether 200 immigrants, most of whom went directly to La Salle County.
