= Little Ten Conference =

High school sports conference in northern Illinois

- Conference: IHSA
- Founded: 1919
- No. of teams: 11
- Region: Illinois

Locations of Current Little Ten Schools

The Little Ten Conference is the oldest continuous high school athletic conference in the state of Illinois. Founded in 1919, it comprised the following small high schools in northern Illinois: Earlville, Hinckley, Leland, Paw Paw, Plano, Rollo, Sandwich, Shabbona, Somonauk, and Waterman. The conference is still in operation and currently consists of the following members: DePue, Earlville, Hinckley-Big Rock, Indian Creek, Kirkland Hiawatha, LaMoille, Leland, Newark, Serena, Somonauk, and the Illinois Mathematics and Science Academy (IMSA). Over the years, there have been a number of other area schools in the conference, including Malta.

Eight of the original ten schools are still members in some form. Charter members consist of Earlville, Leland, Somonauk, Hinckley (now combined into Hinckley Big Rock), and Paw Paw, Shabbona, Waterman, & Rollo (which have respectively merged to form Indian Creek.)

The Little Ten conference gets reported in many sources with the biggest being the Little 10 Network, on Instagram.

In February 2019, the Little Ten Conference held its 100th league boys basketball tournament.

Schools in the conference compete in 8-Man Football, Competitive Cheer, Competitive Dance, Music, Boys Soccer, Girls Volleyball, Boys and Girls Basketball, Boys Baseball and Girls Softball.

== Current Membership ==
School	Location	County	Mascot	Colors	Joined	Enrollment	IHSA Classes 2/3/4	IHSA Music Class	IHSA Football Class	IHSA Cheer/Dance Class
DePue High School	DePue, Illinois	Bureau	Little Giants; Lady Giants	Blue, Orange	2020	122	A/1A/1A	D	NA	NA
Earlville; High School	Earlville, Illinois	LaSalle	Red Raiders	Red, Black, White	1919; 2006♠	134	A/1A/1A	D	NA	Small Squad
Hinckley-Big Rock High School	Hinckley, Illinois	DeKalb	Royals; Lady Royals	Blue, White	1957	202	A/1A/1A	C	NA	Small squad
Illinois Mathematics and Science Academy	Aurora, Illinois	Kane	Titans	Blue, Silver	2021	836	-	-	-	-
Indian Creek; High School	Shabbona, Illinois	DeKalb	Timberwolves	Red, White, Black	1993♥	211	A/1A/1A	C	NA	NA
Kirkland-Hiawatha; High School	Kirkland, Illinois	DeKalb	Hawks; Lady Hawks	Navy Blue, Gold	2006	167	A/1A/1A	D	8-man	NA
La Moille; High School	La Moille, Illinois	Bureau	Lions; Lady Lions	Red, White	1996	84	A/1A/1A	D	NA	NA
Leland; High School	Leland, Illinois	LaSalle	Panthers; Lady Panthers	Kelly Green, White	1919; 2006♠	79	A/1A/1A	D	NA	NA
Newark; High School	Newark, Illinois	Kendall	Norsemen; Lady Norsemen	Royal Blue, White	1967	165	A/1A/1A	D	NA	NA
Serena; High School♦	Serena, Illinois	LaSalle	Huskers	Purple, Gold	1938♣	225	A/1A/1A	C	NA	NA
Somonauk; High School	Somonauk, Illinois	DeKalb	Bobcats; Lady Bobcats	Blue, Yellow	1919	271	A/1A/1A	C	NA	Small squad

♠ Earlville and Leland combined athletic programs in 2006 becoming Leland-Earlville but separated in 2018
♥ Shabbona and Waterman consolidated to form Indian Creek in 1993.
♦ Harding and Sheridan Schools consolidated with Serena creating the Serena CUSD in 1938.
♣ Harding and Sheridan merged with Serena, creating CUSD2 in 1938.
Sources:IHSA Conferences, IHSA Coop Teams, and IHSA Member Schools Directory

=== Previous members ===
School	Location	County	Mascot	Colors	Joined	Exited	School Still Active	Extra Information
Hinckley; High School	Hinckley, Illinois	DeKalb	Hawks	Blue, Gold	1919	1957	No	Consolidated with Big Rock High School forming Hinckley Big Rock High School
Paw Paw; High School	Paw Paw, Illinois	Lee	Bulldogs	Purple, Gold	1919	2018	Yes	Still a conference member Co-Op in sports with Indian Creek
Malta; High School	Malta, Illinois	DeKalb	Mustangs	Red, White	1967	2000	No	School Closed; Students now attend DeKalb High School
Plano; High School	Plano, Illinois	Kendall	Reapers	Purple, White	1919	1967	Yes	Joined the Northeast Conference
Rollo; High School	Rollo, Illinois	DeKalb	Eagles	Blue, Orange	1919	1954♥	No	Merged with Shabbona in 1954
Sandwich Community; High School	Sandwich, Illinois	DeKalb	Indians; Lady Indians	Black, Orange	1919	1967	Yes	Joined the Northeast Conference
Shabbona; High School	Shabbona, Illinois	DeKalb	Indians	Red, White	1919	1993♥	No	Consolidated with Waterman to form Indian Creek
Sheridan; High School	Sheridan, Illinois	LaSalle	Cardinal	Red, White	1930	1939	No	Consolidated with Harding and Serena
Waterman; High School	Waterman, Illinois	DeKalb	Wolverines	Red, Black	1919	1993♥	No	Consolidated with Shabbona to form Indian Creek

== Junior High Conference ==
The Junior High schools of the respective communities have a conference, comprising

- Earlville
- Leland
- Somonauk
- Indian Creek
- Hinckley Big Rock
- Paw Paw
- Newark
- Lisbon
- Serena

== High School Conference Members, Past and Present ==
- IMSA (2021-)
- DePue (2020-)
- Earlville (1919–2006, 2018-)*
- Leland (1919–2006, 2018-)*
- Paw Paw (1919-2018, Co-op in sports with Indian Creek)*
- Malta (1967–2000, school was closed, students now attend DeKalb High School)
- Kirkland Hiawatha (2006-)
- Plano (1919–1967, Joined Northeast Conference, then Interstate Eight Conference in 1979-80 with Sandwich)*
- Sandwich (1919–1967, Joined Northeast Conference, then Interstate Eight Conference in 1979-80 with Plano)*
- Serena (1938-, formed out of merger with Harding and Sheridan schools)
- Hinckley (1919–1957)*
- Hinckley-Big Rock (1957-2019, school district merged with Big Rock)
- Hinckley Big Rock (2019-, school district removed the dash from its name)
- Shabbona (1919–1993)*
- Waterman (1919–1993)*
- Indian Creek (1993-, Shabbona/Waterman school districts merged)
- Newark (1967-)
- LaMoille-Ohio (1996-)
- Somonauk (1919-)*
- Sheridan (1930–1939), school closed and district merged with Serena; Elementary school still open, but part of a different conference.)
- Rollo (1919–1954), school closed and district merged with Shabbona, and became part of Indian Creek)*

* Original conference members

== Mascots and Colors ==
The schools are represented by the following team nicknames:

- Big Rock - Bobcats - blue & gold
- DePue - Little Giants - blue & orange
- Earlville - Raiders - red, black, & white
- Hinckley - Hawks - blue and gold
- Hinckley-Big Rock - Royals - blue & white
- IMSA - Titans - columbia blue & silver
- Indian Creek - Timberwolves - red, black, & white
- Kirkland Hiawatha - Hawks - navy & gold
- LaMoille - Lions - red and white
- Leland - Panthers - kelly green & black
- Malta - Mustangs - red and white
- Newark - Norsemen - Royal Blue & White
- Paw Paw - Bulldogs - purple & yellow
- Plano - Reapers - purple & white
- Rollo - Eagles - blue and orange
- Serena - Huskers - purple and gold
- Shabbona - Indians - red & white
- Sheridan - Cardinals - red & white
- Somonauk - Bobcats - blue & yellow
- Waterman - Wolverines - red & black

== Boys Basketball Tournament and Regular Season Championships ==
Year	Winning team	Score	Losing team	Score	Location	Regular Season Champ
2026	Indian Creek	40	IMSA	29	Somonauk	
2025	Hinckley-Big Rock	47	Indian Creek	44	Somonauk	Newark, Hinckley-Big Rock
2024	Serena	51	Earlville	27	Somonauk	Serena
2023	Serena	54	Hinckley-Big Rock	46	Somonauk	Serena
2022	Somonauk	55	Newark	49	Somonauk	Somonauk
2021	Indian Creek	83	Somonauk	73	Shabbona	Indian Creek
2020	Indian Creek	62	Newark	33	Somonauk	Indian Creek
2019	Newark	55	Indian Creek	44	Somonauk	Newark
2018	Newark	71	Indian Creek	49	Somonauk	Newark
2017	Newark	80	Indian Creek	73 (2-OT)	Somonauk	Newark
2016	Newark	63	Indian Creek	50	Somonauk	Newark
2015	Newark	58	Hinckley-Big Rock	45	Somonauk	Somonauk
2014	Somonauk	64	Newark	57	Somonauk	Newark
2013	Hinckley-Big Rock	39	Indian Creek	30	Somonauk	Hinckley-Big Rock, Paw Paw
2012	Hinckley-Big Rock	58	Somonauk	39	Somonauk	Hinckley-Big Rock
2011	Newark	62	Indian Creek	57	Somonauk	Newark
2010	Newark	66	Serena	43	Somonauk	Newark
2009	Somonauk	61	Newark	52	Somonauk	Hinckley-Big Rock, Somonauk, Newark
2008	Somonauk	62	Hinckley-Big Rock	48	Somonauk	Somonauk, Newark
2007	Serena	73	Somonauk	58	Somonauk	Hinckley-Big Rock
2006	Serena	56	Indian Creek	42	Somonauk	Serena
2005	Serena	55	Somonauk	49	Somonauk	Newark
2004	Newark	62	Hinckley-Big Rock	46	Somonauk	Newark
2003	Somonauk	67	Hinckley-Big Rock	52	Somonauk	Somonauk
2002	Newark	63	Hinckley-Big Rock	61 (OT)	Somonauk	Hinckley-Big Rock, Newark, Somonauk
2001	Hinckley-Big Rock	45	Serena	30	Somonauk	Hinckley-Big Rock
2000	Serena	62	Hinckley-Big Rock	43	Somonauk	Hinckley-Big Rock, Indian Creek
1999	Malta	76	Somonauk	47	Somonauk	Malta
1998	Paw Paw	69	Indian Creek	54	Somonauk	Paw Paw
1997	Paw Paw	47	Hinckley-Big Rock	43	Somonauk	Earlville, Hinckley-Big Rock, Paw Paw, Indian Creek
1996	Hinckley-Big Rock	54	Indian Creek	43	Somonauk	Somonauk, Indian Creek
1995	Newark	52	Hinckley-Big Rock	51	Somonauk	Hinckley-Big Rock, Newark
1994	Newark	56	Hinckley-Big Rock	50	Somonauk	Newark
1993	Newark	77	Hinckley-Big Rock	61	Somonauk	Newark
1992	Somonauk	67	Newark	59	Somonauk	Somonauk
1991	Shabbona	57	Somonauk	47	Somonauk	Shabbona
1990	Somonauk	62	Shabbona	48	Somonauk	Shabbona, Somonauk
1989	Leland	75	Malta	58	Somonauk	Somonauk
1988	Newark	59	Shabbona	53	Somonauk	Shabbona
1987	Newark	70	Shabbona	47	Somonauk	Newark
1986	Newark	86	Shabbona	60	Somonauk	Newark
1985	Newark	78	Earlville	46	Somonauk	Newark
1984	Hinckley-Big Rock	67	Newark	56	Somonauk	Hinckley-Big Rock
1983	Newark	71	Paw Paw	56	Hinckley	Newark
1982	Newark	67	Serena	56	Somonauk	Newark
1981	Serena	58	Newark	52	Somonauk	Serena
1980	Serena	53	Shabbona	50	Shabbona	Shabbona
1979	Shabbona	61	Leland	55	Hinckley	Somonauk
1978	Newark	58	Serena	56 (OT)	Waterman	Leland
1977	Serena	63	Somonauk	56	Somonauk	Serena
1976	Hinckley-Big Rock	63	Serena	60	Shabbona	Serena
1975	Shabbona	70	Serena	66	Hinckley	Serena
1974	Somonauk	52	Newark	44	Waterman	Somonauk
1973	Somonauk	47	Serena	42	Somonauk	Shabbona
1972	Shabbona	55	Waterman	41	Shabbona	Shabbona
1971	Newark	48	Waterman	47	Hinckley	Waterman
1970	Waterman	75	Shabbona	52	Waterman	Shabbona, Malta
1969	Newark	43	Shabbona	34	Shabbona	Shabbona
1968	Newark	64	Shabbona	49	Hinckley	Shabbona
1967	Hinckley-Big Rock	65	Waterman	61	Waterman	Hinckley-Big Rock
1966	Serena	52	Earlville	42	Plano	Serena, Paw Paw
1965	Serena	60	Shabbona	56	Shabbona	Serena
1964	Serena	88	Leland	64	Hickley	Serena, Plano, Shabbona
1963	Serena	49	Leland	48	Waterman	Leland
1962	Shabbona	73	Plano	57	Plano	Shabbona
1961	Serena	51	Hinckley-Big Rock	49 (2-OT)	Serena	Waterman
1960	Shabbona	79	Serena	70	Shabbona	Shabbona
1959	Shabbona	91	Leland	51	Hinckley	Shabbona
1958	Shabbona	77	Sandwich	55	Earlville	Shabbona
1957	Serena	55	Earlville	48	Serena	Shabbona, Leland
1956	Earlville	62	Somonauk	50	Leland	Earlville
1955	Earlville	58	Somonauk	56	Shabbona	Earlville
1954	Waterman	64	Paw Paw	56	Earlville	Waterman
1953	Serena	58	Waterman	53	Serena	Waterman
1952	Hinckley	47	Somonauk	43	Hinckley	Hinckley, Somonauk
1951	Serena	58	Hinckley	57 (OT)	Leland	Hinckley
1950	Serena	56	Leland	41	Earlville	Serena
1949	Waterman	57	Plano	41	Waterman	Plano, Waterman
1948	Waterman	39	Serena	35	Somonauk	Waterman
1947	Plano	31	Somonauk	30	Serena	Serena
1946	Plano	38	Paw Paw	33	Sandwich	Somonauk, Waterman
1945	Somonauk	54	Waterman	42	Plano	Somonauk
1944	Shabbona	35	Serena	29	Hinckley	Shabbona
1943	Somonauk	45	Leland	29	Waterman	Somonauk
1942	Somonauk	31	Shabbona	21	Somonauk	Waterman
1941	Waterman	38	Earlville	16	Serena	Earlville
1940	Waterman	61	Earlville	28	Sandwich	Serena
1939	Waterman	25	Plano	23 (OT)	Plano	Waterman
1938	Earlville	25	Sandwich	18	Hinckley	Earlville
1937	Waterman	24	Leland	22 (2-OT)	Somonauk	Sandwich
1936	Shabbona	25	Leland	17	Waterman	Leland
1935	Waterman	34	Leland	17	Sandwich	Waterman
1934	Waterman	48	Leland	19	Plano	Waterman
1933	Waterman	36	Paw Paw	18	Hinckley	Waterman
1932	Waterman	27	Earlville	13	Waterman	Waterman
1931	Waterman	29	Sheridan	14	Waterman	Waterman
1930	Waterman	20	Hinckley	1	Plano	Waterman
1929	Waterman	29	Rollo	20	Hinckley	Waterman
1928	Leland	30	Hinckley	19	Sandwich	Leland
1927	Hinckley	25	Waterman	20	Sandwich	Earlville, Sandwich
1926	Earlville	32	Hinckley	11	Sandwich	Hinckley
1925	Hinckley	29	Sandwich	19	Waterman	Earlville
1924	Sandwich	19	Hinckley	17	Sandwich	Hinckley
1923	Earlville	33	Rollo	27	Sandwich	Earlville
1922	Earlville	32	Leland	24	Earlville	Earlville
1921	Earlville	12	Leland	11	Leland	Earlville
1920	Sandwich	16	Rollo	9	Sandwich	Leland

-+

== Girls Basketball Championships ==
Year	Winning team	Score	Losing team	Score	Regular Season Champ
2026	Serena	43	Indian Creek	22	
2025	Serena	50	Hinckley-Big Rock	41	Serena
2024	Serena	47	Newark	32	Serena
2023	Serena	38	Newark	30	Serena
2022	Serena	56	Somonauk	23	Serena
2021	Newark	52	Somonauk	34	Serena
2020	Newark	55	Indian Creek	45	Newark, Serena
2019	Newark	55	Serena	24	Newark
2018	Serena	48	Newark	45	Newark
2017	Serena	39	Newark	21	Newark
2016	Indian Creek	52	Serena	49	Indian Creek
2015	Indian Creek	36	Newark	32	Newark
2014	Serena	47	Newark	46	Newark
2013	Newark	56	Serena	30	Newark
2012	Newark	37	Serena	23	Hinckley-Big Rock, Newark
2011	Hinckley-Big Rock	41	Newark	31	Hinckley-Big Rock
2010	Hinckley-Big Rock	63	Newark	39	Hinckley-Big Rock
2009	Hinckley-Big Rock	51	Newark	45	Newark
2008	Hinckley-Big Rock	50	Newark	34	Hinckley-Big Rock, Earlville-Leland
2007	Hinckley-Big Rock	50	Newark	38	Hinckley-Big Rock
2006	Newark	38	Somonauk	32 (OT)	Earlville-Leland
2005	Serena	49	Newark	36	Hinckley-Big Rock
2004	Newark	64	Indian Creek	39	Newark
2003	Newark	60	Serena	46	Newark
2002	Hinckley-Big Rock	48	Serena	47	LaMoille, Newark
2001	Hinckley-Big Rock	58	Earlville-Leland	30	Hinckley-Big Rock, Newark
2000	Hinckley-Big Rock	67	Serena	50	Serena
1999	Newark	51	Earlville-Leland	32	Newark, Somonauk, Earlville-Leland
1998	Hinckley-Big Rock	46	Leland	42	Hinckley-Big Rock
1997	Hinckley-Big Rock	62	Serena	53	Hinckley-Big Rock
1996	Hinckley-Big Rock	61	Serena	55	Hinckley-Big Rock
1995	Somonauk	61	Serena	46	Serena
1994	Somonauk	58	Indian Creek	49	Somonauk
1993	Hinckley-Big Rock	61	Leland	38	Hinckley-Big Rock
1992	Leland	57	Hinckley-Big Rock	31	Leland
1991	Leland	56	Shabbona	36	Leland
1990	Leland	65	Shabbona	29	Leland
1989	Hinckley-Big Rock	65	Leland	51	Hinckley-Big Rock
1988	Leland	64	Shabbona	39	Shabbona
1987	Shabbona	53	Hinckley-Big Rock	49	Shabbona
1986	Shabbona	51	Hinckley-Big Rock	48	Shabbona
1985	Shabbona	40	Leland	38	Shabbona
1984	Hinckley-Big Rock	47	Somonauk	40	Hinckley-Big Rock
1983	Hinckley-Big Rock	62	Somonauk	42	Hinckley-Big Rock
1982	Hinckley-Big Rock	44	Waterman	21	Hinckley-Big Rock
