= Hauge Lutheran Church =

Hauge Lutheran Church may refer to:

- The Hauge Synod of the Lutheran church
- Hauge Lutheran Church (Goodhue County, Minnesota)
- Hauge Lutheran Church (Norway, Illinois)
- Hauge Log Church, a Lutheran church in Daleyville, Wisconsin
