= Koshkonong Settlement =

Norwegian-American immigrant settlement

Koshkonong Settlement (Norwegian: Kaskeland) was a pioneer settlement located in Wisconsin's eastern Dane and western Jefferson counties. It took its name from Koshkonong Lake, and particularly from Koshkonong Creek.

The first Norwegians located in the settlement in the spring and summer of 1840. The following year, Norwegian settlers from the Jefferson Prairie Settlement and the Fox River Settlement arrived. By 1850, more than half of Wisconsin's Norwegian population of 5,000 lived in the Koshkonong Settlement, which served for a time as the largest Norwegian-American community in the U.S. It was the sixth Norwegian settlement in the U.S. and the third to be founded in Wisconsin. It not only became large and prosperous, but it also became the most widely known as well as the wealthiest rural Norwegian settlement in the U.S.

== Geography ==
The townships in Dane County in which the Norwegians settled most extensively were found in three groups, viz.: in the southeastern, in the northern, and in the southwestern part of the county. The first of these comprised originally Albion, Christiana, and Deerfield; from this region the settlement soon grew into Dunkirk and Pleasant Springs, and from the latter north into Cottage Grove, (Note: Later Norwegians settled also in Blooming Grove (west of Cottage Grove) and in Rutland (west of Dunkirk), but they always remained here a minority of the population. On the north, the settlement extends also into southeastern Sun Prairie and southwestern Medina.) On the east it extended into Sumner and Oakland townships in Jefferson County. This settlement came to be known as Koshkonong Prairie, though properly the name applies only to the two first-named towns and adjacent portions of Pleasant Spring and Deerfield.

The second settlement included the townships of Burke, eastern Westport, Vienna, Windsor, and northwestern and central Bristol. The western portion of this settlement is generally known by the name of the Norway (or Norwegian) Grove Settlement, from the post office of that name in Vienna Township around which it lay. In its northern extremity, the settlement extended into Columbia County, northeast into Spring Prairie and Bonnet Prairie and northwest past the village of Lodi. This whole region was in reality a northern extension of the Koshkonong Settlement. (Note: But Spring Prairie was settled slightly earlier than Norway Grove.) It was also from four to eight years later in order of formation. (Note: The settlement enters the Town of Dane (northwestern part) on the west.)

The third group of townships consisted of Primrose, Perry, Springdale, Blue Mounds, and that part of Verona Township which lay east of Blue Mound Creek. (Note: That is, excluding the southwestern part of the town and sections 6, 7, and 18 along its western line.)

== History ==
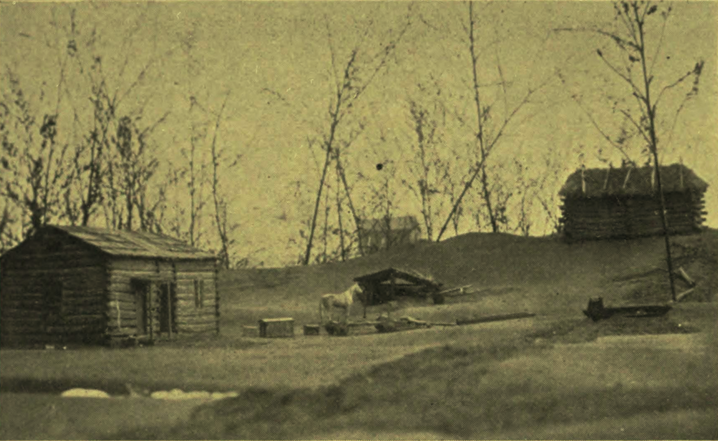
Gunnul Olson Vindeg house was built in Christiana, Dane County, Wisconsin, in 1840

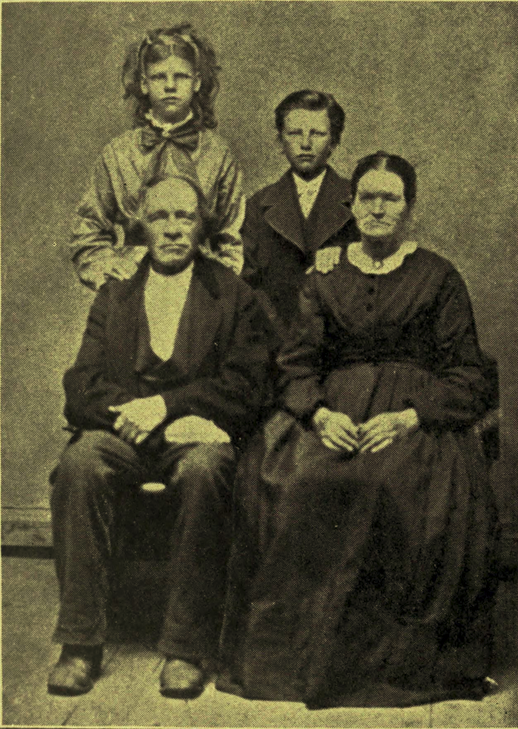
Nels Siverson Gilderhus and wife

The genesis of the settlement of Koshkonong Prairie (Note: In reality, a group of prairies.) in Dane County, Wisconsin, dates from spring and summer 1840. Those who located there that year were Gunnul Olson Vindeg, Björn Anderson Kvelve (Rasmus B. Anderson's father), Amund Anderson Hornefjeld, Thorstein Olson Bjaadland (one of the sloopers), Lars Olson Dugstad, Nels Siverson Gilderhus, Nels Larson Bolstad and Anders Finno. Nels Siverson Gilderhus, Nels Larson Bolstad and a third person, who did not settle there, visited the towns of Christiana and Deerfield somewhat late in the fall of 1839. A few "first settlers" preceded the Norwegians.

In Albion, the Norwegians were the earliest settlers, for some of them came as early as the spring of 1841. The first pioneer settler in the town of Christiana was William M. Mayhew who came in 1837, and located on section twenty-eight. The next arrivals were Norwegians. The first settler in Pleasant Spring seems to have been Abel Rasdall, who located his cabin on the eastern shore of Lake Kegonsa, about 0.5 miles (0.80 km) south of the inlet; the year of his arrival, however, may or may not have preceded Knut H. Roe. In Deerfield, the first settlement was made by Norwegians in 1840.

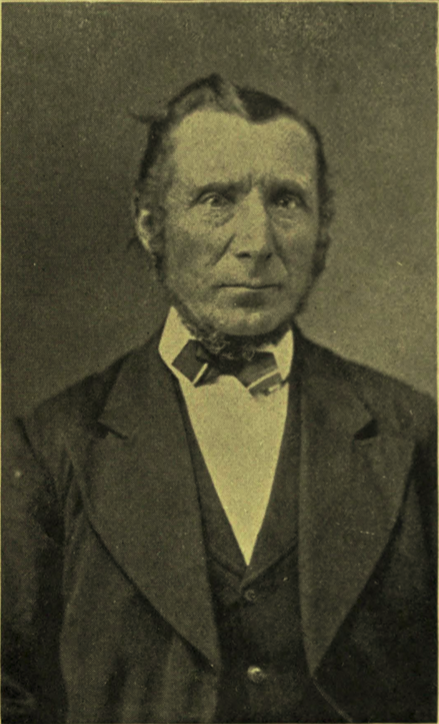
John Nelson Luraas

The first settlers in the town of Rutland were Joseph Dejean, John Prentice, and Dan Pond, who located in its southern part in 1842. John Nelson Luraas may have been the first settler in Dunkirk; he came in 1843, and was followed soon after by John Wheeler, (Note: From whom Wheeler Prairie takes its name. I am inclined to think that Wheeler preceded Luraas (see below).) Chauncey Isham, and Mitchel Campbell. In the towns of Cottage Grove, Burke, Windsor, and Bristol, other pioneers preceded Norwegians by several years, as also in Blue Mounds, where Ebenezer Brigham located as early as 1828, or some 16 years before that part of the county actually became settled.

Springdale was settled first in 1844, when John Harlow entered it, he remaining the only European man there for a year. A few Americans came in 1845, then Americans and Norwegian immigrants in 1846. An American settlement was effected by Thomas Lindsay and David Robertson in the town of Bristol (section seven) two years before Norwegians came there, which was in 1847. The earliest settler, however, seems to be William G. Simons who entered in 1838. The first European settler in Perry Township was John Brown of Indiana, who came into the town in 1846. A few other Americans (as B. K. Berry in 1847) preceded the Norwegians, whose coming dates from 1848. In the town of Primrose, Robert Spears and family were the first comers (1844); a few other Americans had also arrived there before Christian Hendrickson located in the town in 1846.

== Immigration ==
=== From Voss ===
Most of the immigrants from Voss, Norway, who came in 1839, located either in Chicago or in La Salle County, Illinois. Not all of those who went to the Fox River Settlement region located there permanently. The land there was mostly taken, and the Norwegians from Voss did not like the prairie; they were in search of a location where timber and water was near at hand, so some of them decided to locate in Wisconsin, where they had heard there was plenty of forest land with many lakes and rivers. The party from Voss had been in La Salle County, Illinois only a few weeks, when three of them decided to go and investigate for themselves. These three were Nils Bolstad, Nils Gilderhus, and Magne Bystölen. They engaged Odd J. Himle (who had emigrated from Voss in 1837), then living in Illinois, to accompany them as their guide and interpreter. Bystölen, being taken sick and thus prevented from going, gave instructions to the rest to select land for him if the region was satisfactory to the rest. Bolstad, Gilderhus, and Himle started on foot for Milwaukee, a distance of a 150 miles (240 km). Having arrived there in safety, they procured maps and whatever information they could with reference to the regions that were open to settlement in the interior of the state. Then they walked west about 80 miles (130 km) inspecting the land on the way, and after two weeks, reached the eastern part of Dane County. The spot where they stopped was about 2 miles (3.2 km) east of the site of the present village of Cambridge. Here a man by the name of Snell had shortly before established a tavern for trappers and frontiersmen; with him, the Voss party of homeseekers put up, and from him they received instructions as to the "government markings" of the sections and the stakes placed at the corner of sections and quarter sections, giving the number of each. They then traveled westward to Koshkonong Prairie. (Note: The prairie takes its name from Koshkonong Creek and Koshkonong Lake.) Himle, Gilderhus and Bolstad inspected the whole prairie from one end to the other. After returning to Cambridge, they finally decided on a parcel of land a little over 2 miles (3.2 km) northwest of that place, lying on both sides of the boundary line between the towns of Christiana and Deerfield. Here Gilderhus and Bolstad selected 40 acres (16 ha) each, and 40 acres (16 ha) for Bystölen. This locality was chosen because of its abundance of hardwood timber, the hay on the marshes, and good fishing in Koshkonong Creek nearby.

Gilderhus, Bolstad, and Himle returned to Illinois by way of Milwaukee, remaining in La Salle County through the winter. Their account of the land of promise which they had discovered, aroused much interest, and brought others later. Early in the spring of 1840, Gilderhus and Bolstad, accompanied by Magne Bystölen and Andrew Finno, started for Koshkonong in wagons drawn by oxen. They arrived at the end of April and immediately took possession of the land selected. The land that had been chosen for Bystölen was inside the Christiana Township line, where Anders Finno also located. Nils Gilderhus's land lay within Deerfield Township; he was the first Norwegian to locate there. He built a log cabin, which was the first house in the town. Nils Gilderhus and Nils Bolstad soon after walked to Milwaukee and filed their claims at the government land office, Nils Gilderhus being the first in the party to purchase land. The date of the purchase was May 6, 1840; the land was the south half of the southwest quarter of section thirty-five. Nils Bolstad entered on 40 acres (16 ha) of section two in the town of Christiana, and Magne Bystölen's 40 acres (16 ha) lay directly east of Bolstad's in the same section. (Note: Their names are recorded in the land office as Nils Seaverson, Nils Larson and Magany Buttelson.) Their first habitation was a hurriedly built log cabin. This was replaced by a dug out cellar against an embankment where they lived during the remainder of the cold season. In this dugout, Nils Gilderhus and Magne Bystölen continued to live another year, but Nils Bolstad erected a log cabin in 1841, when he married Anna Vindeig, who was the first European woman in the locality. Gilderhus erected a cabin in Deerfield near the Christiana line in 1842, but he sold out in 1843 to Gulleik Thompson Saue. Andrew Fenno and Odd Himle did not purchase land. (Note: Himle settled some years later at Norway Grove, Dane County.)

=== From Numedal ===
Among the immigrants who came from Rollaug, Numedal, in 1839, was Gunnul Olson Vindeig, though he did not come in Nattestad's party. Coming later in the year, he went via Chicago, directly to Jefferson Prairie, where he remained during the winter. In the early spring of 1840, about the time the Vossings were moving north to locate on their claims, Vindeig and Gjermund Knudson Sunde rowed a boat from Beloit northward along the Rock River, up Koshkonong Lake and Koshkonong Creek, into the town of Christiana. Vindeig, with his wife, Guri, and two sisters, moved from Jefferson Prairie via Milton, to Koshkonong, driving in a covered wagon, and proceeded to take possession of the land he had selected. He soon erected a cottage. The land which Vindeig located on is the south half of the northwest quarter of section thirty-four. There he lived until he died in October 1846. Sunde selected 40 acres (16 ha) of land directly north of Vindeig's home, which he later sold to Ole Lier. Vindeig's land purchase was recorded on May 22, 1840, a few days after the purchase by Gilderhus and Bolstad was recorded.

=== From Stavanger ===
The third group of settlers, most of them immigrants from Stavanger, were living in La Salle County, Illinois. These four men were Thorsten Olson Bjaaland, Amund Anderson Hornefjeld, Björn Anderson Kvelve, and Lars Olson Dugstad. Bjaaland had come in the sloop in 1825; he was the only slooper who came to Wisconsin. Hornefjeld was also from the province of Stavanger, being born on Moster Island in 1806. He came to the U.S. in 1836, and settled in La Salle County, where he lived for four years. Kvelve also arrived in the U.S. in 1836; he lived mostly in Chicago and La Salle County. He had come from Vikedal Parish in Ryfylke. Three other men, Erick Johanneson Savik, Lars Scheie, and Amund Anderson Rossaland, intimate friends of Kvelve, were of the party, but these did not settle on Koshkonong. In the spring of 1840, these seven men decided to go north in search of homesteads. From Gilderhus and Bolstad they had received information of Koshkonong and they decided also to go there and inspect the locality. After reaching the southern line of Dane County, they stopped in Albion, near Koshkonong Creek. Here they found country that suited them. The Stavangerings, as the Vossings, looked for wood and water, and in this region, the party selected land. Amund Hornefjeld chose the east half of the southeast quarter of section one, and Björn Kvelve, the west half of the same quarter section.

Bjaaland chose 80 acres (32 ha) immediately north of Kvelve's, while Dugstad took the east half of the southwest quarter of section one. Rossaland selected a piece of land near that of Kvelve, but he was later informed that it had already been taken, so Rossaland went to Jefferson Prairie, as did also Scheie. The whole party then returned to La Salle County, Illinois, and did not move to Albion Township and take possession of their land before the spring of 1841. Savik became ill upon their return to La Salle County where he died in June 1840. Savik and wife, Ingeborg, had emigrated from Kvindherred in 1836, locating in Rochester, New York before removing he following year to La Salle County. Early in the spring, Kvelve and Bjaaland moved to Koshkonong with their families. Dugstad came north from La Salle County about the same time as Kvelve and Bjaaland. Amund Hornefjeld married Ingeborg Johnson, widow of Erik Savik, in La Salle County, in June 1841, and they came north to Albion a few weeks later.

== See also ==
- Koshkonong, Wisconsin
