= Lake Holiday, Illinois =

- Census-designated place
- Location within Illinois Location within the United States
- Coordinates: 41°36′57″N 88°40′06″W
- Country: United States
- State: Illinois
- County: LaSalle
- Township: Northville
- Established: July 2, 1965

Area
  - Total: 3.99 sq mi (10.33 km^{2})
  - Land: 3.51 sq mi (9.08 km^{2})
  - Water: 0.48 sq mi (1.25 km^{2})
- Elevation: 656 ft (200 m)

Population (2020)
  - Total: 5,687
  - Density: 1,622.7/sq mi (626.54/km^{2})
- Time zone: UTC-6 (Central (CST))
  - Summer (DST): UTC-5 (CDT)
- ZIP code(s): 60528, 60548, 60552
- Area codes: 815 & 779
- GNIS feature ID: 2629851
- Website: www.lakeholiday.us

Lake Holiday is a census-designated place located on Lake Holiday in Northville Township, LaSalle County, Illinois, United States. Its population was 5,687 as of the 2020 census.

The homes on the western banks of the lake are served by the Somonauk Fire Department/EMS and the Somonauk School District, while the eastern banks of the lake are covered by Sandwich municipal services (Fire/EMS, CUSD 430). However, due to the community's location south of the LaSalle-DeKalb county line, neither Sandwich Police nor Somonauk Police have any jurisdiction. Instead, the area is patrolled by local security, which has limited authority. For serious matters, the community is covered by the LaSalle County Sheriff's Department, which has a substation in the Northville Township Building, a few miles to the south of Lake Holiday.

The Lake Holiday CDP includes the neighborhoods surrounding Lake Holiday as well as neighboring Wildwood, which sits to the east of County Highway 3. Lake Holiday was created in the mid-1960s as a lake resort community, with its property owners association being incorporated on July 2, 1965. Wildwood was created around the same time, as a modular home community just across the highway. Starting in the early 1990s, an annex to Wildwood known as "Wildwood South" or "New Wildwood" was created, with completion around 2002. Both subdivisions share a gas station and a small retail area, with a restaurant having been built in 2006-2007 farther north, just south of the county line.

Lake Holiday was created by damming up Somonauk Creek in 1965, on its path south toward its confluence with the Fox River just north of Sheridan.

== Geography ==
According to the 2021 census gazetteer files, Lake Holiday has a total area of 3.99 square miles (10.33 km^{2}), of which 3.51 square miles (9.09 km^{2}) (or 87.89%) is land and 0.48 square miles (1.24 km^{2}) (or 12.11%) is water.

== Demographics ==
Historical population
Census	Pop.	Note	%±
2020	5,687		—
U.S. Decennial Census

=== 2020 census ===
As of the 2020 census, Lake Holiday had a population of 5,687. There were 2,229 households and 1,572 families in the CDP. The median age was 44.3 years. 20.4% of residents were under the age of 18 and 19.6% of residents were 65 years of age or older. For every 100 females there were 100.2 males, and for every 100 females age 18 and over there were 98.8 males age 18 and over.

100.0% of residents lived in urban areas, while 0.0% lived in rural areas.

There were 2,229 households in Lake Holiday, of which 26.2% had children under the age of 18 living in them. Of all households, 59.6% were married-couple households, 15.3% were households with a male householder and no spouse or partner present, and 18.6% were households with a female householder and no spouse or partner present. About 22.8% of all households were made up of individuals and 11.8% had someone living alone who was 65 years of age or older.

There were 2,496 housing units, of which 10.7% were vacant. The homeowner vacancy rate was 1.8% and the rental vacancy rate was 6.9%.

Racial composition as of the 2020 census
Race	Number	Percent
White	5,109	89.8%
Black or African American	39	0.7%
American Indian and Alaska Native	14	0.2%
Asian	19	0.3%
Native Hawaiian and Other Pacific Islander	0	0.0%
Some other race	98	1.7%
Two or more races	408	7.2%
Hispanic or Latino (of any race)	386	6.8%

=== Income and poverty ===
The median income for a household in the CDP was $82,195, and the median income for a family was $92,009. Males had a median income of $58,903 versus $39,142 for females. The per capita income for the CDP was $32,534. About 4.5% of families and 6.9% of the population were below the poverty line, including 14.3% of those under age 18 and 0.9% of those age 65 or over.
