= Northville Township =

Northville Township may refer to:

- Northville Township, LaSalle County, Illinois
- Northville Township, Michigan
- Northville Township, Spink County, South Dakota, in Spink County, South Dakota
