= Mission Township, LaSalle County, Illinois =

Coordinates: 41°30′31″N 88°38′50″W

Mission Township
- Township
- Location in LaSalle County

- LaSalle County's location in Illinois
- Country: United States
- State: Illinois
- County: LaSalle
- Established: November 6, 1849

Area
  - Total: 32.11 sq mi (83.2 km^{2})
  - Land: 31.68 sq mi (82.1 km^{2})
  - Water: 0.42 sq mi (1.1 km^{2}) 1.32%

Population (2020)
  - Total: 4,019
  - Density: 126.9/sq mi (48.98/km^{2})
- Time zone: UTC-6 (CST)
  - Summer (DST): UTC-5 (CDT)
- FIPS code: 17-099-49646

Mission Township is located in LaSalle County, Illinois. As of the 2020 census, its population was 4,019 and it contained 1,068 housing units.

== History ==
Mission Township takes its name from Mission Creek, which flows through it. The creek's name came in turn from a mission to the Potawatomi that the Methodist Episcopal missionary Jesse Walker established in 1826 near the creek's headwaters. The mission was burned by Sauk forces in 1832, at the time of the Black Hawk War. The United Methodist Church in Sheridan, which is the seat of the township, has a memorial to Walker.

== Geography ==
The township is shares its western boundary with Serena Township, and its northern boundary with Northville Township. The township border is defined by where the Fox River goes southwest, turns south, then continues to go east, south, west, northwest, north, and then it then curves to go southwest again, forming an awkward "S" shape on the map.

The community of Sheridan resides at the beginning of the bends in the river, and the community of Norway resides where the river flows north, and then curves around to flow southwest. Millington resides along the river, northeast of Sheridan. The community of Newark resides along the county line within Kendall County, but the community is no more than 4 to 5 miles away from the river.

According to the 2021 census gazetteer files, Mission Township has a total area of 32.11 square miles (83.16 km^{2}), of which 31.68 square miles (82.05 km^{2}) (or 98.68%) is land and 0.42 square miles (1.09 km^{2}) (or 1.32%) is water.

=== Notable Locations ===
- Norwegian Memorial (Norway), site of plaques from the Norwegian King commemorating the community's founding in 1834.
- Agricultural Crash Memorial (Norway), site of a crashed plane, which symbolized the sudden and abrupt economic decline in agricultural prices during the 1980s.
- Jessie Walker Memorial (Sheridan), commemorates the circuit-riding ministers who gave the township its name, the most notable of whom was Jessie Walker. The memorial is along the side of the Sheridan United Methodist Church in town.
- Sheridan Correctional Facility (Sheridan), facility run by the Illinois Department of Corrections for rehabilitation, and is currently rated as a medium-security facility.
- Robert Rowe Public Library (Sheridan), library named for local philanthropist and descendant of one of the community's founding families, houses historical records about the area.
- Norsk Museum (Norway), shows how life was like for the Norwegian settlers in the early years of the community.
- Sheridan Veterans Memorial (Sheridan), now complete, and it honors the branches of the military, the town's contributions to every armed conflict, and all who have served.

== Demographics ==
As of the 2020 census there were 4,019 people, 1,102 households, and 791 families residing in the township. The population density was 125.18 inhabitants per square mile (48.33/km^{2}). There were 1,068 housing units at an average density of 33.26 per square mile (12.84/km^{2}). The racial makeup of the township was 66.38% White, 24.73% African American, 0.35% Native American, 0.22% Asian, 0.00% Pacific Islander, 4.95% from other races, and 3.36% from two or more races. Hispanic or Latino of any race were 7.09% of the population.

There were 1,102 households, out of which 25.70% had children under the age of 18 living with them, 49.18% were married couples living together, 11.25% had a female householder with no spouse present, and 28.22% were non-families. 26.20% of all households were made up of individuals, and 6.40% had someone living alone who was 65 years of age or older. The average household size was 2.25 and the average family size was 2.59.

The township's age distribution consisted of 10.8% under the age of 18, 12.7% from 18 to 24, 42.2% from 25 to 44, 26% from 45 to 64, and 8.5% who were 65 years of age or older. The median age was 36.0 years. For every 100 females, there were 279.9 males. For every 100 females age 18 and over, there were 338.2 males.

The median income for a household in the township was $70,107, and the median income for a family was $77,083. Males had a median income of $55,179 versus $25,714 for females. The per capita income for the township was $20,656. About 3.4% of families and 6.8% of the population were below the poverty line, including 8.6% of those under age 18 and 3.4% of those age 65 or over.

Historical population
Census	Pop.	Note	%±
2010	3,972		—
2020	4,019		1.2%
U.S. Decennial Census

== County Highways ==
- CH 3 (South of Sheridan) 2603rd Road/Sheridan-Norway Road/Gerald "Jerry" Johnson Highway
- CH 3 (In Sheridan) Robinson Street
- CH 3 (North of Sheridan) 2603rd Road, 4251st Road, 2750th Road/Sheridan Blacktop
- CH 32 N 41st Road/Si Johnson Avenue/Bowen Road
- CH 31 E 30th Road/Millington Road
