= Northville, Illinois =

- Unincorporated community
- Location within Illinois Location within the United States
- Coordinates: 41°33′48″N 88°42′19″W
- Country: United States
- State: Illinois
- County: LaSalle
- Township: Northville
- Settled: 1834
- Elevation: 656 ft (200 m)
- Time zone: UTC-6 (Central (CST))
  - Summer (DST): UTC-5 (CDT)
- Area codes: 815 & 779
- GNIS feature ID: 414702

Northville is an unincorporated community in Northville Township, LaSalle County, Illinois, United States. Northville is located on County Highway 2 and North 4325th Road. The Fox River is just south of the community, and once formed the southern boundary of the town.

Canadian Benjamin Lett, known as the "Rob Roy" of Canada, lived on his family's farm in Northville, in the 1850s. He is buried at Lett Cemetery, near Northville.
