= Stephen Wright House =

Historic house in Illinois, United States

- U.S. National Register of Historic Places
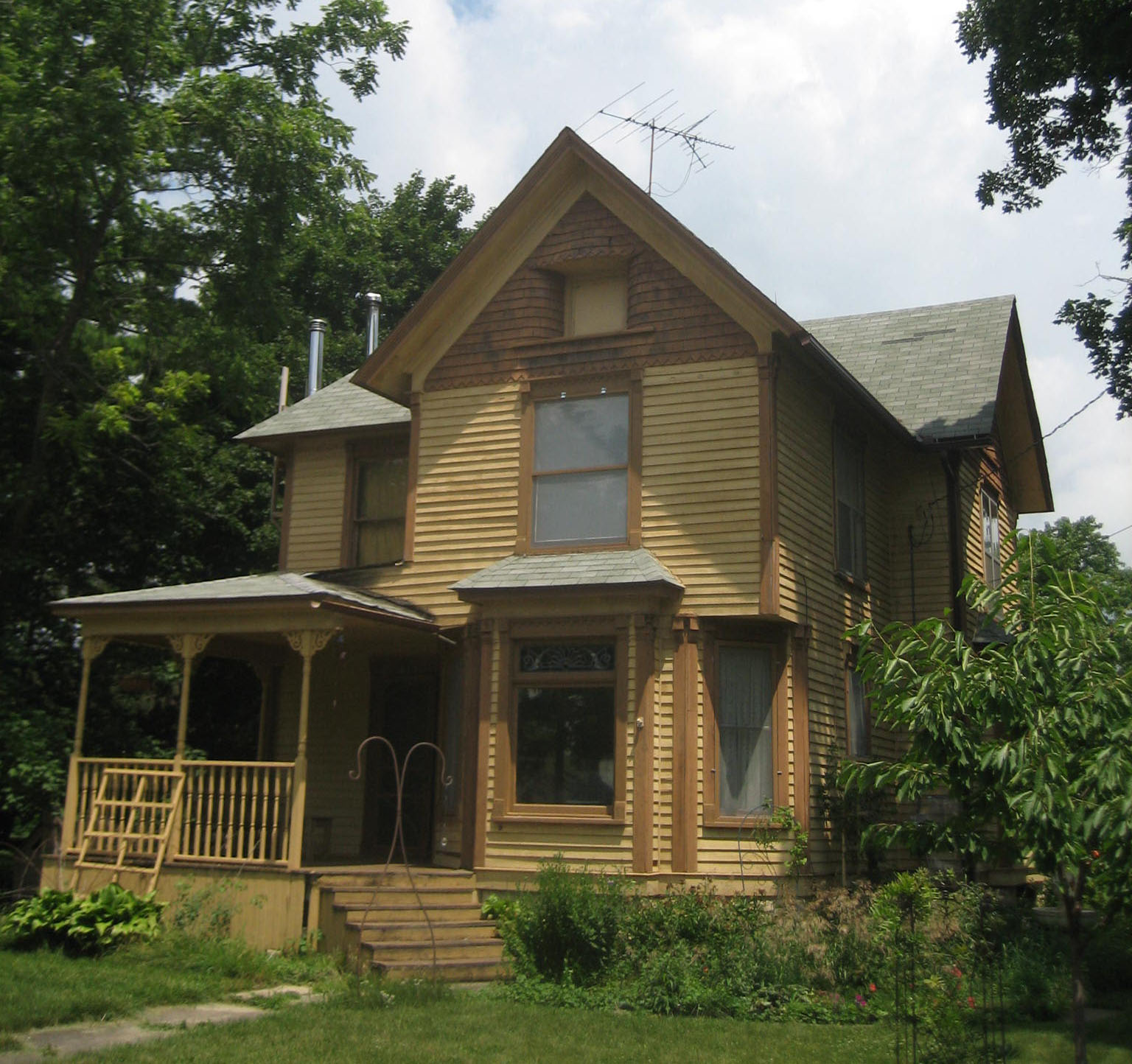

- Location within Illinois Location within the United States
- Location: 612 Chicago Rd., Paw Paw, Illinois
- Coordinates: 41°41′23″N 88°59′13″W
- Area: less than one acre
- Built: c. 1895-1906
- Built by: Stephen Wright, architect unknown
- Architectural style: Queen Anne style
- NRHP reference No.: 05000433
- Added to NRHP: May 22, 2005

The Stephen Wright House is a home located in the Lee County, Illinois, United States, village of Paw Paw. The Queen Anne style home was constructed sometime between 1895 and 1906 by Paw Paw real estate speculator Stephen Wright. Located along a former Native American trail and stagecoach line, the home is in an area of very similar Queen Anne style homes which may have also been built by Wright. Wright had left the property by 1906 and sold the property to another Paw Paw resident who stayed in the house until his death. The Stephen Wright House was listed on the U.S. National Register of Historic Places on May 22, 2005.

== Location ==
The Stephen Wright House is located along a road that was historically used as a stage coach trail from Galena, Illinois to Chicago; prior to that, the trail was used by the Potawatomi Indians. Today the stretch of former stage coach is County Route 10 and known locally as Chicago Road. The house itself sits back 30 ft (9.1 m) from the road, and the lawn is enclosed by a picket fence. Behind the house is a garage which is considered a non-contributing factor to the significance of the property by the U.S. National Register of Historic Places . The property size has been reduced from its original 4 acres (16,000 m^{2}) to the current area of less than 1-acre (4,000 m^{2}).

== History ==
The Stephen Wright House is believed to have been built by Paw Paw real estate speculator and Illinois native Stephen Wright around 1895. 1895 tax records indicate that the lot where the house stands sold for US$100; Wright bought it from a local farmer who owned a large amount of land in Paw Paw, then known as Wyoming Township. By 1906, records indicate that the property was transferred for a larger sum, $4,000, thus, it is believed that the home was constructed sometime between 1895 and 1906. Wright still owned the property in 1900 but by 1906 it had been sold to Ezra Bretz. Bretz was a native of nearby Brooklyn Township and he lived in the home until his death in the 1940s. After Bretz died the house was converted into a duplex apartment, a state it remained in until it was acquired by the Paw Paw Bible Church in the 1950s. The Bible Church converted the structure back into a single-family residence for use as a parsonage. In 2002 the house was purchased by its current owners but the Bible Church retained much of the original 4-acre (16,000 m^{2}) site. The site once held a barn which is no longer extant.

== Architecture ==
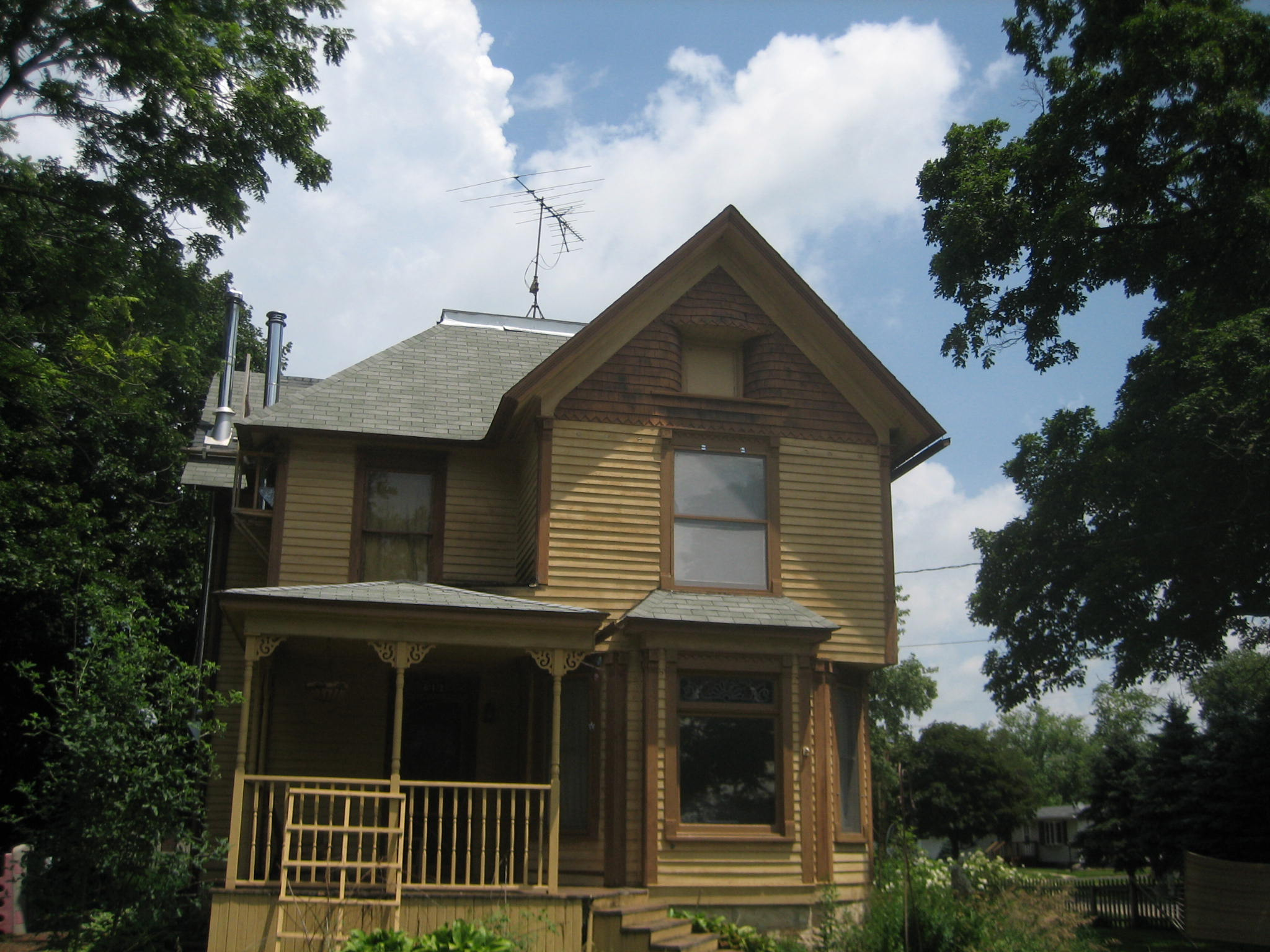
The hip roof is distinctly visible and a common element in Queen Anne style homes.

The Stephen Wright House is an example of late 19th century Queen Anne style and stands on a block with three other very similar houses. The similarities suggest that Wright, a real estate speculator, may have built all three other houses as well. Though the home's builder is known, Wright, its architect is unknown.

The house has a moderate-pitch hip roof with lower intersecting gables and asphalt shingles. At the top of the roof is a 14 ft (4.3 m) by 14 ft (4.3 m) area which is flat, giving the roof its hipped quality; the area may have once hosted iron fretwork. This subtype of Queen Anne style, classified as "hipped roof with lower cross gables" is among the most distinctive of Queen Anne characteristics and occurs in over half of all Queen Anne style homes.

The entire home stands upon a limestone foundation. The exterior is clad in narrow wooden Clapboarding and the corner boards are topped with a trim that resembles Doric capitals. The front facade features a large projecting gabled wing extending out from the principle hip roof portion of the home. Directly beneath the projecting gable's eave is decorative shingle work, a common element in Queen Anne style architecture.

== Significance ==
The Wright House is an excellent local example of Queen Anne style architecture. Aspects of the home's massing as well as its ornate, Queen Anne details contribute to its excellence as an example of the style. The Stephen Wright House was listed on the U.S. National Register of Historic Places on May 22, 2005.
