= Paw Paw High School (Illinois) =

Location
- 511 Champman Street; Paw Paw, Lee County, Illinois 61353; United States
- Coordinates: 41.6903°N 88.9778°W

Information
- Type: Comprehensive Public High School
- Established: 1841
- Status: closed
- Closed: 2019
- School district: Paw Paw Community Unit School District 271
- Principal: Stan Adcock
- Grades: 9–12
- Campus type: Rural, fringe
- Colors: Purple, Gold
- Athletics conference: Little Ten
- Mascot: Bulldogs
- Feeder schools: Paw Paw Junior High School
- Website: Paw Paw Schools

Paw Paw High School, or PPHS, was a public high school in Paw Paw, Illinois from 1841 until 2019. The campus was located 20 miles south of Rochelle, Illinois, and served a mixed village and rural residential community. It was a part of Paw Paw Community Unit School District 271.

== History ==
Paw Paw High School originally ran for three years. The first graduating class was in 1842. In 1896, the school moved from a three year curriculum to four years, and therefore had no graduating class that year.

In January 1883 the frame schoolhouse burned to the ground. In January 1897, the brick schoolhouse which replaced it in 1885 for a cost of $12,000 also burned to the ground. It was insured for $8,000, and was out of reach of the fire system. In 1897, a new building was designed, to be built for a cost of $15,000. The building was designed by Weary and Habu of Freeport, Illinois. The old school grounds were exchanged for a new four-acre site.

In 2018 it was proposed that the high school students, and one teacher, be sent to Indian Creek High School (of the Indian Creek Community Unit School District 425), with whom they already shared some resources including athletics teams and Spanish classes. Part of the attraction of Indian Creek was a significantly larger number of available course offerings. The citizens of Paw Paw voted to close the high school (as of the spring of 2019) and send their children to Indian Creek, but still retained Kindergarten through 8th grade.

The deactivation was for a two year period. In 2021 the district reevaluated the situation, and additionally, nearby Mendota High School invited Paw Paw to send their high school students there. Indian Creek had offered to take 60 Paw Paw students for $10,500 per student; transportation would be an additional $150,000 per year. Mendota offered to educate the students for $6,000 per year.

A 2022 survey found that students were able to take more classes and approved of the move. The high school building was repurposed for junior high school.

== Academics ==
In 2009, 62% of Paw Paw High School students met or exceeded standards on the Prairie State Achievement Exam, an Illinois state test part of the No Child Left Behind Act. The average high school graduation rate in the period 1999–2009 was 89.1%.

== Athletics ==
Paw Paw High School competed in the Little Ten Conference and was a member school in the Illinois High School Association. Their mascot was the Bulldogs, with school colors of purple and gold. The school has no state championships on record in team athletics and activities.

After discontinuing football for 47 years, Paw Paw reinstituted the sport (8 man football) with a partial basis in 1956. The inaugural team fielded 11 players. In 1956 a full schedule was implemented, with a plan to join a conference the next year.

== Notable people ==
- Robben Wright Fleming, lawyer, professor, academic administrator, president of the University of Michigan
