= Jesse Walker (Methodist) =

American minister (1766–1835)

Reverend Jesse Walker
- Born: June 9, 1766; Buckingham County, Virginia
- Died: October 5, 1835 (aged 69); Cook County, Illinois
- Burial place: Plainfield Township Cemetery
- Known for: Methodist minister in Illinois and Missouri
- Spouse: Susannah Webly
- Church: Methodist

Jesse Walker (June 9, 1766 - October 5, 1835) was the Buckingham County, Virginia-born Methodist minister who built Missouri's first Methodist church in the predominantly French-Catholic city of St. Louis, Missouri in 1819, and the first Methodist church in Chicago, Illinois in 1831. He organized this first permanent Methodist group in Missouri at St. Louis on January 7, 1821, after previously finding 20 members in 1807. On August 10, 1821, Missouri entered the Union as the 24th state. In 1822, the Methodists held their annual conference in St. Louis.

== Early life ==
Walker was born into a Baptist family, but he joined the Methodist Church at the age of 10.

Walker married Susannah Webly, who was from a staunch Virginia Episcopalian family. The native Virginia couple traveled to North Carolina and then Tennessee, settling near Nashville. Walker supported his family by dressing furs and preparing deer-hides, the most common material for clothing in this era.

== Methodist ministry ==
Walker was also the founder of the Methodist Episcopal Church in Illinois and Missouri. He has been considered perhaps the Methodist Church's most pioneer frontier preacher as between 1802 and 1835 he served from Tennessee to Missouri and from Southern Illinois to Wisconsin. Walker was also instrumental in spreading Christianity to the Native Americans.

=== Illinois ===
He preached in Tennessee and Kentucky until 1806 when presiding elder William McKendree selected Walker to be the lone Methodist representative for Illinois as the previous appointee did not fill out the year, making him the fourth Methodist preacher appointed to this state.

Walker, his wife, and their two teenage daughters settled in St. Clair County, Illinois. In April 1807, he held what is thought to have been the first camp meeting in Illinois near present-day Edwardsville, Illinois. Years later in 1820, the first Methodist Conference ever held in Illinois was located at a place which became known as Shiloh, Illinois. In 1812, Walker was made presiding elder of the Illinois District which had been organized a year earlier.

=== Missouri ===
Between 1816 and 1819, Walker was moved to the Missouri District as he had previously traveled into the state in 1807 and 1809.

With little money and materials, Walker was given some Illinois trees to be used as logs for the construction of the first Methodist church in Missouri. The local Episcopalians had lost their pastor and decided to donate their pulpit and pews. This first church measured 25 by 30 feet.

=== Return to Illinois ===
In 1826 Jesse Walker established a mission at the head of Mission Creek, just three miles from the present town of Sheridan, Illinois.

Walker was sent to Peoria, Illinois, in 1828. In 1830, Walker was appointed to the Chicago Mission.

== Death ==
His wife Susannah Webly Walker died in 1832. Jesse Walker died in 1835 in Cook County, Illinois. He was buried in a pioneer cemetery. In 1850, his remains were moved to the Plainfield Township Cemetery in Plainfield, Illinois. A historical marker was erected in 1911 by the Methodist Church.
