= Paw Paw, Illinois =

Village of Paw Paw
- Village
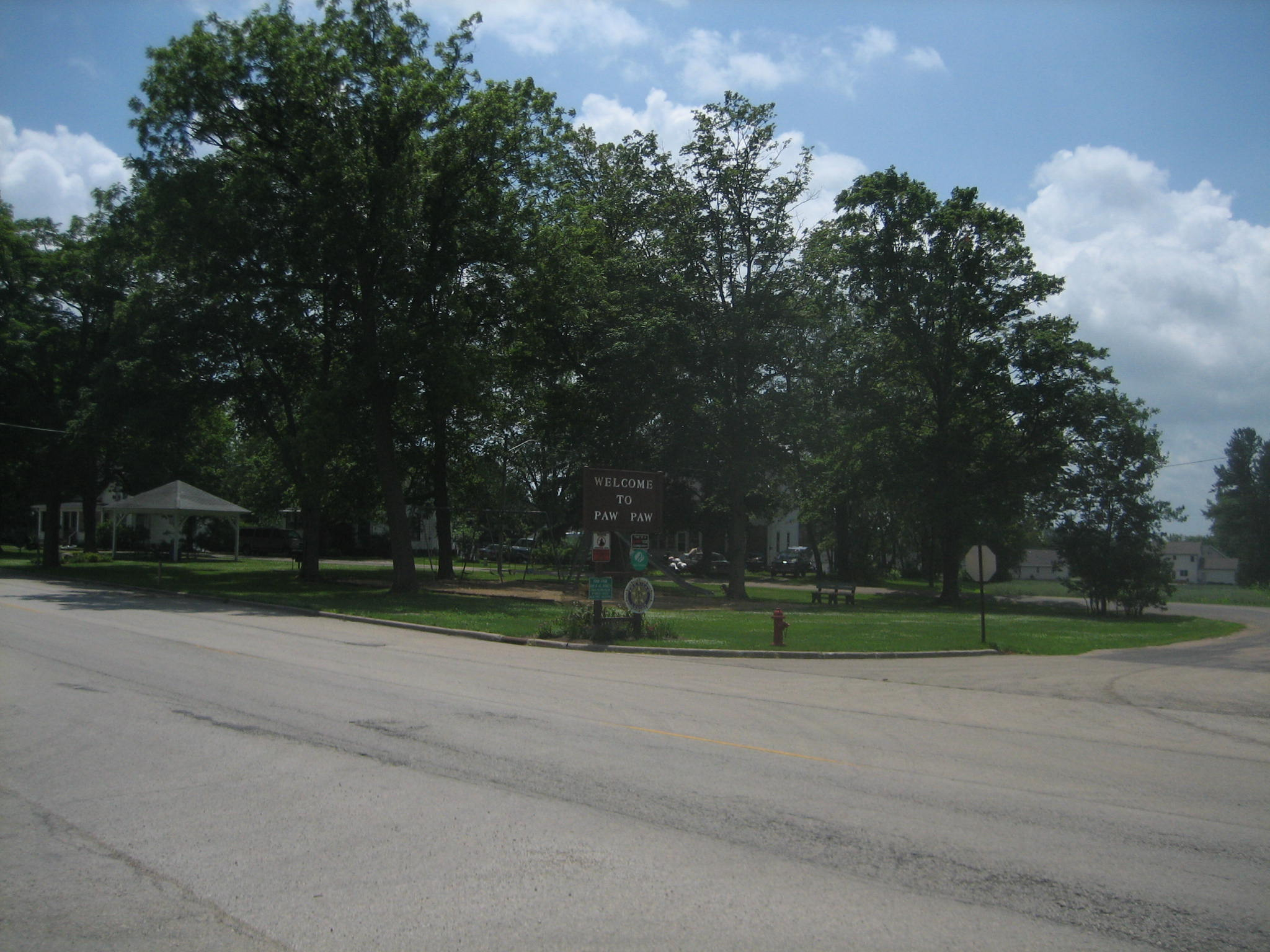
- Chicago Road as it enters the village of Paw Paw.

- Location of Paw Paw in Lee County, Illinois.
- Coordinates: 41°41′18″N 88°58′47″W
- Country: United States
- State: Illinois
- County: Lee

Area
  - Total: 0.60 sq mi (1.55 km^{2})
  - Land: 0.60 sq mi (1.55 km^{2})
  - Water: 0 sq mi (0.00 km^{2})
- Elevation: 938 ft (286 m)

Population (2020)
  - Total: 830
  - Density: 1,384.7/sq mi (534.63/km^{2})
- Time zone: UTC-6 (CST)
  - Summer (DST): UTC-5 (CDT)
- Postal code: 61353
- FIPS code: 17-58226
- GNIS feature ID: 2399633
- Website: http://pawpawil.org/

Paw Paw is a village in Lee County in the U.S. state of Illinois. As of the 2020 census, the village was home to 830 people, down from 870 at the 2010 census. It was settled in the mid 19th century and by 1878 the village had a railroad connection. Paw Paw is home to a house which is listed on the U.S. National Register of Historic Places and was the recipient of a 2005 federal grant to construct a water tower.

== History ==
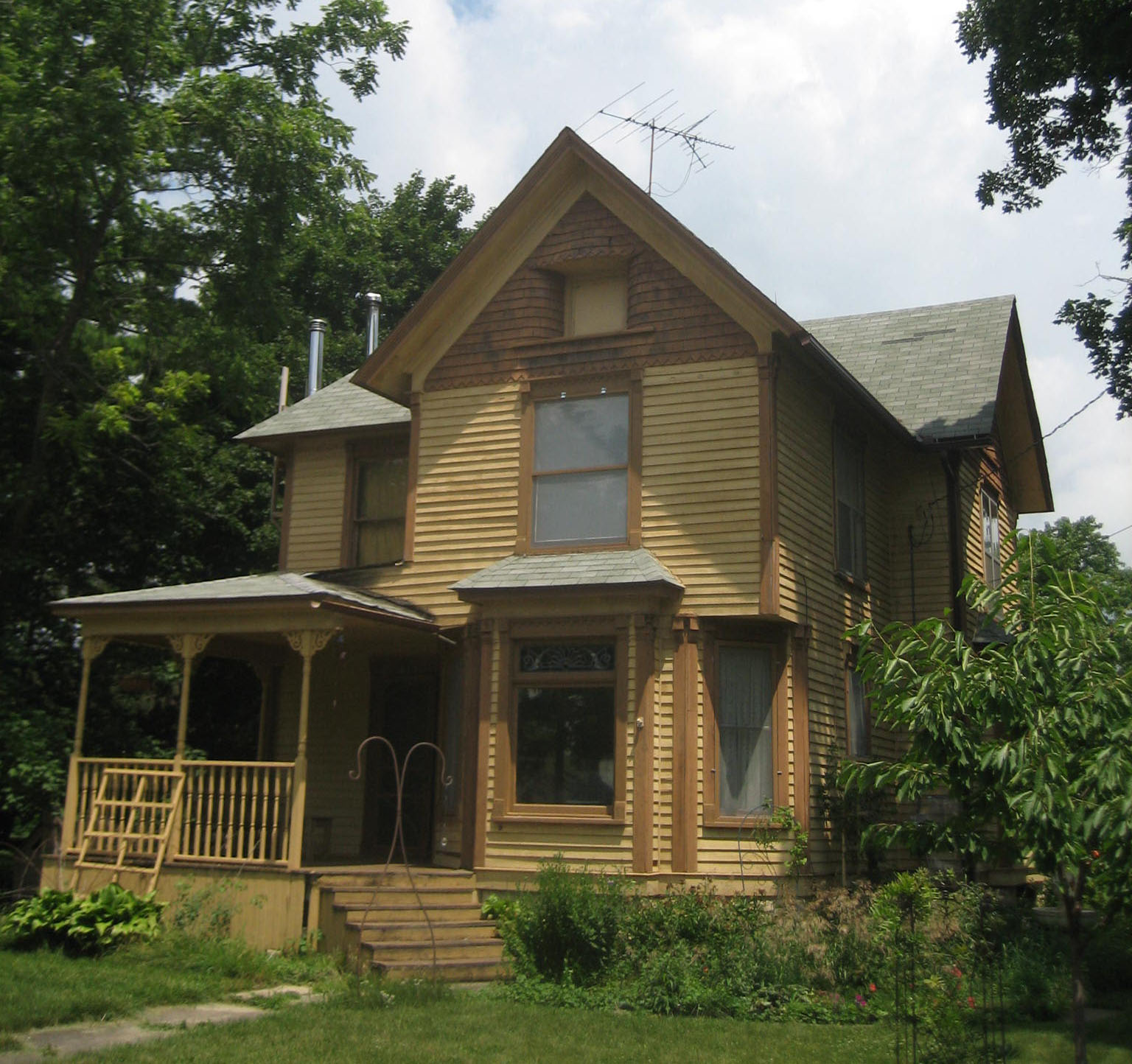
The Stephen Wright House is listed on the U.S. National Register of Historic Places.

In 1829, present-day Chicago Road was part of the Frink and Walker stagecoach line from Galena, Illinois to Chicago, though the Potawatomi Indians were the first to use the trail. The tribe didn't turn over the area to the U.S. government until 1833. Frink and Walker also held the mail contract for the area's settlers. The route became popular and garnered a mention in the work of writer Margaret Fuller.

Paw Paw's first permanent resident was David A. Town in 1834, a native of Vermont, Town settled on the southeast side of a 2,000-acre (8 km^{2}) grove. The first cabin was built the next spring by Edward Butterfield on the site of Paw Paw. This first house also held the village's first store and would eventually become the first structure in town to burn. During its earliest days, the town was sectioned off into East, West, and South Paw Paw, all of which became known as simply Paw Paw. In 1837, the village got its first postmaster, William Rodgers. Before, the nearest post office was 20 miles away in Somonauk. In 1839, a new road was constructed which allowed mail to be carried from Paw Paw to Princeton. The first stagecoach station (known as a "Tavern") was built along Chicago Road and operated by Isaac Balding. Balding operated the station until the railroad came to town several years later.

Though settlement in present-day Paw Paw began during the 1830s, by 1847 there were probably no more than 50 people in the village. The name Paw Paw was derived from a nearby grove of Pawpaw trees on the edge of a 2,000-acre (8 km^{2}) forest. American general Winfield Scott is credited with being the first person of European ancestry to discover the area. The area that Paw Paw is located in was home to more than one stand of Paw Paw trees, thus more than one settlement took the name Paw Paw. To avoid confusion the townspeople renamed the village Wyoming Township. The new name came from the Wyoming Valley in Pennsylvania, where many of Paw Paw's earliest settlers originated. The Wyoming Valley was the scene of a massacre during the American Revolution in which over 300 American settlers were killed by Native Americans allied with the British. Many of Paw Paw's early settlers shared surnames with those who are listed as having been involved in the fighting and massacre.

In 1850, Wyoming Township experienced a growth spurt despite being passed over for the coveted railroad link, by this time there were several businesses and a school. By 1878, the village finally got a railroad connection, was home to two newspapers, three churches and was christened, officially, as Paw Paw. The village was officially established in 1882 and is celebrating its 125th anniversary in 2007.

In June 1890 a cyclone destroyed much of Paw Paw, including a schoolhouse. Fourteen people were killed, including 7 in the school.

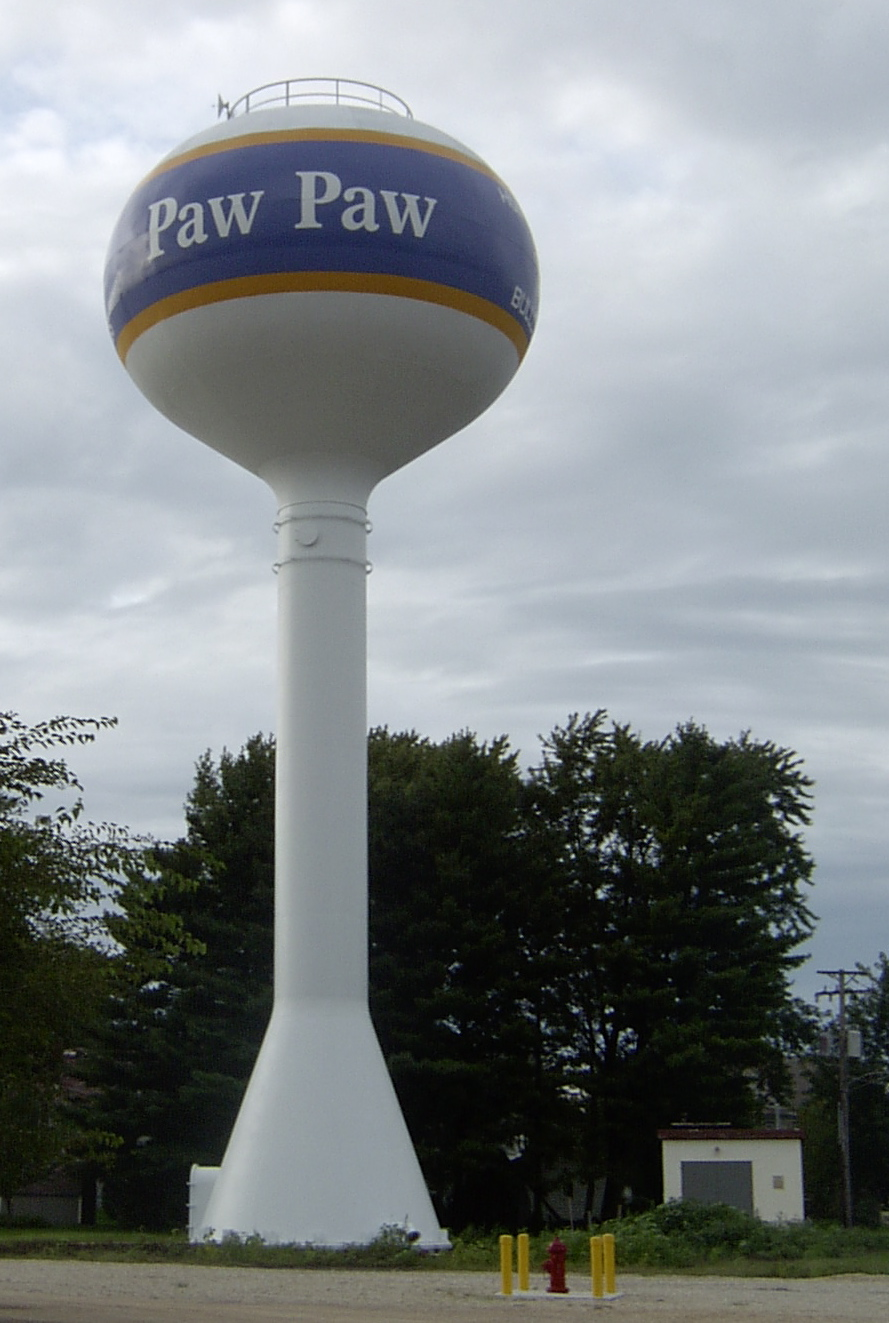
Paw Paw, IL water tower, built in 2007

In 2005, the village received some U.S. federal government attention. On May 22 of that year, a local Queen Anne style house, the Stephen Wright House was listed in the U.S. National Register of Historic Places, it is the only property with that designation in Paw Paw. The same year the village was the recipient of a US$192,000 United States Environmental Protection Agency earmark to construct an elevated water tower.

== Demographics ==
Historical population
Census	Pop.	Note	%±
1880	476		—
1900	765		—
1910	709		−7.3%
1920	665		−6.2%
1930	559		−15.9%
1940	523		−6.4%
1950	594		13.6%
1960	725		22.1%
1970	846		16.7%
1980	839		−0.8%
1990	791		−5.7%
2000	852		7.7%
2010	870		2.1%
2020	830		−4.6%
U.S. Decennial Census

As of the 2020 census there were 830 people, 389 households, and 258 families residing in the village. The population density was 1,451.05 inhabitants per square mile (560.25/km^{2}). There were 399 housing units at an average density of 697.55 per square mile (269.33/km^{2}). The racial makeup of the village was 89.04% White, 1.81% African American, 0.36% Native American, 0.00% Asian, 0.00% Pacific Islander, 1.45% from other races, and 7.35% from two or more races. Hispanic or Latino of any race were 5.30% of the population.

There were 389 households, out of which 27.5% had children under the age of 18 living with them, 48.59% were married couples living together, 5.40% had a female householder with no husband present, and 33.68% were non-families. 22.62% of all households were made up of individuals, and 11.83% had someone living alone who was 65 years of age or older. The average household size was 3.16 and the average family size was 2.57.

The village's age distribution consisted of 23.3% under the age of 18, 8.7% from 18 to 24, 29% from 25 to 44, 24.9% from 45 to 64, and 14.0% who were 65 years of age or older. The median age was 34.8 years. For every 100 females, there were 113.5 males. For every 100 females age 18 and over, there were 129.3 males.

The median income for a household in the village was $51,696, and the median income for a family was $65,536. Males had a median income of $41,098 versus $26,364 for females. The per capita income for the village was $25,256. About 7.4% of families and 8.5% of the population were below the poverty line, including 3.5% of those under age 18 and 3.6% of those age 65 or over.

== Geography ==
According to the 2021 census gazetteer files, Paw Paw has a total area of 0.57 square miles (1.48 km^{2}), all land. The village is located within close reach of Interstate 39.

=== Climate ===
Humid continental climate is a climatic region typified by large seasonal temperature differences, with warm to hot (and often humid) summers and cold (sometimes severely cold) winters. The Köppen Climate Classification subtype for this climate is "Dfa" (Hot Summer Continental Climate).

Climate data for Paw Paw, Illinois (1991–2020 normals, extremes 1935–present)
Month	Jan	Feb	Mar	Apr	May	Jun	Jul	Aug	Sep	Oct	Nov	Dec	Year
Record high °F (°C)	64 (18)	75 (24)	83 (28)	92 (33)	95 (35)	101 (38)	101 (38)	99 (37)	93 (34)	90 (32)	76 (24)	68 (20)	101 (38)
Mean maximum °F (°C)	49.1 (9.5)	52.6 (11.4)	68.8 (20.4)	79.5 (26.4)	86.7 (30.4)	91.2 (32.9)	91.4 (33.0)	89.3 (31.8)	87.4 (30.8)	82.1 (27.8)	66.4 (19.1)	52.3 (11.3)	93.5 (34.2)
Mean daily maximum °F (°C)	27.9 (−2.3)	32.2 (0.1)	44.9 (7.2)	59.0 (15.0)	70.3 (21.3)	79.6 (26.4)	81.9 (27.7)	80.3 (26.8)	74.9 (23.8)	62.5 (16.9)	46.4 (8.0)	33.3 (0.7)	57.8 (14.3)
Daily mean °F (°C)	19.9 (−6.7)	23.9 (−4.5)	35.4 (1.9)	47.7 (8.7)	59.3 (15.2)	68.9 (20.5)	71.8 (22.1)	69.9 (21.1)	63.2 (17.3)	51.1 (10.6)	37.2 (2.9)	25.5 (−3.6)	47.8 (8.8)
Mean daily minimum °F (°C)	11.8 (−11.2)	15.6 (−9.1)	25.9 (−3.4)	36.4 (2.4)	48.2 (9.0)	58.3 (14.6)	61.7 (16.5)	59.5 (15.3)	51.5 (10.8)	39.7 (4.3)	28.1 (−2.2)	17.7 (−7.9)	37.9 (3.3)
Mean minimum °F (°C)	−10.2 (−23.4)	−3.7 (−19.8)	7.7 (−13.5)	22.8 (−5.1)	34.1 (1.2)	45.6 (7.6)	51.9 (11.1)	49.6 (9.8)	38.1 (3.4)	25.6 (−3.6)	12.7 (−10.7)	−2.0 (−18.9)	−14.1 (−25.6)
Record low °F (°C)	−28 (−33)	−33 (−36)	−16 (−27)	9 (−13)	24 (−4)	36 (2)	41 (5)	37 (3)	29 (−2)	16 (−9)	−7 (−22)	−20 (−29)	−33 (−36)
Average precipitation inches (mm)	1.60 (41)	1.73 (44)	2.19 (56)	3.20 (81)	4.83 (123)	4.62 (117)	3.90 (99)	3.74 (95)	3.58 (91)	2.99 (76)	2.44 (62)	1.93 (49)	36.75 (933)
Average snowfall inches (cm)	9.6 (24)	6.7 (17)	3.6 (9.1)	0.9 (2.3)	0.0 (0.0)	0.0 (0.0)	0.0 (0.0)	0.0 (0.0)	0.0 (0.0)	0.1 (0.25)	1.7 (4.3)	7.5 (19)	30.1 (76)
Average extreme snow depth inches (cm)	6.7 (17)	5.9 (15)	3.7 (9.4)	0.4 (1.0)	0.0 (0.0)	0.0 (0.0)	0.0 (0.0)	0.0 (0.0)	0.0 (0.0)	0.0 (0.0)	1.1 (2.8)	5.2 (13)	10.7 (27)
Average precipitation days (≥ 0.01 in)	8.3	7.0	8.9	11.2	12.0	10.7	9.2	8.7	8.1	9.0	8.3	8.7	110.1
Average snowy days (≥ 0.1 in)	5.3	3.9	2.1	0.6	0.0	0.0	0.0	0.0	0.0	0.1	1.1	4.1	17.2
Source: NOAA

== Education ==
Public education in Paw Paw is overseen by Unit 271 school district. The district operates Paw Paw Junior High School and Paw Paw Elementary School. Paw Paw Jr/Sr High School opened in 1841 and closed in 2019, with students being sent to Indian Creek High School (of the Indian Creek Community Unit School District 425).

== Notable people ==
- George Bristow, outfielder for the Cleveland Spiders
- Ulysses S. Guyer, U.S. Representative (R-KA)
- Jesse Harper, football coach
- Robben Wright Fleming, educator
