= Northville Township, LaSalle County, Illinois =

Northville Township
- Township
- Location in LaSalle County

- LaSalle County's location in Illinois
- Coordinates: 41°35′17″N 88°39′34″W
- Country: United States
- State: Illinois
- County: LaSalle
- Established: November 6, 1849

Area
  - Total: 33.46 sq mi (86.7 km^{2})
  - Land: 32.70 sq mi (84.7 km^{2})
  - Water: 0.76 sq mi (2.0 km^{2}) 2.28%
- Elevation: 649.6 ft (198.0 m)

Population (2020)
  - Total: 7,338
  - Density: 224.4/sq mi (86.64/km^{2})
- Time zone: UTC-6 (CST)
  - Summer (DST): UTC-5 (CDT)
- FIPS code: 17-54248
- Website: northvilletownshipofil.org

Northville Township is located in LaSalle County, Illinois. As of the 2020 census, its population was 7,338 and it contained 3,215 housing units.

== Geography ==
According to the 2021 census gazetteer files, Northville Township has a total area of 33.46 square miles (86.66 km^{2}), of which 32.70 square miles (84.69 km^{2}) (or 97.72%) is land and 0.76 square miles (1.97 km^{2}) (or 2.28%) is water.

The Communities of Sandwich, Sheridan, Northville, and Somonauk all contribute to the township's population, and with the township's recent growth, coupled with the difficulty of the county to respond quickly to the remote corner of the county, a County Sheriff Substation was constructed south of the Sandwich neighborhood of Lake Holiday. Sheridan, which mostly sits within Mission Township to the south, actually has a small area on the north side of the Fox River, which sits within the Northville Township limits.

== Demographics ==
As of the 2020 census there were 7,338 people, 2,664 households, and 2,139 families residing in the township. The population density was 219.32 inhabitants per square mile (84.68/km^{2}). There were 3,215 housing units at an average density of 96.09 per square mile (37.10/km^{2}). The racial makeup of the township was 90.31% White, 0.63% African American, 0.20% Native American, 0.31% Asian, 0.00% Pacific Islander, 1.80% from other races, and 6.75% from two or more races. Hispanic or Latino of any race were 6.36% of the population.

There were 2,664 households, out of which 30.60% had children under the age of 18 living with them, 68.06% were married couples living together, 7.85% had a female householder with no spouse present, and 19.71% were non-families. 14.60% of all households were made up of individuals, and 9.30% had someone living alone who was 65 years of age or older. The average household size was 2.68 and the average family size was 2.97.

The township's age distribution consisted of 22.6% under the age of 18, 8.1% from 18 to 24, 19.5% from 25 to 44, 31.2% from 45 to 64, and 18.6% who were 65 years of age or older. The median age was 44.9 years. For every 100 females, there were 111.3 males. For every 100 females age 18 and over, there were 106.5 males.

The median income for a household in the township was $82,762, and the median income for a family was $92,440. Males had a median income of $57,934 versus $35,942 for females. The per capita income for the township was $36,249. About 4.4% of families and 6.5% of the population were below the poverty line, including 13.1% of those under age 18 and 1.3% of those age 65 or over.

Historical population
Census	Pop.	Note	%±
2010	7,401		—
2020	7,338		−0.9%
U.S. Decennial Census

== Communities ==
- Lake Holiday (CDP)
- Millington*
- Northville (Unincorporated community)
- Sandwich*
- Sheridan (mostly located within Mission Township)
- Somonauk*
- Wildwood (Unincorporated subdivision, claimed by the City of Sandwich

Note: The star (*) denotes partial or full placement within a neighboring county
