= Hauge Lutheran Church (Goodhue County, Minnesota) =

Historic church in Minnesota, United States

- The Old Stone Church (owned by Hauge Lutheran Church)
- U.S. National Register of Historic Places
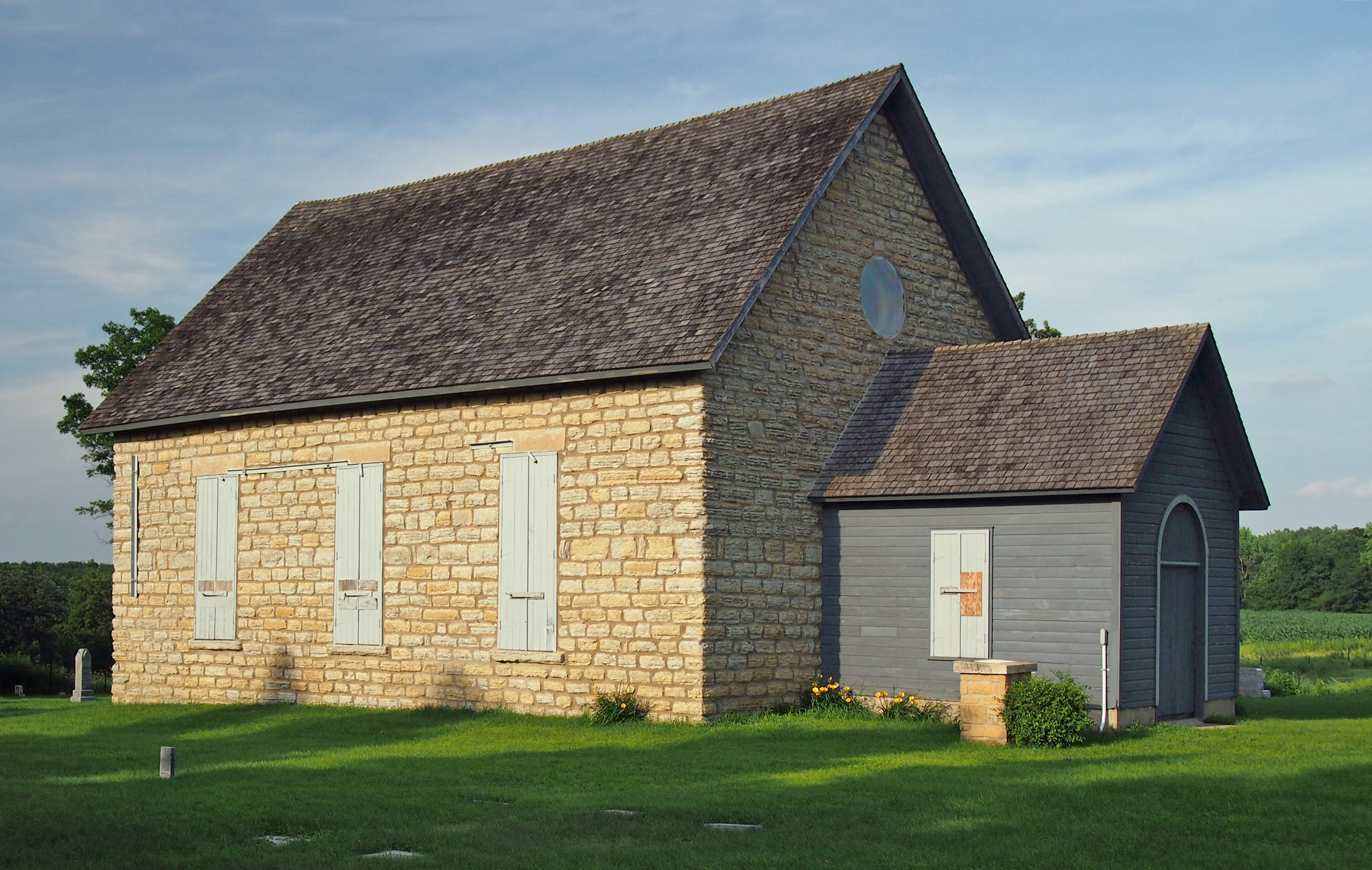
- Hauge Lutheran Church from the southwest

- Location within Minnesota Location within the United States
- Nearest city: Kenyon, Minnesota
- Coordinates: 44°15′20″N 93°1′18″W
- Area: 1.5 acres (0.61 ha)
- Built: 1871–1888
- MPS: Rural Goodhue County MRA
- NRHP reference No.: 80002048
- Added to NRHP: February 12, 1980

Hauge Lutheran Church is a historic church in Kenyon Township, Goodhue County, Minnesota.

The church was built between 1871 and 1888 1875 using stone from a nearby quarry. The congregation was incorporated in 1875 as Hauge Evangelical Lutheran Congregation of Kenyon. The congregation was affiliated with the Hauge Synod, one of the two primary Lutheran denominations among Norwegian immigrants in rural Goodhue County. In 1902, parish members decided to build a newer church in Kenyon and Hauge Lutheran church was closed. The church is maintained and occasionally used for special events. The church was added to the National Register of Historic Places in 1980.
