= Leland High School (Leland, Illinois) =

Location
- 370 N Main St; Leland, Illinois; United States
- 41°37′4.2″N 88°48′3.6″W

Information
- School district: Leland Community School District 1
- Principal: Chris Bickel
- Staff: 9.50 (FTE)
- Grades: 9-12
- Enrollment: 85 (2023-2024)
- Student to teacher ratio: 8.95
- Color
- Team name: Panthers
- Website: www.leland1.org

Leland High School is an American public high school located in Leland, Illinois. It serves grades 9 through 12 as part of the Leland Community School School District #1.

There are currently 62 students at Leland with a demographic distribution of 98% white students and the remaining 2% of Hispanic descent.
