= Hauge Lutheran Church (Norway, Illinois) =

Historic church in Illinois, United States

- U.S. National Register of Historic Places
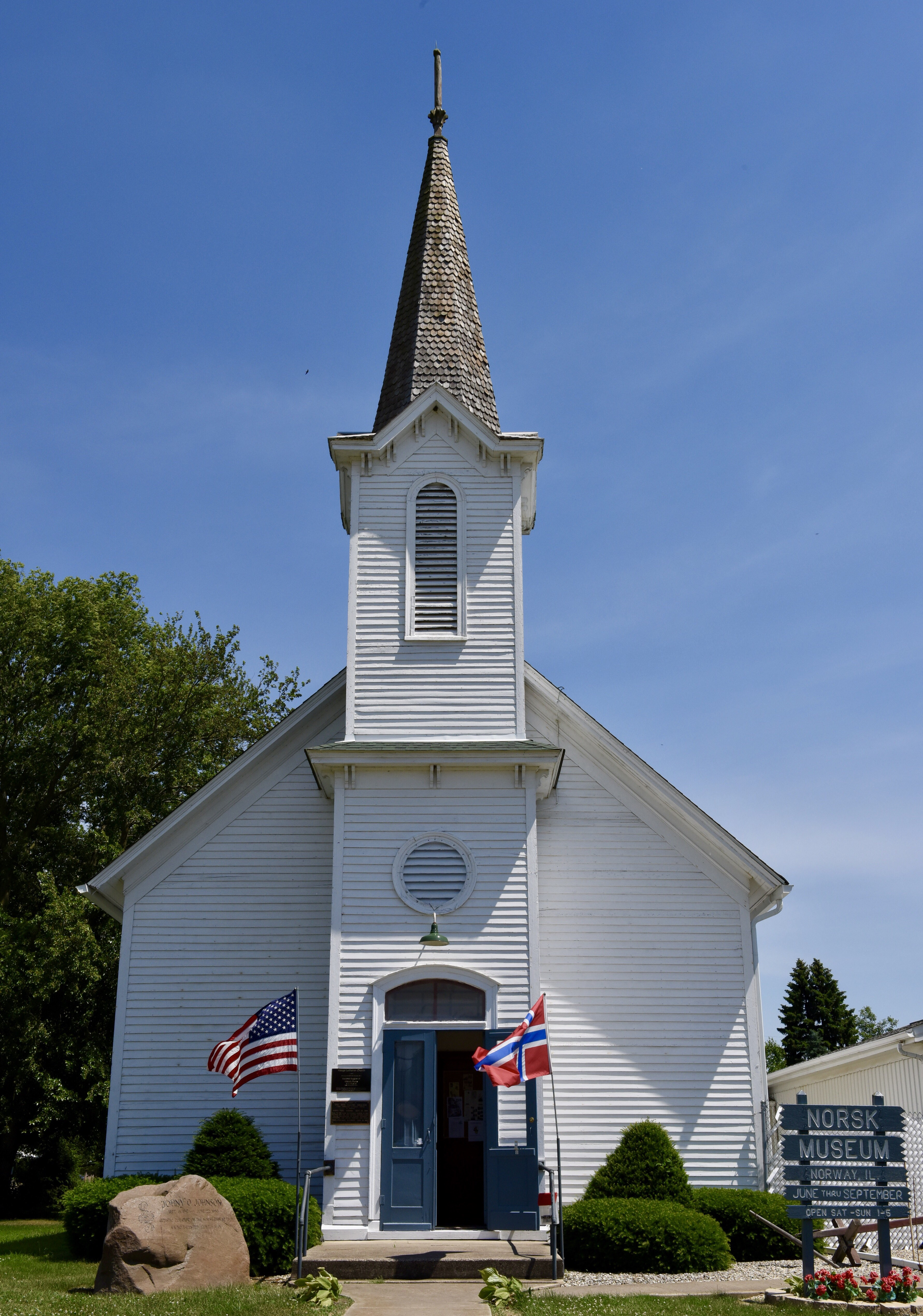

- Location within Illinois Location within the United States
- Location: 3656 E. 2631st Rd., Norway, Illinois
- Coordinates: 41°27′54″N 88°39′56″W
- Built: 1847
- NRHP reference No.: 15000932
- Added to NRHP: April 26, 2016

The Hauge Lutheran Church is a historic Lutheran church located at 3656 E. 2631st Road in Norway, Illinois. The church was built in 1847 for Norway's Lutheran congregation; the community had been founded thirteen years earlier as part of the Norwegian settlement of the Fox River Valley. The Norwegian Americans settling the Fox River Valley came from a short-lived settlement in New York and were supplemented by new Norwegian immigrants in the following years; the Fox River Valley is considered the first permanent Norwegian settlement in the United States. Minister Elling Eielsen, a follower of the Hauge Synod, established the first Norwegian Lutheran congregation in the United States at Norway in 1839. When the congregation's original log church burned down, they built the Hauge Lutheran Church as its replacement. The church served as a focal point of the Norwegian community until its congregation merged into another church in 1918. The building is now home to the Norsk Museum, a museum of Norwegian culture founded in 1978.

The church was added to the National Register of Historic Places on April 26, 2016.
