= Slooper =

Group of Norwegian immigrants to the United States

The sobriquet "Slooper" refers to the 52 Norwegians who traveled to the United States in 1825 aboard the sloop Restauration. Within the first 100 years, the Slooper community numbered at least 1,000 persons.

== History ==
The Sloopers came from Stavanger, Norway, to the U.S. in 1825 due to a variety of the circumstances. The director of the expedition and the chief owner of the boat was Lars Larson i Jeilane; the captain was Lars Olsen. The company consisted of 52 persons, all but one being natives of Stavanger and vicinity; the one exception was the mate, Nels Erikson, who came from Bergen, Norway.

Lars Larson was born near Stavanger, September 24, 1787. He became a sailor, was captured in the Napoleonic wars and kept a prisoner in London for seven years. Being released in 1814, he remained in London, however, till 1815, when he and several other prisoners returned to Norway. In London, they had been converted to the Quaker faith by Mrs. Margaret Allen, and upon returning to Stavanger, Chap Larson, Elias Tastad, Thomas Helle and Metta became the founders of the first Quaker society in that city.

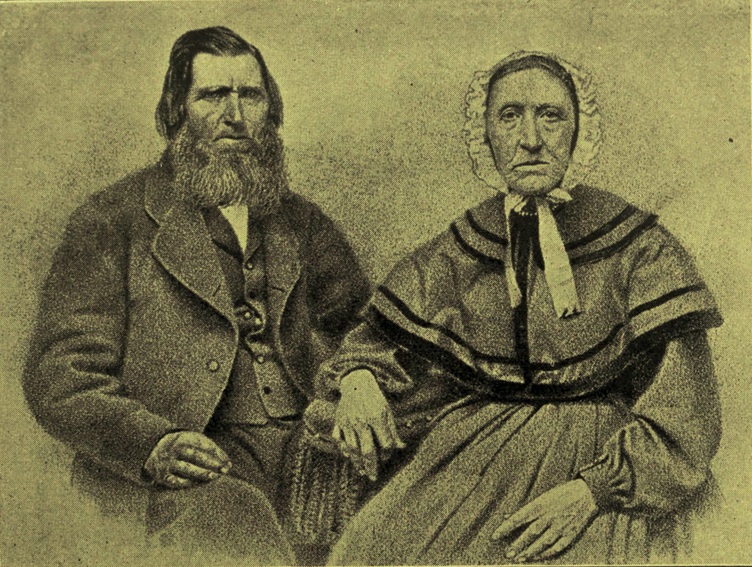
Nils Nilson Hersdal and his wife Bertha

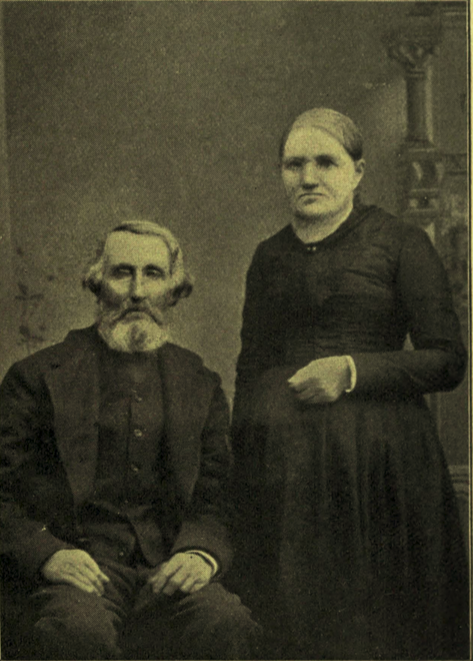
Nels Nelson Jr., the last male survivor of the sloopers, and his wife Kathrina

In 1821, the Stavanger Quakers began to form plans for emigrating to the U.S. Kleng Peerson and Knud Eide were deputed to go to the U.S. for the purpose of learning something of the country with a view to planting there a Quaker colony. Kleng Peerson returned to Stavanger in 1824 with a favorable report and many of the members of the Quaker colony began to make preparations for emigrating to the locality selected by Peerson, namely, Orleans County, New York State. A sloop of only 45 ton capacity which they called Restaurationen, built in Hardanger, was purchased and loaded with a cargo of iron and made ready for the journey. Larson himself had married in December 1824, Georgiana Person, who was born October 19, 1803, on Fogn, a small island near Stavanger. Besides him there were five other heads of families. On July 4, 1825, they set sail from Stavanger. The following 52 persons made up the party: Lars Larson and wife Martha Georgiana; Lars Olson, who was captain of the boat, Cornelius Nelson Hersdal, wife and four children; Daniel Stenson Rossadal, wife and five children; Thomas Madland, wife and three children; Nels Nelson Hersdal and wife Bertha, Knud Anderson Slogvig, Jacob Anderson Slogvig, Gudmund Haugaas, Johannes Stene, wife and two children, Öien Thorson (Thompson) wife and three children, Simon Lima, wife and three children, Henrik Christopherson Hervig, and wife, Ole Johnson, George Johnson, Thorsten Olson Bjaaland, Nels Thorson, Ole Olson Hetletvedt, Sara Larson (sister of Lars Larson), Halvor Iverson, Andrew Stangeland, the mate, Nels Erikson, and the cook, Endre Dahl.

After a perilous voyage of 14 weeks, they landed in New York, October 9, 1825. An account of that voyage was given by the New York papers at the time; it was reproduced in Norwegian translation in Billed-Magazin in 1869, and copied in other works. The arrival of this first party of Norwegian immigrants, and in so small a boat, created nothing less than a sensation at the time, as may be inferred from the wide attention the event received in the eastern press. Thus the New York Daily Advertiser for October 12, 1825, under the head lines, "A Novel Sight," gives an account of the boat, the destination of the immigrants, the country they came from, and their appearance.

In New York, the immigrants met Joseph Fellows, a Quaker, from whom they purchased land in Orleans County, New York. It seems to have been upon the suggestion of Fellows that they were induced to settle in Orleans County, although it is possible that the land had already been selected for them by Kleng Peerson, who was in New York at the time. The price to be paid for the land was US$5 an acre, each head of a family and adult person purchasing 40 acres (16 ha). The immigrants not being able to pay for the land, Fellows agreed to let them redeem it in ten annual installments.

Kleng Peerson led the group. After his stay in New York, he explored Illinois, Missouri, and Texas. Peerson was born May 17, 1782, on the estate Hesthammer in Tysvær Parish, province of Ryfylke. In 1820, was in Stavanger, where William Allen, an English Quaker, was then organizing a Quaker society. In 1821, Peerson and a certain Knud Olson Eide were commissioned by the Quakers to go to the U.S. and examine the possibility of organizing a Norwegian colony there. The two explorers secured work in New York City, but Knud Eide fell ill and died not long after, and Peerson went west alone in quest of a suitable location for a colony. Just how far west he may have come on this first journey is not known. After some time, he decided upon Orleans County on the shores of the Ontario as the best place to plant his colony, and in 1824, he returned to Norway. When Lars Larson's party prepared to go to the U.S., Peerson also left, but he did not take passage in Restaurationen. It seems that he embarked by way of Gothenburg and was in New York to receive the Sloopers upon their arrival.

Peerson did not go alone from Stavanger when he returned to the U.S. via Gothenburg in 1825. He was accompanied by Björn Björnson from Stavanger, a cousin of Peerson. Björnson brought his wife and several children with him, but left two girl twins, born in May of that year, with a relative who then lived in Tjensvold, near Stavanger.

Lars Larson and his family located in Rochester, New York where he prospered as a builder of canal boats. He kept in close touch with immigrant Norwegians during the two decades of his life there. His home became a kind of Mecca for hosts of intending settlers in the New World. Larson died by accident on a canal boat in November 1845, but his widow lived till October 1887. They had eight children, of whom the first one, Margaret Allen, was born on the Atlantic Ocean, September 2, 1825.

The colony was in many respects unfortunate. It did not prosper and never played any important part as a colony in Norwegian-American history. But it is important as being the first, and also as being the parent of a very large and progressive Norwegian settlement founded in 1834–35 in La Salle County, Illinois, known as the Fox River Settlement. Yet the economic conditions of the Quaker immigrants gradually became better and the future looked more promising. They felt now that the U.S. offered many advantages to the able and the capable, and they began writing encouraging letters to relatives and friends in Norway, urging them to seek their fortune here. As a result, there was a fairly constant emigration of individuals and families from Stavanger and adjacent region during the following eight or nine years, although few seem to have come before 1829. In this year came Gudmund Sandsberg (b. 1787) from Hjelmeland, in Ryfylke, Norway, and his wife Marie and three children, Bertha, Anna, and Torbjör.

Passage was secured in the beginning for the most part with American sailships carrying Swedish iron from Gothenburg. But as this was attended by much uncertainty, often necessitating several weeks of waiting, the intending emigrants began to go to Hamburg, Germany where German emigration by means of regular going American packet ships had already begun. Here, however, another difficulty met them. The already somewhat heavy emigration at this port made it necessary to order passage several weeks ahead in order to insure accommodations, and failing in this, the emigrant was forced to wait there until the next packet boat should sail. And so it came about that many of the early Norwegian immigrants to America came by way of Le Havre, France, where passage was always certain, emigration from this point being as yet very limited.

Among those who came via Gothenburg was Gjert Hovland, a farmer from Hardanger who left Norway with his family on June 24, 1831, sailed from Gothenburg June 30 and arrived in New York on September 18. He did not seem to go directly to Kendall, for soon after, he owned 50 acres (20 ha) of forest land in Morris County, New Jersey.

Gjert Hovland was the first one from the province of Hardanger to emigrate to the U.S. Other emigrants during these years were: Christian Olson, who came in 1829, settling in Kendall; Knut Evenson, wife and daughter Katherine, who emigrated in 1831 in the same ship by which Hovland came; and Ingebret Larson Narvig from Tysvær Parish, Ryfylke, who came in 1831 and two years later located in Michigan. It seems probable that also Johan Nordboe and wife from Ringebo, in Gudbrandsdalen, Norway, came to Orleans County in 1832. Nordboe was the first to emigrate from Gudbrandsdalen, a province from which actual immigration did not begin until sixteen years later.

Norwegian immigrants who came during these years generally located in Orleans County, but rarely remained there permanently. The northwestern states were just then beginning to be opened up to settlers. At this time migration from the eastern states was directed particularly to Illinois. Good government land could be had here for $1.25 an acre. The very heavily wooded land that the Norwegian immigrants in Orleans County had purchased proved very difficult of improvement, and many began to think of moving to a more favorable locality.

In 1833, Peerson, who seems to have lived in Kendall at this time, made a journey to the West, evidently for the purpose of finding a suitable site for a new settlement. He was accompanied by Ingebret Larson Narvig as far as Erie, Monroe County, Michigan, where the latter remained, Peerson continuing the journey farther west. After several months of wandering across Michigan, and down into Ohio and Indiana, he at last arrived at Chicago, then a village of about twenty huts. The marshes of Chicago did not appeal to Peerson and he went to Milwaukee, but the reports he received of the endless forests of Wisconsin soon drove him back again into Illinois. After several days' journey on foot again west of Chicago he at last found a spot which seemed to him as if providentially designated as the proper locality for his western colony. The place was immediately south of the present village of Norway in La Salle County. His choice made, Peerson returned to Orleans County, having covered over 2,000 miles (3,200 km) on foot since he left.

Peerson's selection was universally approved and a considerable number of the Kendall settlers decided to move west. Among those of the Sloopers who remained in New York were: Ole Johnson, Henrik C. Hervig and Andrew Stangeland, who, however, some years later bought a tract of land in Noble County, Indiana; Lars Olson located in New York City, and Lars Larson settled in Rochester; Nels Erikson went back to Norway, while Öien Thompson and Thomas Madland died in Kendall in 1826, and Cornelius Hersdal died there in 1833.

== Religion ==
Many of those who came in the sloop were Quakers. Instead of organizing themselves separately, they naturally attached themselves to American Quaker societies and worshiped with them. This was the case with Lars Larson (i Jeilane) in Rochester, with Ingebret Larson Narvig in Michigan, and with the Rossadals and Olsons in the Fox River Settlement. Some of the early Norwegian immigrants had no profound religious convictions and were agnostics. A considerable number of the sloopers were not only without religious convictions, but they seemed utterly to despise, and were fond of ridiculing ministers, churches, the Bible and religious people. Some of these agnostics had acquired their hostility to the Church and to religion before they emigrated from Norway. They became louder and more outspoken in their ridicule and denunciations after they arrived in the U.S.
