= Cleng Peerson =

Norwegian-American pioneer (1783–1865)

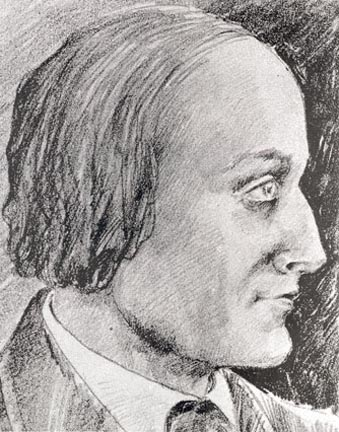
Cleng Peerson

Cleng Peerson (17 May 1783 – 16 December 1865) was a Norwegian emigrant to the United States; his voyage in 1824 was the precursor for the boat load of 52 Norwegian emigrants in the following year. That boat load was a precursor for the main wave of Norwegian immigration to the United States.

He was a Norwegian-American pioneer and "Slooper" who led the first group of Norwegians to emigrate to the United States, traveling on the Norwegian sloop Restauration.

== Legacy ==
- In 1947 and 1975, Cleng Peerson was featured on Norwegian postage stamps.
- During 1982, King Olav V of Norway visited Texas in recognition of the 200th anniversary of the birth of Cleng Peerson.
- Cleng Peerson Research Library and Cleng Peerson Institute are both located in Clifton, Texas.
- Tysvær municipality has announced plans for the Cleng Peerson Center.

== In literature ==
The True Saga Of Cleng Peerson are novels written by Alfred Hauge (translated by John Weinstock and Turid Sverre. foreword by Carl W. W. Sorenson. Special Projects Committee, Norwegian Society of Texas; 1982) about the life and times of Cleng Peerson. The three volume series were published in Norwegian between 1961 and 1965 by Gyldendal Norsk Forlag.

== Other sources ==
- De Pellis, Mario S. Cleng Peerson and the Cummunitarian Background of Norwegian Immigration (Norwegian-American Historical Association. Volume 2I: Page 136)
- Lovell, Odd S. (2015) Across the Deep Blue Sea: The Saga of Early Norwegian Immigrants (Minnesota Historical Society Press) ISBN 978-0873519618
