= Restauration (ship) =

19th-century Norwegian sloop; symbol of Norwegian immigration to the US

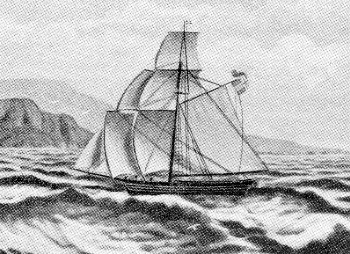

History

Sweden–Norway
- Name: Restauration
- Laid down: Hardanger
- Launched: 1801

General characteristics
- Type: Sloop
- Tonnage: 39 tons
- Length: 54 ft (16 m)
- Beam: 16 ft (4.9 m)

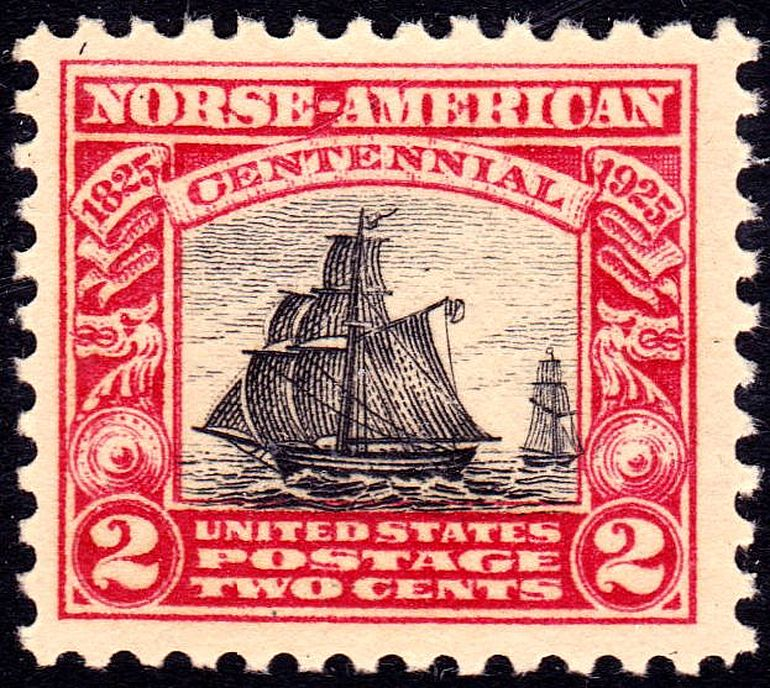
U.S. postage stamp featuring the ship Restauration issued in honor of the 100th anniversary of Norwegian immigration

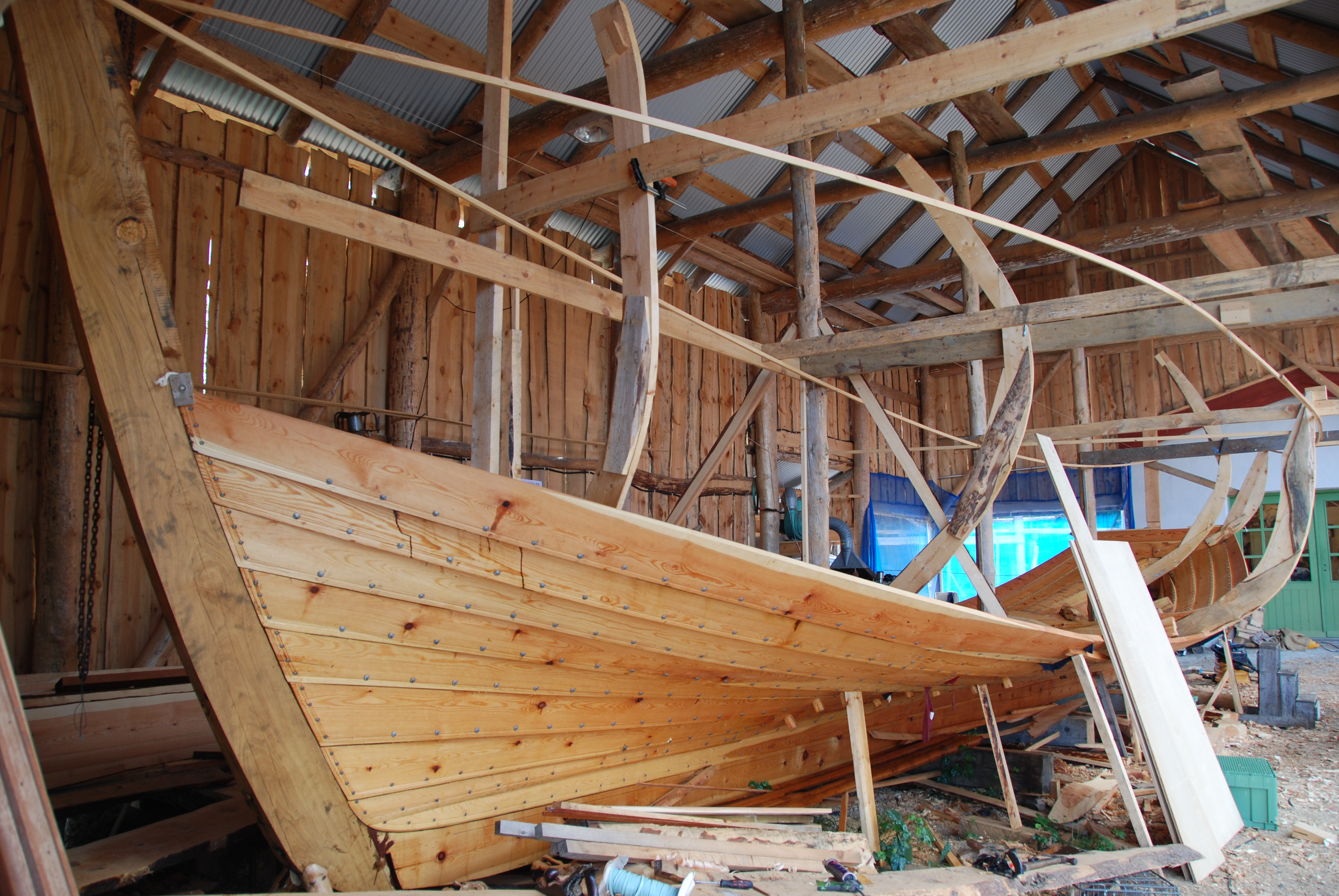
Replica of Restauration under construction at Finnøy, Norway

Restauration was a sloop built in 1801, in Hardanger, Norway. It became a symbol of Norwegian American immigration. Historical sources may contain several variations on the name of the sloop, including Restauration, Restoration, Restaurasjonen, and Restorasjon.

== History ==
On what is considered the first organized emigration from Norway to the United States, Restauration set sail from Stavanger on July 4, 1825, with 52 people aboard, many of them Norwegian Quakers. Probably many of this group belonged to a similar local movement, the Haugeans, a Lutheran sect which derived its name from Hans Nielsen Hauge. The group, led by Cleng Peerson, landed in New York City on October 9, 1825, after a three-month voyage. The voyage is described in Ole Rynning's Amerika-boka (The America Book, 1838).

For a vessel of her size Restauration had far more passengers on board than were allowed by American law. This resulted in a severe fine, confiscation of the ship and the arrest of the captain, L. O. Helland. The situation was solved when President John Quincy Adams pardoned the captain on 15 November, released him and the ship, and rescinded the fine. The people who made this voyage, who are sometimes referred to as the "Sloopers", moved onward to their first settlement in Kendall, Orleans County, New York.

== Recognition ==
The Norse-American Centennial was held in Minnesota on June 7–9, 1925, in commemoration of the 100th anniversary of the arrival of Restauration in New York City. The United States Post Office also issued two stamps to commemorate the 1825 arrival. The 2-cent stamp has for its central design a ship representing Restauration. The illustration on the two cent stamp is an artist's rendition of what Restauration probably looked like based on a drawing of its sister ship.

The 5-cent stamp has for its central design a Viking ship. This design is from a photograph of Viking which sailed from Norway to Chicago for the Columbian Exposition of 1893. The design on the 5-cent stamp was from a photograph of an exact size replica of Viking. A flag of the United States is seen waving from the bow of the ship. That ship was a replica of the Gokstad ship on display in the Viking Ship Museum in Oslo.

In 1975, in honor of the sesquicentennial of the arrival of Restauration, Cleng Peerson was depicted on a Norwegian NOK 1.40 postage stamp. The date of Leif Erikson Day in the United States was chosen to coincide with the day Restauration arrived in New York Harbor: October 9.

In preparation for the 2025 Bicentennial of the ship's voyage, a replica of the Restauration was built at Jørn Flesjå's small wooden shipyard at Finnøy Municipality in Ryfylke, Norway. The replica was launched in 2010 and is now used for education and charter excursions in Rogaland.. It will be sailed from Stavanger on July 4, 2025 and planned to arrive in New York Harbor on October 9, 2025. Also in October 2025, Mindekirken in Minneapolis will dedicate a model church ship of the Restauration to hang in the sanctuary.

== Related reading ==
- Haslam, Gerald Myron. 1984. Clash of Cultures: The Norwegian Experience with Mormonism, 1842–1920. New York: P. Lang.
- Seversike, Lester. The Prairie Lands of the Sloopers (Fox Valley Norwegian-American Sesquicentennial Association. 1975)
- Tjossem, Wilmer L. Quaker Sloopers: From the Fjords to the Prairies (Friends United Press. 1984)
