= Sheridan, Illinois =

Sheridan
- Village
- The Village of Sheridan
- Flag Seal
- Nickname: Gateway to The Lower Fox River Dells
- Location of Sheridan in LaSalle County, Illinois.
- Coordinates: 41°31′46″N 88°40′49″W
- Country: United States
- State: Illinois
- County: LaSalle
- Township: Mission, Northville
- Settled: 1830s
- Incorporated (village): 1872
- Founder: Rowe Family
- Named for: Gen. Philip Sheridan

Government
  - Type: Mayor and Village Board

Area
  - Total: 2.16 sq mi (5.59 km^{2})
  - Land: 2.12 sq mi (5.49 km^{2})
  - Water: 0.039 sq mi (0.10 km^{2})
- Elevation: 594 ft (181 m)

Population (2020)
  - Total: 2,431
  - Density: 1,146.4/sq mi (442.64/km^{2})
- Time zone: UTC-6 (CST)
  - Summer (DST): UTC-5 (CDT)
- ZIP code: 60551
- Area codes: 815, 779
- FIPS code: 17-69277
- GNIS feature ID: 2399800
- Website: www.sheridan-il.us

Sheridan is a village in LaSalle County, Illinois, United States. As of the 2020 census, the village's population was 2,431, up from 2,137 at the 2010 census. It is part of the Ottawa Micropolitan Statistical Area.

== History ==
=== The Village of Sheridan, Incorporated 1872 ===
The Village of Sheridan was settled as early as 1833 when Robert Rowe and his wife settled on Section 5 and 8 in what is now Mission Township. Prior to this, in 1826 Jesse Walker established a mission at the head of Mission Creek, just three miles from the present town of Sheridan. He became the first white settler in what is now Mission Township. In 1834, a Cholera Epidemic swept through the community, with a cemetery South of town near the present day prison as proof of this event. In 1844 Mission Point was established with the vote for a President and vice-president. Mission Point became known as Rowes Station in 1863, the Rowe farm consisted of three houses. Finally, in the summer of 1869 the village was platted and named Sheridan after General Phillip Sheridan. On June 24, 1872, the town of Sheridan voted forty-five to one to incorporate under the Old Statute of the State of Illinois. On June 29 of that same year, the first election of the board of trustees was held. The following seal was adopted: "Town Seal, Sheridan, Illinois. Incorporated, June 29, 1872". The township's first post office building actually resided on the property of a farm, located a mile east of town, off of E 2650th Road. The post office served the community until a Post Office was constructed in Sheridan, and the rest of the township was served either by the communities of Millington, Newark, Sheridan, Sandwich, or by rural routes.

As time progressed, the community grew, and the latter half of the 20th century saw expansive growth of local businesses, as there were a hardware store, two banks, a grocery store, two barber shops, two gas stations, three restaurants, and a tire center. However, over the subsequent years from 1995 to the present, many of the local businesses had either relocated or closed. Competition from nearby Ottawa, Sandwich, and Plano closed or diminished the ability to draw local residents to buying locally, resulting in local businesses having a hard time keeping business.

=== Flooding ===
In 1996, a flood occurred after a heavy rain storm drenched the valley, from Aurora down to Dayton, resulting in the low-lying area of Sheridan to flood, and most notably, Sheridan's "Old Mill Inn" became a popular spot for people to canoe from the bridge which came from town, to the Old Mill during the flood. In February 1998, the river flooded again after a rain storm failed to drain into the frozen ground. In 2008, the remnants of Hurricane Ike flooded the valley yet again. During the April 17–18, 2013 rain event, which flooded many bodies of water in the Chicago metropolitan area, the river and Somonauk Creek flooded, with much of the water level considerably diminished after it crested later that weekend. The river valley both north and west of Sheridan is somewhat confined by sandstone bluffs on either side, which forces the river to rise, resulting in higher river levels. The village itself is largely untouched, as a half-mile gap between the main area of town and the valley, coupled with two abandoned gravel quarry pits sitting within the gap, protects the town. The village also sits approximately 30 feet above the river.

== Geography ==
According to the 2021 census gazetteer files, Sheridan has a total area of 2.16 square miles (5.59 km^{2}), of which 2.12 square miles (5.49 km^{2}) (or 98.29%) is land and 0.04 square miles (0.10 km^{2}) (or 1.71%) is water.

The village lies at a bend in the Fox River where Somonauk Creek enters the river, and the Lower Fox River Dells start. It is used as both a launching and retrieval point for canoes going down the river. Canoes generally start upstream in Yorkville, and they generally exit at Ayers Landing, near the community of Wedron. The area of the village, and Mission Township where it sits, is defined by the river's distinct westward flow, which goes west, then south, then east, then south, and finally winds west again. The unincorporated area of the village resides within the flood plain and valley north of the village, and is within Northville Township while the village itself sits far back from the river, upon a sandstone bluff, which has been mined for sand and gravel. The village's "Rod and Gun Club" actually sits within one of the old open-pit mines between the village and the northern bridge.

== Demographics ==
Historical population
Census	Pop.	Note	%±
1880	442		—
1890	425		−3.8%
1900	485		14.1%
1910	506		4.3%
1920	476		−5.9%
1930	481		1.1%
1940	442		−8.1%
1950	476		7.7%
1960	704		47.9%
1970	724		2.8%
1980	719		−0.7%
1990	1,288		79.1%
2000	2,411		87.2%
2010	2,137		−11.4%
2020	2,431		13.8%
U.S. Decennial Census

=== 2020 census ===
As of the 2020 census, Sheridan had a population of 2,431. The median age was 35.2 years. 7.5% of residents were under the age of 18 and 5.5% were 65 years of age or older. For every 100 females, there were 507.8 males, and for every 100 females age 18 and over, there were 659.5 males age 18 and over.

0.0% of residents lived in urban areas, while 100.0% lived in rural areas.

There were 313 households in Sheridan, of which 27.8% had children under the age of 18 living in them. Of all households, 45.0% were married-couple households, 21.1% were households with a male householder and no spouse or partner present, and 24.9% were households with a female householder and no spouse or partner present. About 31.0% of all households were made up of individuals, and 11.2% had someone living alone who was 65 years of age or older.

There were 330 housing units, of which 5.2% were vacant. The homeowner vacancy rate was 1.3% and the rental vacancy rate was 4.3%.

Racial composition as of the 2020 census
Race	Number	Percent
White	1,183	48.7%
Black or African American	990	40.7%
American Indian and Alaska Native	3	0.1%
Asian	4	0.2%
Native Hawaiian and Other Pacific Islander	0	0.0%
Some other race	184	7.6%
Two or more races	67	2.8%
Hispanic or Latino (of any race)	245	10.1%

=== Income and poverty ===
The median income for a household in the village was $70,925, and the median income for a family was $76,979. Males had a median income of $59,167 versus $23,750 for females. The per capita income for the village was $11,121. About 8.9% of families and 13.2% of the population were below the poverty line, including 14.0% of those under age 18 and 19.0% of those age 65 or over.

=== Community ===
The community is also currently the home to a medium-security prison for the State of Illinois.

The community is served by the Sheridan Community Fire Department and Sheridan Police Department. The school district that serves the area is CUSD #2, which serves the Communities of Serena, Sheridan, Harding, Norway, and Baker; schools are only in Sheridan, Serena, and Harding, however, with the high school in Serena.

The mailing area of the community (the area with a Sheridan address) extends toward the communities of Newark, Millington, Norway, Serena, Somonauk, and Sandwich. Regarding to what reference is being consulted, the community of Norway and its environs are actually referred to as being Sheridan, or the nearby community of Serena.

== Government ==
=== Townships ===
The Village of Sheridan resides within two townships, Mission Township and Northville Township. The main area of town resides within Mission Township, while the periphery area of town extends to Northville Township in the north and west.

== Education ==
The village is covered by Community Unit School District #2, which is based out of neighboring Serena. The school district was formed by the combination of Sheridan, Serena, and Harding Schools. Currently, Serena High School is the only high school in the district, while there are three elementary schools in the three communities of the district. Serena High School is in the Little Ten Conference of the IHSA Athletic Program. Sheridan had a high school until 1939, when Sheridan High School was closed to combine with Serena and Harding. Sheridan High School was a member of the Little Ten Conference between 1930 until the formation of District 2. Serena has been a member of the Conference since 1939.

== Infrastructure ==
=== Health systems ===
Sheridan is served by two hospitals, Valley West Community Hospital, (formerly Sandwich Community Hospital, or SCH), run by Northwestern Medicine's regional division, KishHealth, which is located in Sandwich, some six miles away, and also by OSF Saint Elizabeth Medical Center, (formerly Ottawa Regional and Community Hospital of Ottawa, or CHO), which is run by OSF Healthcare. There are higher-level trauma centers located in Aurora and Peoria.

=== Transportation ===
The Illinois Railway runs through the center of town. Sheridan is near a State Highway, and two US Highways. Two County Highways (C. R. 32 and C. R. 3) run through town, and another (C. R. 2) is a mile to the west of town.

- U.S. Highway 34 six miles to the north
- U.S. Highway 52 four miles away to the south
- Illinois Route 71 six miles away, both to the south and to the east

== Notable people ==
- Silas Johnson, pitcher with several MLB teams; last pitcher to strike out Babe Ruth
- Ron Vandermeir Jr., racing driver, was born in Sheridan
