= Francis Beidler =

American lumber businessman (1854–1924)

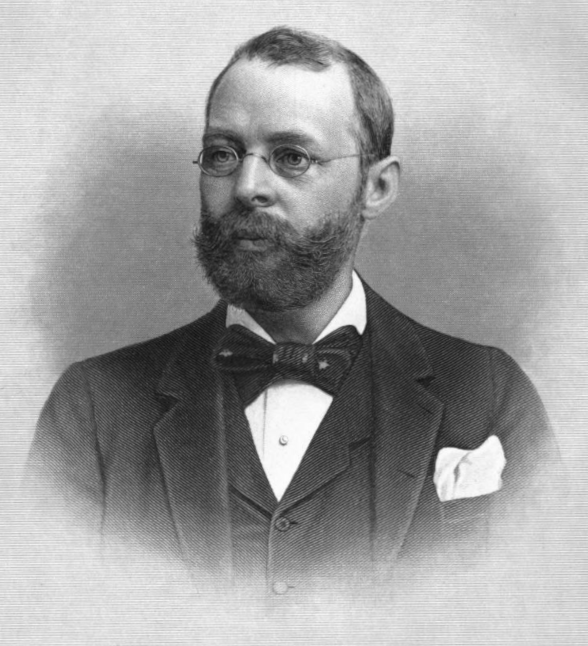
- Born: 1854; Chicago, Illinois, US
- Died: March 4, 1924 (aged 69); Chicago, Illinois, US
- Resting place: Rosehill Cemetery
- Occupation: Businessman

Francis Beidler (1854 – March 4, 1924), was a Chicago-based lumberman active in the first decades of the 20th century.

== Biography ==
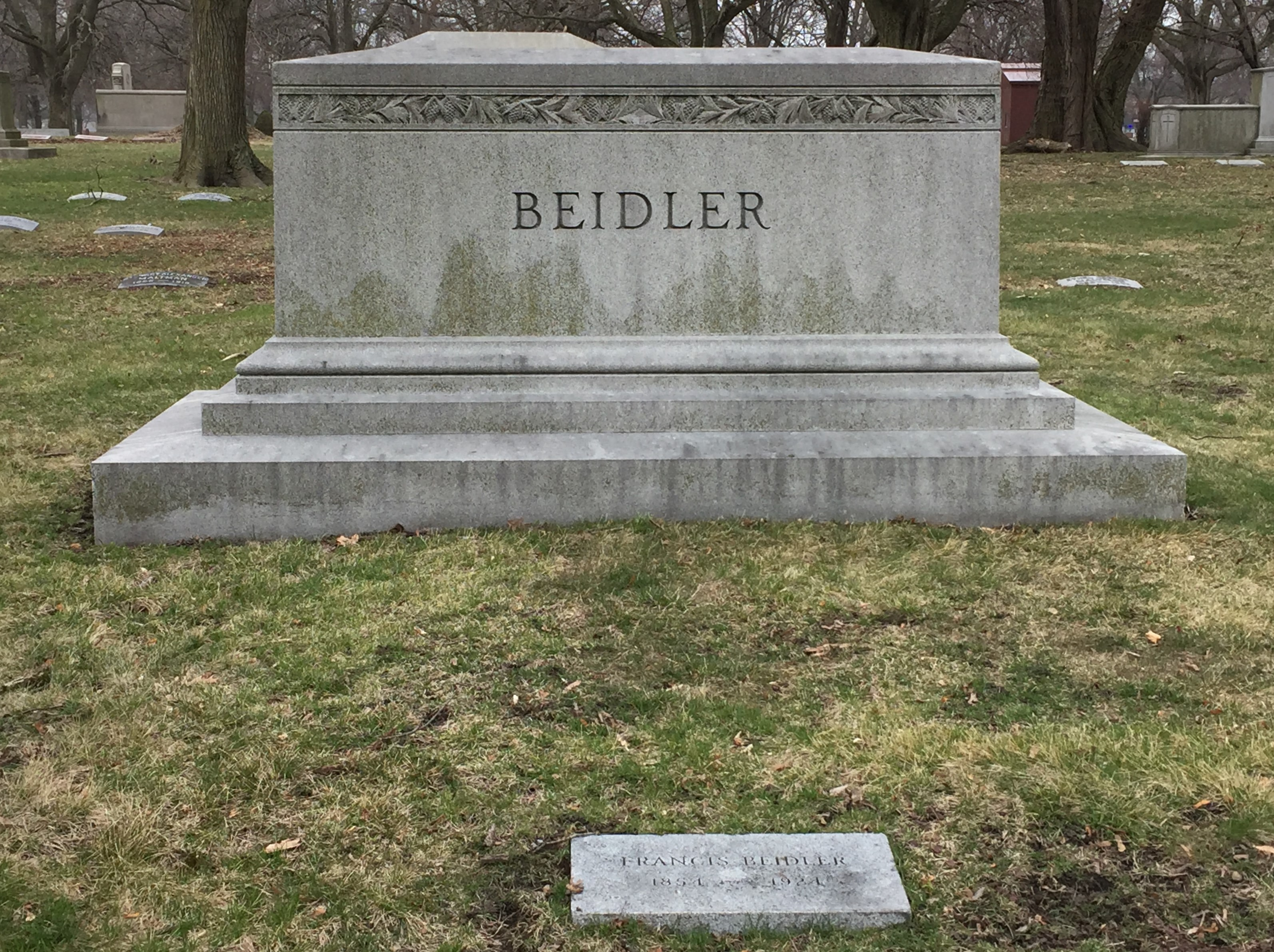
Beidler's grave at Rosehill Cemetery

Francis Beidler was born in Chicago in 1854. With partner Benjamin F. Ferguson, he was the co-founder and owner of the Santee River Cypress Lumber Company. Starting in 1881, the Santee Cypress Company purchased 165,000 acres (67,000 ha) of land in central South Carolina. The Company's holdings, which Beidler and Ferguson's personnel logged actively from 1881 onward, included large parcels of riverine bottomland in central South Carolina. The Beidler blackwater lands included large resources of valuable bald cypress timber. Beidler became the sole operating partner of the company after Ferguson's death in 1905.

Francis Beidler died at his home in Chicago on March 4, 1924, and was buried at Rosehill Cemetery.

== Legacy ==
The Santee Cypress operations were extremely profitable. Lands purchased for as little as $2.00/acre ($5.00/hectare) contained old-growth cypress trees as large as 20 feet (6.1 m) in circumference. A mill, located in nearby Ferguson, sawed up the logs cut from Beidler-owned blackwater properties. Many of the timbers located close to key rivers and adjacent "guts" (intermittent creeks) were cut down. However, not all of the timbers could be carried to the mill in this way. A nationwide economic downturn in 1913-1914 led to the suspension of Santee Cypress's logging operations. The Ferguson mill shut down in 1915.

=== National park ===
Beidler's 1915 order to his personnel to lay down their saws was a significant break point. It made possible the eventual preservation of two blackwater creek systems that lay within Santee Cypress-owned South Carolina property. The properties that make up today's Congaree National Park, near Columbia, and the Francis Beidler Forest, near Orangeburg, both trace their ownership through Beidler and the Santee Cypress Company. Both of these land parcels have since been enrolled on the Ramsar list of wetlands of international importance.

=== Foundation ===
Beidler used part of the fortune earned from the Santee River Cypress Lumber Company to bequeath $1.5 million (in 1924 USD) to the Illinois-based Francis Beidler Foundation. The Foundation remains active as of 2019. Credited donations include moneys paid to save and interpret the architecturally significant Glessner House in Chicago.
