= Fountain of Time =

Sculpture by Lorado Taft in Chicago

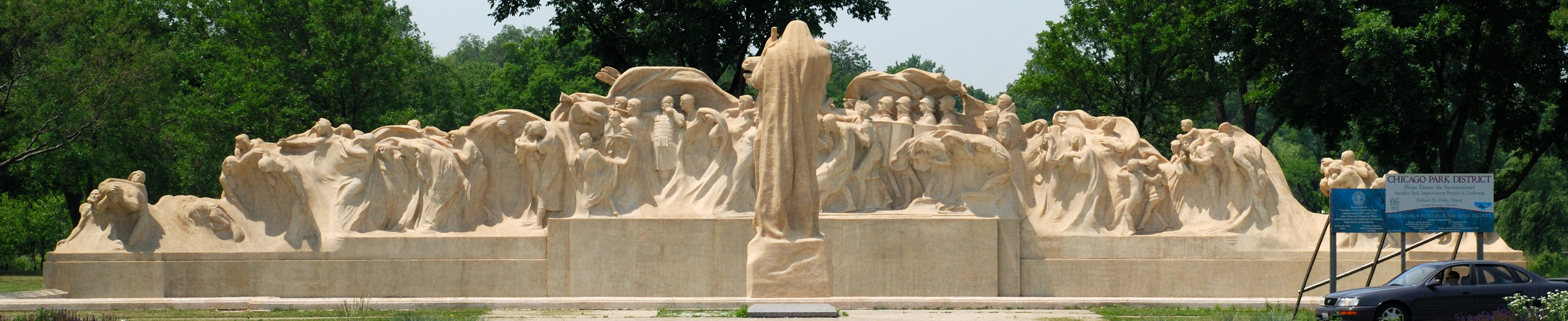
- Fountain of Time in southeast Washington Park at the western edge of the Midway Plaisance
- Artist: Lorado Taft
- Year: 1920, dedicated 1922
- Type: Concrete
- Dimensions: 7.3 m × 38.66 m × 7.16 m (24 ft × 126 ft 10 in × 23 ft 6 in)
- Location: Washington Park (outdoor), Chicago, Illinois; 41°47′12.3″N 87°36′27.9″W

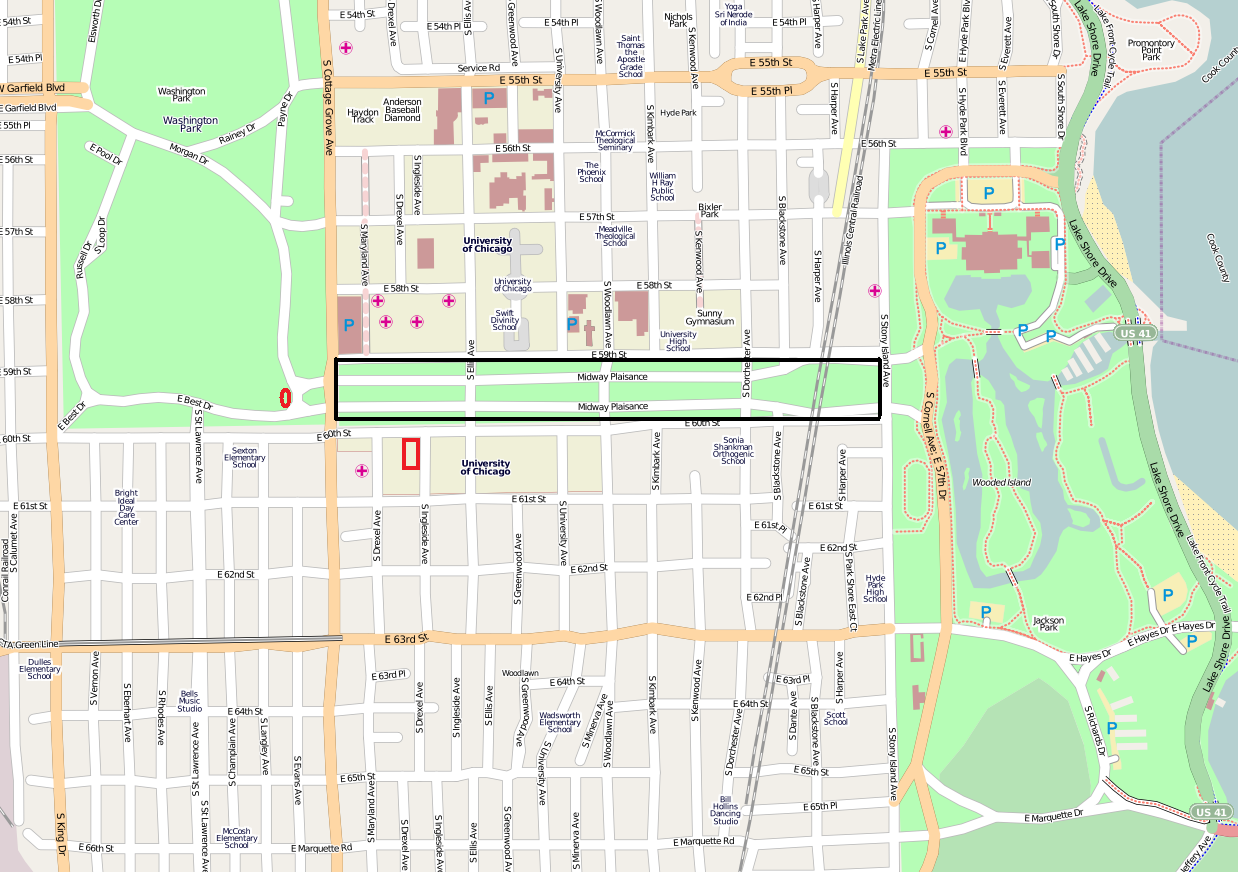
Map showing the Midway Plaisance (black rectangle) between Washington Park to the west (left) and Jackson Park. Fountain of Time (red oval) is located in the southeast portion of Washington Park immediately west of the Midway Plaisance. Lorado Taft Midway Studios (red rectangle) is located just south of the Midway Plaisance. (Chicago Park District in green, University of Chicago in yellow background)

Fountain of Time, or simply Time, is a sculpture by Lorado Taft, measuring 126 feet 10 inches (38.66 m) in length, situated at the western edge of the Midway Plaisance within Washington Park in Chicago, Illinois, in the United States. The sculpture is inspired by Henry Austin Dobson's poem "Paradox of Time". Its 100 figures passing before Father Time were created as a monument to the 100 years of peace between the United States and the United Kingdom following the Treaty of Ghent in 1814. Father Time faces the 100 from across a water basin. The fountain's water was turned on in 1920, and the sculpture was dedicated in 1922. It is a contributing structure to the Washington Park United States Registered Historic District, which is a National Register of Historic Places listing.

Part of a larger beautification plan for the Midway Plaisance, Time was constructed from a new type of molded, steel-reinforced concrete that was claimed to be more durable and cheaper than alternatives. It was said to be the first of any kind of finished work of art made of concrete. Before the completion of Millennium Park in 2004, it was considered the most important art installation in the Chicago Park District. Time is one of several Chicago works of art funded by Benjamin Ferguson's trust fund.

Time has undergone several restorations because of deterioration and decline caused by natural and urban elements. During the late 1990s and the first few years of the 21st century it underwent repairs that corrected many of the problems caused by these earlier restorations. Although extensive renovation of the sculpture was completed as recently as 2005, the supporters of Time continue to seek resources for additional lighting, and the National Trust for Historic Preservation has nominated it for further funding.

== Planning ==
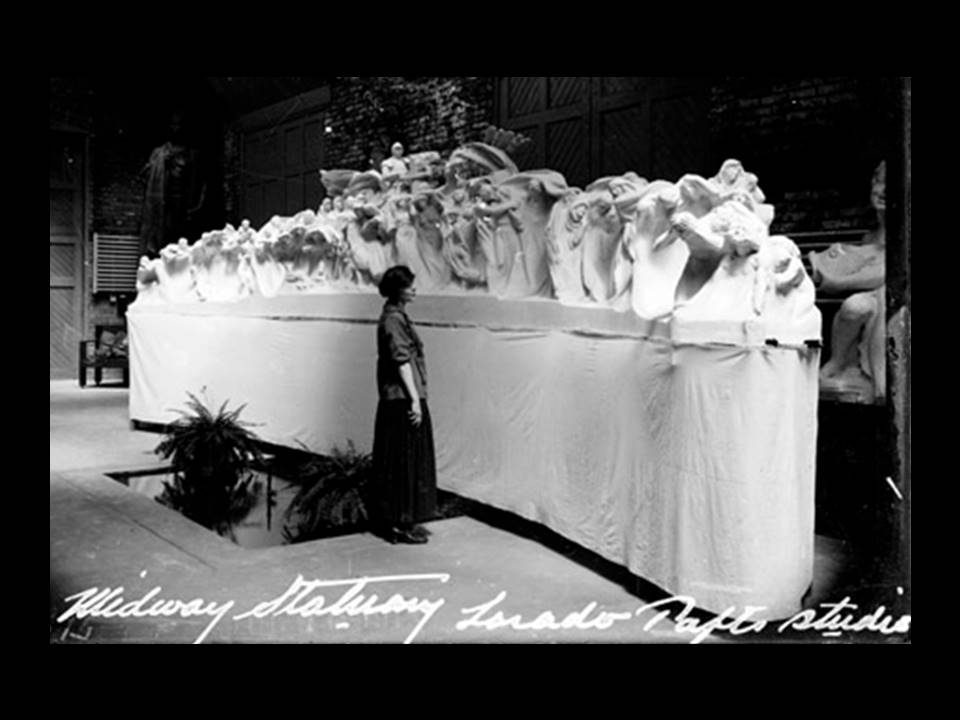
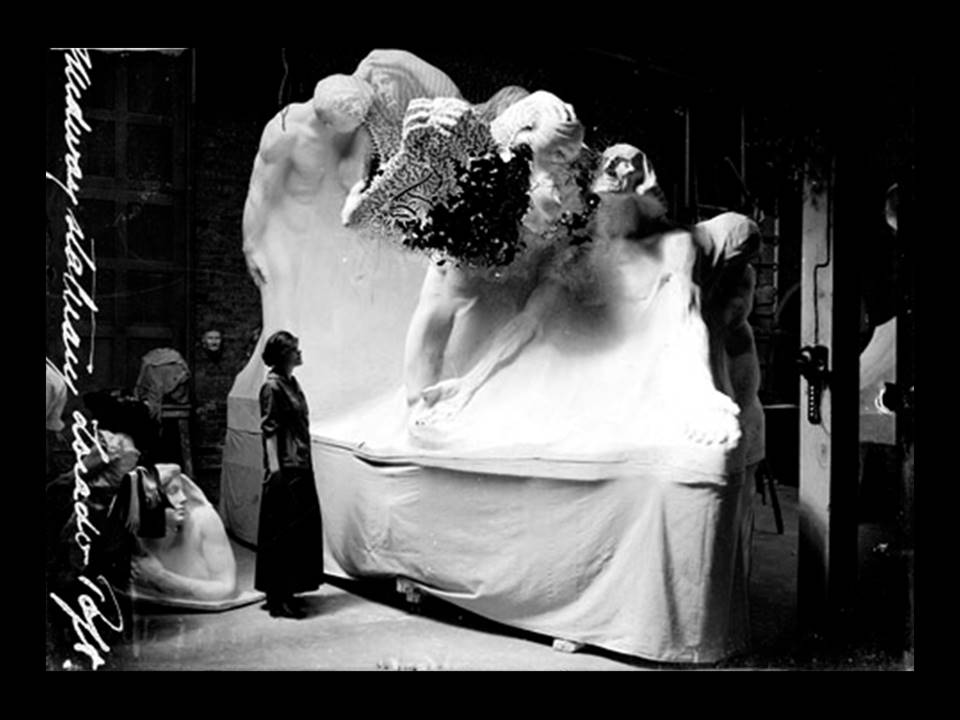
Fountain of Time in Lorado Taft Midway Studios in 1915

Time, along with many other public works in Chicago, was funded by Benjamin Ferguson's 1905 gift of $1 million ($35.8 million today), to a charitable trust formed to "memorialize events in American History". Lorado Taft initially conceived a sculpture carved from granite; an alternative plan was to have it chiseled out of Georgia marble, which it is estimated would have cost $30,000 ($977,273) a year for five years. The planned work was intended as part of a Midway beautification which was to include a stream, lagoons, and a series of bridges: a Bridge of Arts at Woodlawn Avenue, a Bridge of Religion at the intersection of Ellis Avenue, and a Bridge of Science at Dorchester Avenue (formerly Madison Avenue). As part of the plan, the two ends of the Midway were to be connected by a canal in the deep depressions linking lagoons in Jackson and Washington Parks.

Make no little plans; they have no magic to stir men's blood, and probably themselves will not be realized. Make big plans: aim high in hope and work ...

— Daniel Burnham

In 1907, Taft had won the first commission from the Ferguson Fund, to create the Fountain of the Great Lakes at the Art Institute of Chicago. Immediately afterwards, inspired by Daniel Burnham's "Make no little plans" quote, he began lobbying for a grand Midway beautification plan. In 1912, Art Institute trustee Frank G. Logan formally presented Taft's plans to the fund's administrators at the Art Institute of Chicago. Taft's proposed Midway Plaisance beautification plan included two possible commemoration themes. His first choice was to honor the memory of the World's Columbian Exposition that had been held in Jackson Park in 1893. His alternative was to commemorate the centennial of the 1814 Treaty of Ghent "marking a century of perfect understanding between England and America". Since other plans to commemorate the Exposition were under way, the second theme choice was adopted as the justification for a second Taft commission from the Ferguson Fund. Contemporary newspaper accounts anticipated that Taft's entire Midway beautification plan would be approved easily.

Taft's initial commission from the trust was limited to the creation of a full-sized plaster model of Fountain of Time, under a five-year $10,000 ($325,758) annual installment contract signed on February 6, 1913. This would enable the model to be evaluated in 1918. Taft first created a 20-foot (6.1 m) quarter-scale model which received the Trustees' approval in May 1915. He eventually produced his full-scale plaster model, 100 feet (30.5 m) in width peaking in the center, with an equestrian warrior and a robed model of Father Time with a height of 20 feet (6.1 m). The installation of this model near its intended location was delayed by Taft's World War I service with the Y.M.C.A. in France as part of a corps of entertainers and lecturers, but was completed in 1920. However, Taft's wider vision of a Chicago school of sculpture, analogous to other philosophical Chicago schools such as the contemporaneous Chicago school of architecture style, had lost momentum after the 1913 dedication of his Fountain of the Great Lakes. The Beaux Arts style had become dated; instead of funding Taft's large-scale Midway Plaisance beautification plan, and providing the originally planned granite, bronze or Georgia marble materials, the trust only allocated sufficient funds and support for a concrete sculpture.

== Location and installation ==
Fountain of Time under construction
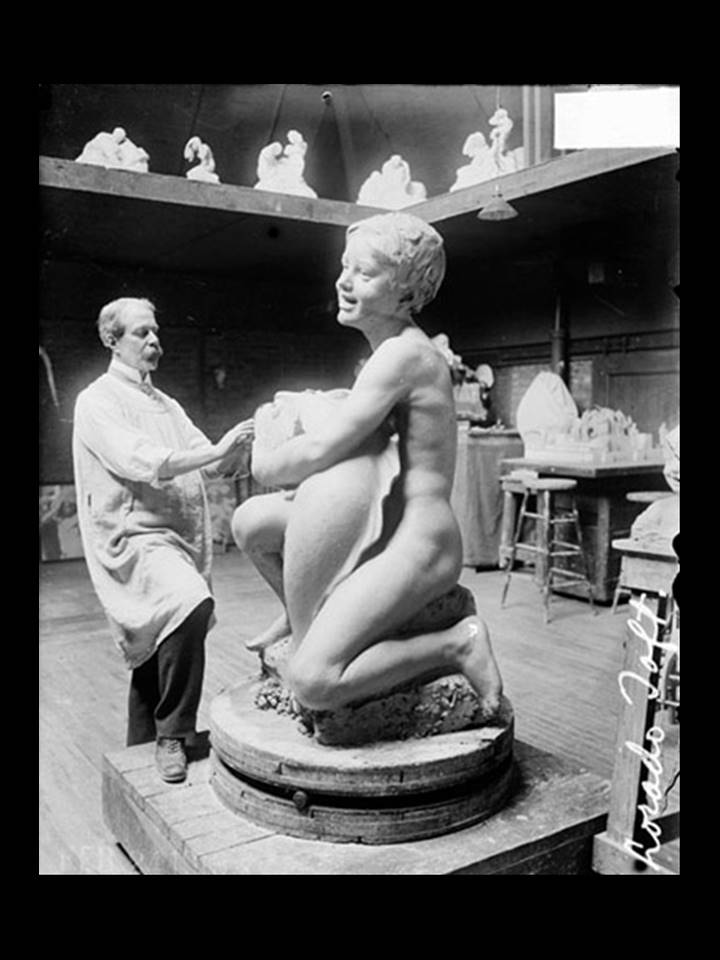
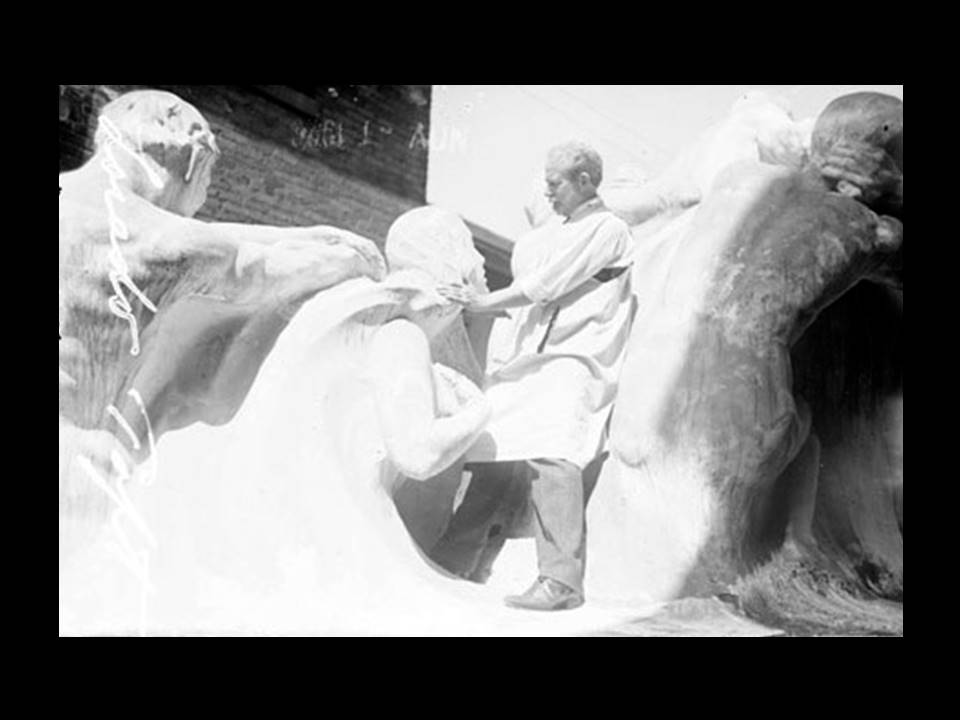
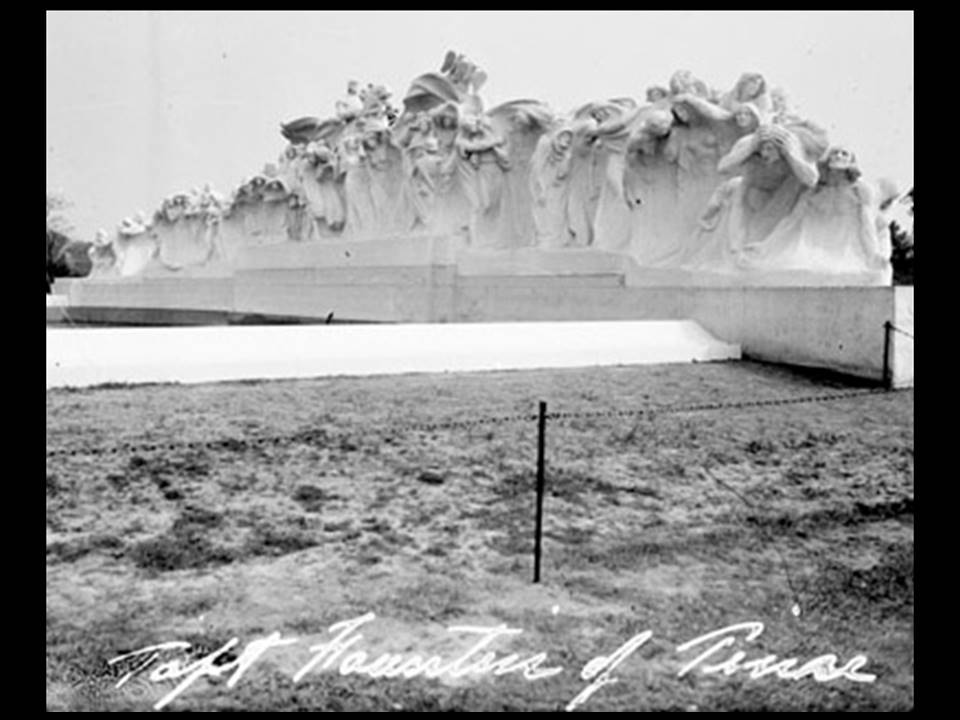
left: Taft at work in Lorado Taft Midway Studios (1913); center: Taft standing on Time (1920); right: Fountain of Time around the time of its completion (1920)

Time is in the Chicago Park District, in the Washington Park community area on Chicago's South Side, near the Midway Plaisance. This location, adjoining the University of Chicago campus directly to the East, makes the sculpture a contributing structure to the Washington Park federal Registered Historic District, listed on the National Register of Historic Places. Time is considered to be the most important piece of monumental art in the Park District, which hosts over 100 art works. Its importance stems from its sculptor, its message, the era in which it was created, and the design of its reflecting pool by Howard Van Doren Shaw. Robert Jones, director of design and construction for the Art Institute of Chicago at the time, stated in 1999 that Time was the first finished art piece to be made of any type of concrete.

The sculpture is located a few blocks from Taft's studio, the Lorado Taft Midway Studios, now a Chicago Landmark and National Historic Landmark, located at 60th Street and Ingleside Avenue. Other notable sculptures nearby include Henry Moore's National Historic Landmark Nuclear Energy, which is on the site of the first self-sustaining nuclear reaction at the University of Chicago. Jackson Park, connected to Washington Park and Time by the Midway Plaisance, hosts the Chicago Landmark Statue of The Republic; at one time the Midway Plaisance, Jackson Park and Washington Park were jointly known as "South Park".

There is little agreement on the dimensions of Time, with various sources describing it as between 102 and 127 feet (31.1 and 38.7 m) long. One of the few precise estimates describes it as 126 feet 10 inches (38.7 m) long, 23 feet 6 inches (7.2 m) wide and 24 feet (7.3 m) tall. The sources are often unclear about whether they are describing the width of the reflecting pool from exterior wall to exterior wall, the width of the water within the reflecting pool's interior walls, the width of the base of the sculpted mass of humanity, the width of the sculpted masses themselves, or the width of the parcel of land upon which Time is built.

Water began running in the completed sculpture on September 1, 1920, although it was not dedicated to the city until November 15, 1922. University of Chicago President Harry Pratt Judson delivered an address at the dedication ceremony at the Midway Plaisance, before contributions from Taft, President of the B.F. Ferguson Trust Charles Hutchinson, and John Barton Payne, President of the South Park Board.

== Design and realization ==
Post-restoration Fountain of Time

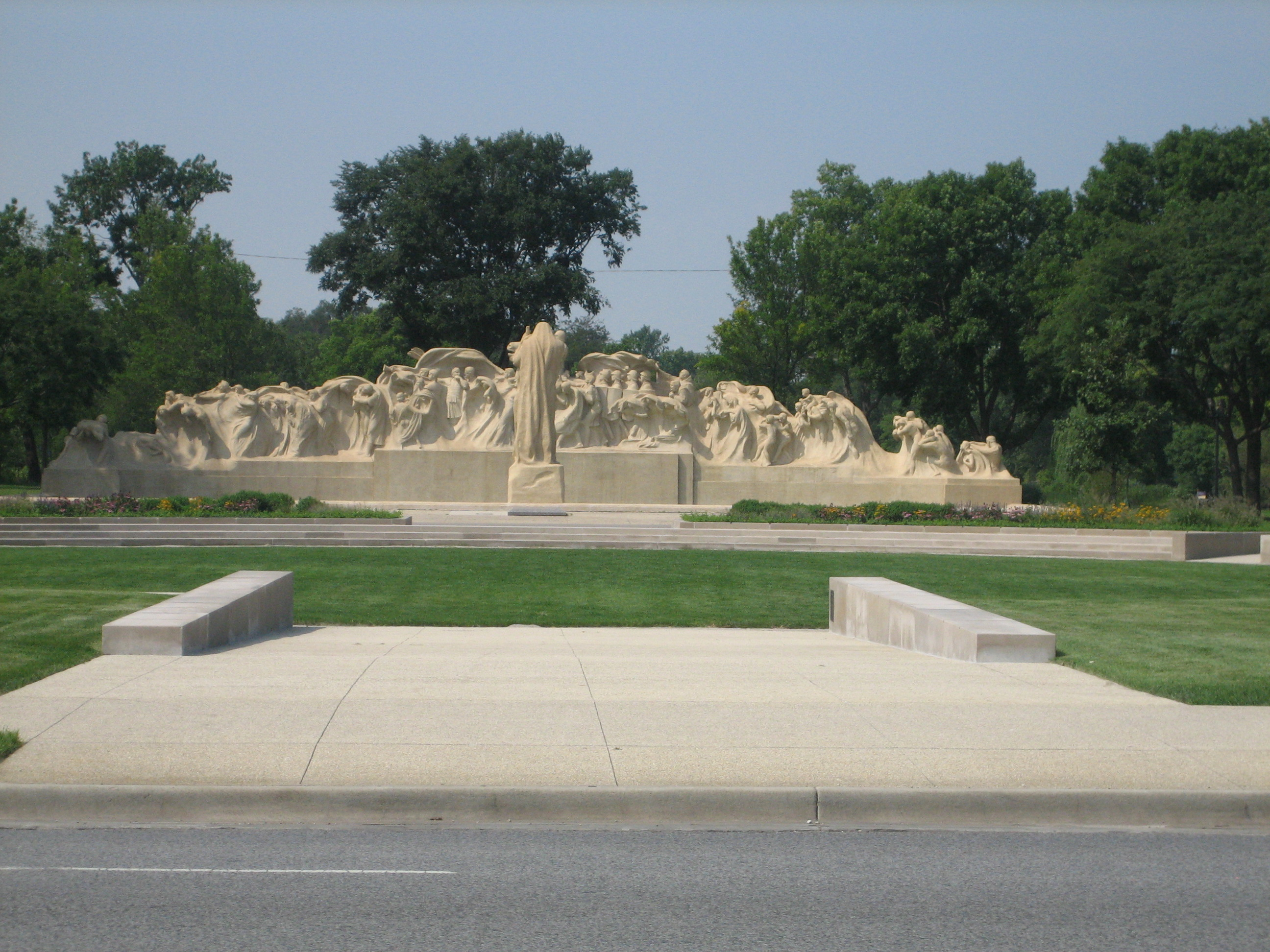
View from the east

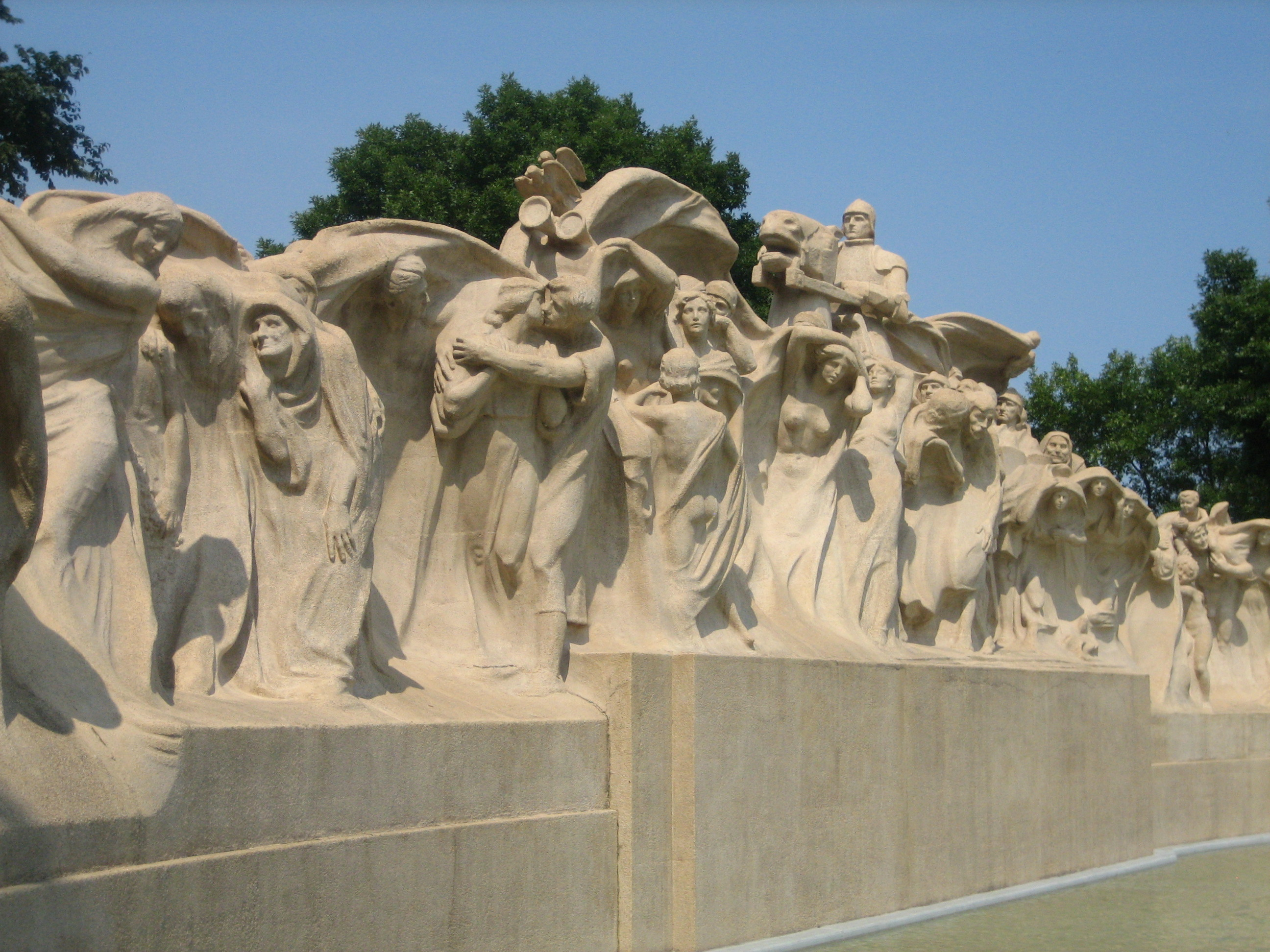
View of mass of humanity from the front of the middle south portion

The sculpture is made of a form of hollow-cast concrete, reinforced with steel. It was cast in a 4,500-piece mold, using 250 short tons (230 t) of a material described as "concrete-like", which incorporated pebbles from the Potomac River. This composite material was an innovation at the time. For years, John Joseph Earley of Washington, DC, had used pebbles that seemed durable in the face of elements such as the weather and urban soot and grime. He had determined that by adding crushed pebbles he could create a new concrete mixture more durable than limestone but cheaper than marble or bronze. The reflection from the silica of the crushed stones complemented the durability with artistic beauty; the same material was used at Chicago's Fine Arts Building.

The sculpture depicts a hooded Father Time carrying a scythe, and watching over a parade of 100 figures arranged in an ellipse, with an overall pyramidal geometry. The allegorical procession depicts the entire spectrum of humanity at various stages of life. The contemporary 1920s Chicago Daily Tribune described the figures as "heroic", and that choice of adjective has stayed with the piece. The figures are said to be passing in review as they rush through the stages of life, and include soldiers, frolicking children and kissing couples. Father Time is described in various newspaper articles as "huge", "weird", and "dominant". Other Tribune critics described Time as a "pet atrocity" of Taft in large part due to its ugliness. One critic described the white figures as reminiscent of false teeth smiling across the end of the Midway.

Time commemorates the first 100 years of peace between the United States and Great Britain after the Treaty of Ghent concluded the War of 1812 on December 24, 1814. The design was inspired by the poem "Paradox of Time" by Henry Austin Dobson: "Time goes, you say? Ah no, Alas, time stays, we go". Time's theme has been compared to Shakespeare's All the world's a stage monologue in As You Like It, which describes the seven ages of man: infant, schoolboy, lover, soldier, justice, old age, and dementia. Taft's figures represent birth, the struggle for existence, love, family life, religion, poetry, and war.

Although most of the figures are generic representations of human forms in various walks and stages of life, Taft included himself, with one of his assistants following him, along the west side of the sculpture. He is portrayed wearing a smock, with his head bowed and hands clasped behind his back. His daughters served as models for some of the figures.

Taft is remembered for his books, such as The History of American Sculpture (1903), regarded as the first comprehensive work on the subject, and was well known for portraits and allegorical public sculpture, of which Fountain of Time is a prime example. It was produced in the period following his assignment to design sculptures for William Le Baron Jenney's 1893 Horticultural Building for the World's Columbian Exposition. During this period he designed several large-scale public works, including Fountain of the Great Lakes. Taft resided in Illinois for most of his life and worked in the Midway Studios starting in 1906.

== Restoration ==
Lorado Taft self-portrait
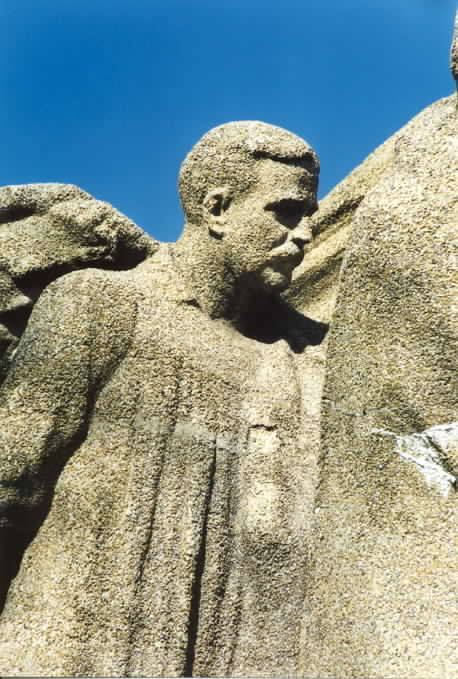
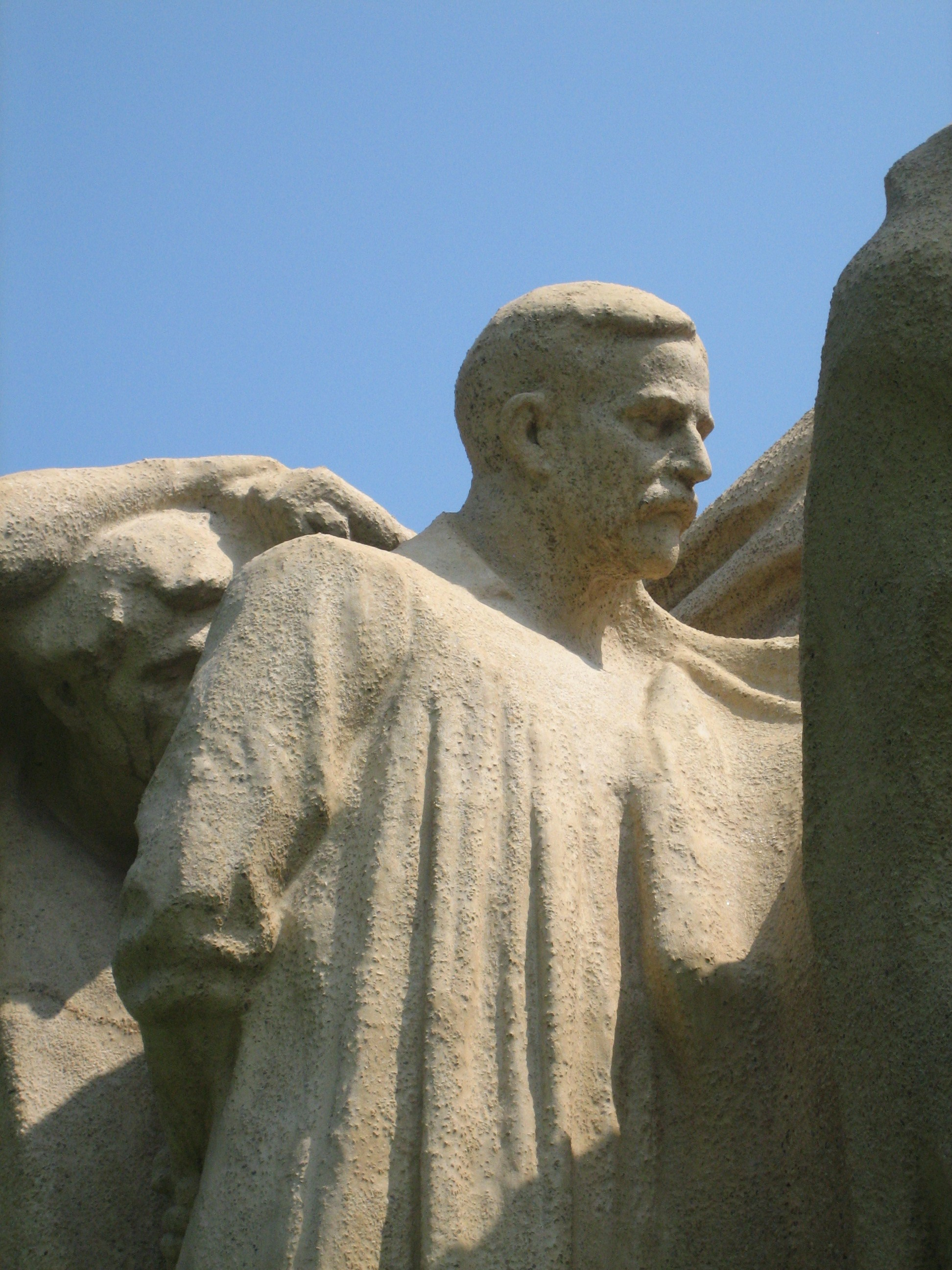
A self-depiction of the fountain sculptor, Lorado Taft, that is among the mass of humanity is shown before (left) and after (right) restoration.

Designed without expansion joints, Time is one of a small number of outdoor sculptures made of reinforced pebble/concrete aggregate, few of which have been created since the 1930s. In 1936, Time's weather-related cracks were repaired; further work occurred in 1955. The sculpture's subsequent repairs were followed by a rededication celebration in 1966. Although the sculpture received regular maintenance, early repair crews often did more harm than good, by using techniques such as sandblasting and patching cracks with rigid materials.

By the 1980s the sculpture was crumbling; cracks had developed, details of the figures had worn away, and moisture had eroded the internal structure. In wintertime the fountain had to be protected by a tarp. Weather, air pollution, and vandalism meant that hundreds of thousands of dollars were now needed for restoration. The Chicago Park District, University of Chicago, and Art Institute of Chicago conservators all sponsored restoration work, including drying out the cavity of the hollow sculpture, removal of the deteriorated substructure, a newly designed ventilation system within the piece, a protective exterior coating, and repairs to the reflecting pool. In 1989 Chicago Park District allocated $150,000 to the repair project, which amount was matched by the Ferguson fund. By the end of 1991, the Park District had collected $320,000 of the $520,000 estimated repair costs from public and private funds, although in 1994 the sculpture still awaited repair.

Father Time
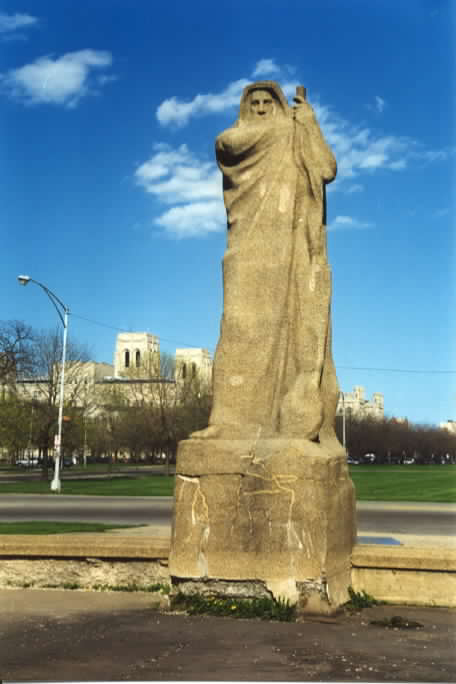
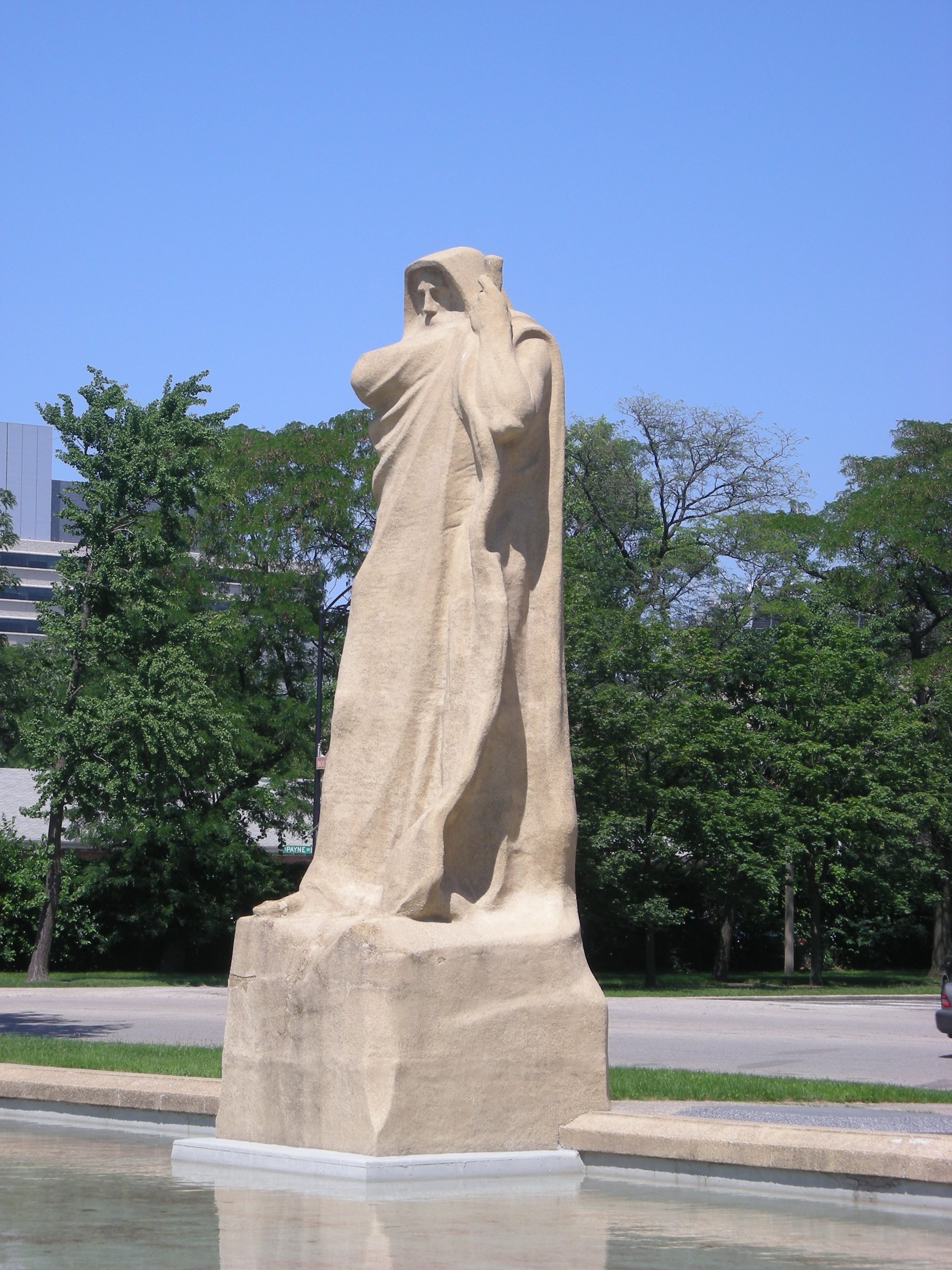
Father Time stands at the eastern edge of the fountain, shown before (left) and after (right) restoration.

By early 1997, after almost two decades of activity, the only repairs completed were phase one of the air ventilation system to dehumidify the hollow base, the drainage pipes and a new inner roof. Plans now included the erection of a temporary two-story metal building to protect all but the giant Father Time from the harsh winters and to facilitate year-round repair; the reinforcement of corroded steel interior portions; the replacement of inconsistent patches; the substitution of engineered spacing for natural cracks, and finally, hand-brushed concrete recoating. The temporary building was budgeted at $270,000; the city spent a total of $450,000 on repairs approved by the Park District that year.

On April 19, 1999, the $1.6 million, two-year phase two restoration began, scheduled for completion by May 2001. Five workers began repairing the cracks, killing biological growth, removing calcium deposits and pollution-blackened gypsum, and coating the 10,000-square-foot (930 m^{2}) surface with a combination of lime putty, adobe cement and sand. The inoperable reflecting pool was not repaired in this phase. Although this phase was completed in 2001, its effects were not visible until the following year, when the temporary protective structure was unveiled. The repairs were expected to sustain the sculpture for about 30 to 50 years before any further repairs would be necessary.

In 2003, the National Endowment for the Arts committed $250,000 to the Park District for the conservation and restoration of the reflecting pool. In 2004, the University of Chicago contributed $100,000 and the Park District Board $845,000 to repair the pool and its water circulation system. This work was carried out in the summer of 2005 at a slightly reduced budget, and the fountain was filled with water for the first time in over fifty years. In 2007, efforts began to add lighting. That same year the sculpture was nominated by Partners in Preservation, a fund for the preservation of historic sites, backed by the National Trust for Historic Preservation and American Express. In a widely publicized contest that included open house events where the public could tour and learn about the competing historic sites, $1 million was available for preservation efforts in the Chicago metropolitan area, but the fountain was not one of the 15 winning candidates.

== Gallery ==
Fountain of Time before restoration

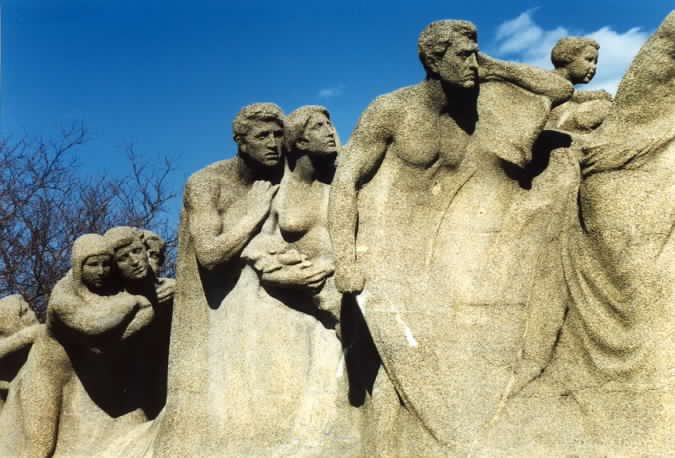
Front south

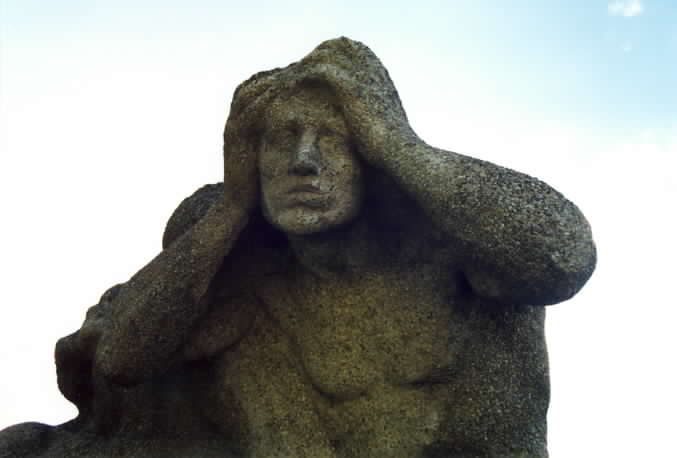
Front isolation

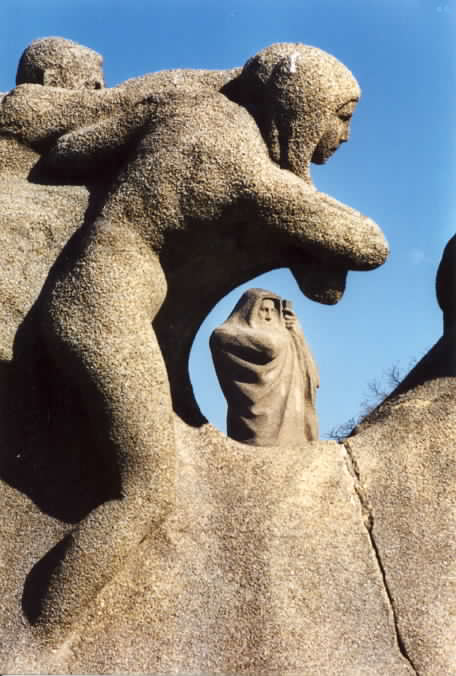
Front isolation

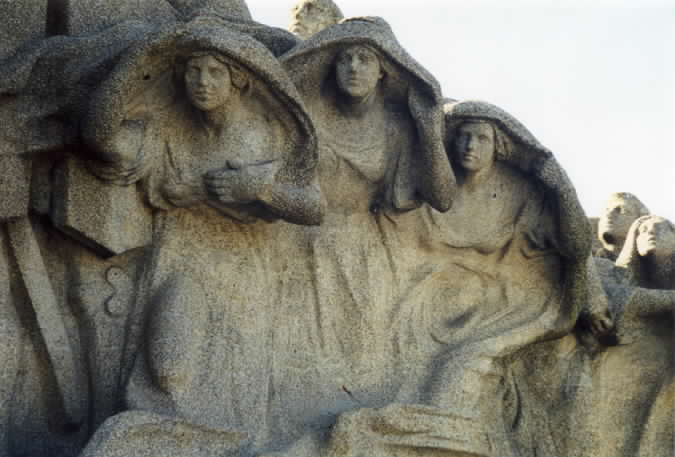
Front north center

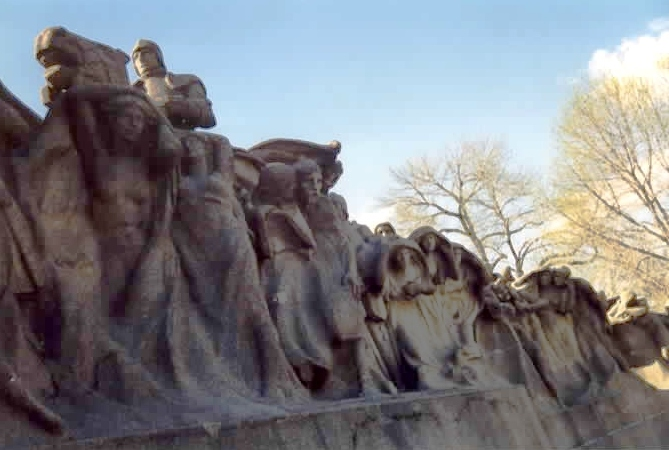
Front north
Fountain of Time after restoration

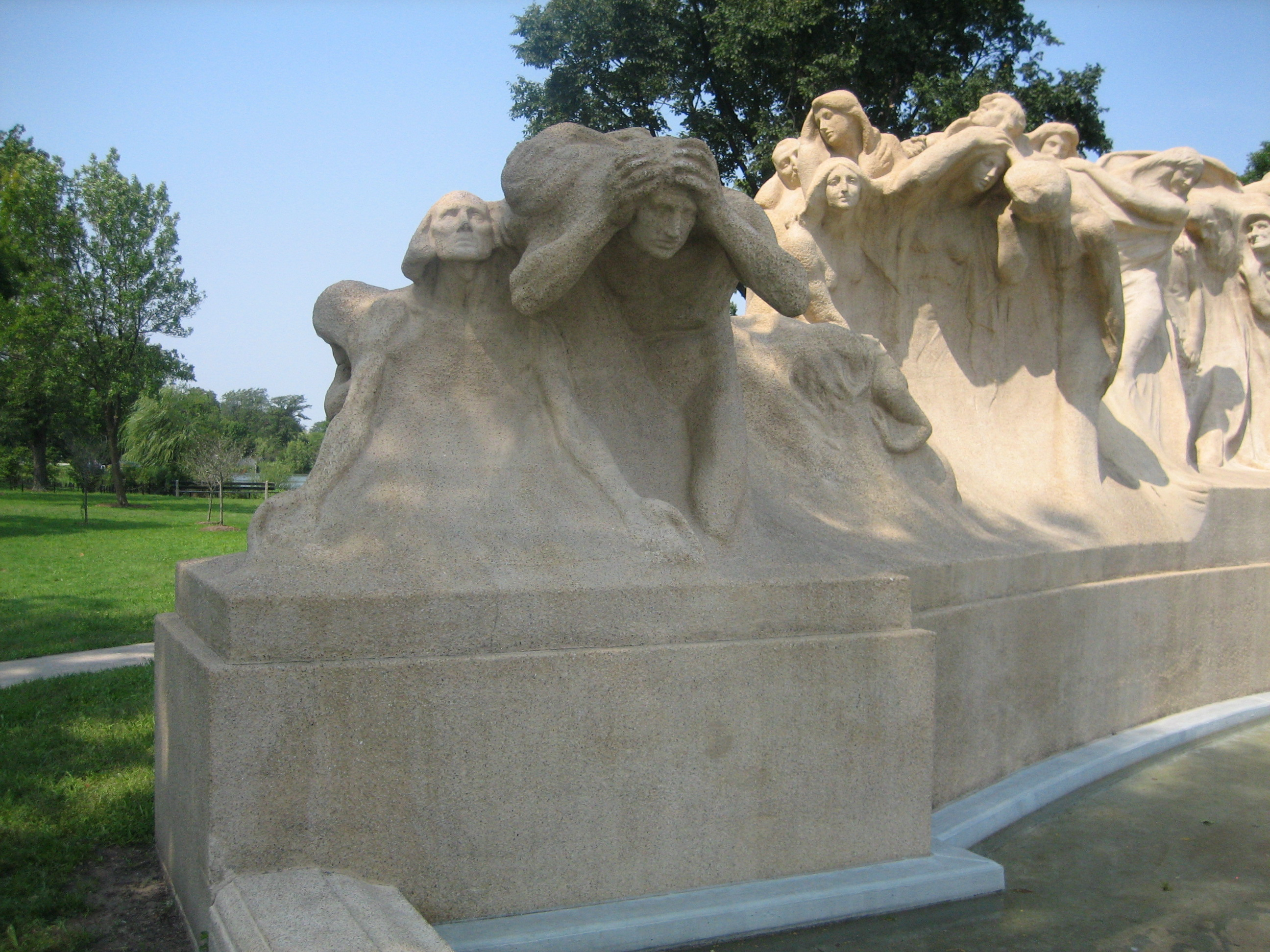
Front south

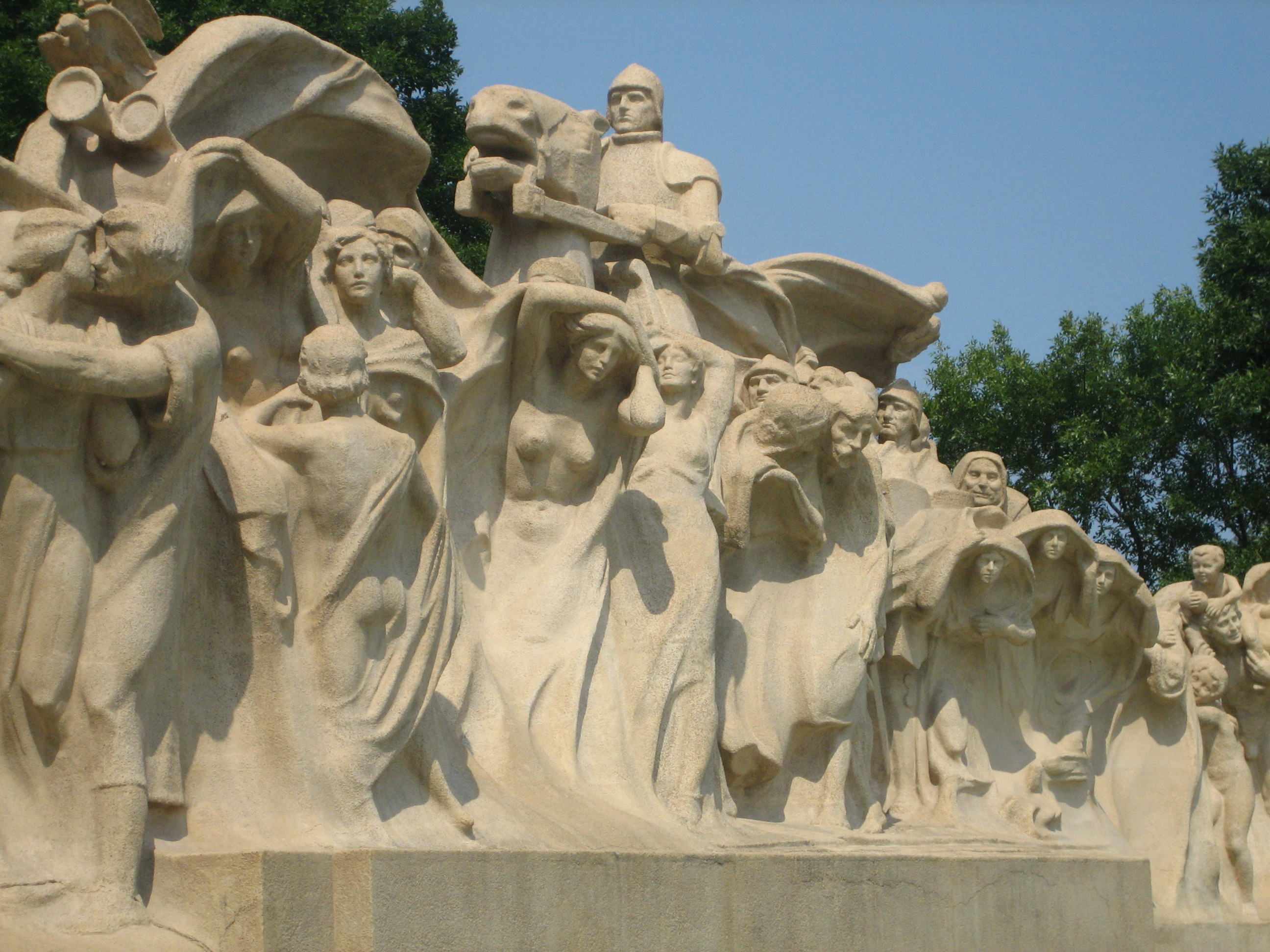
Front center

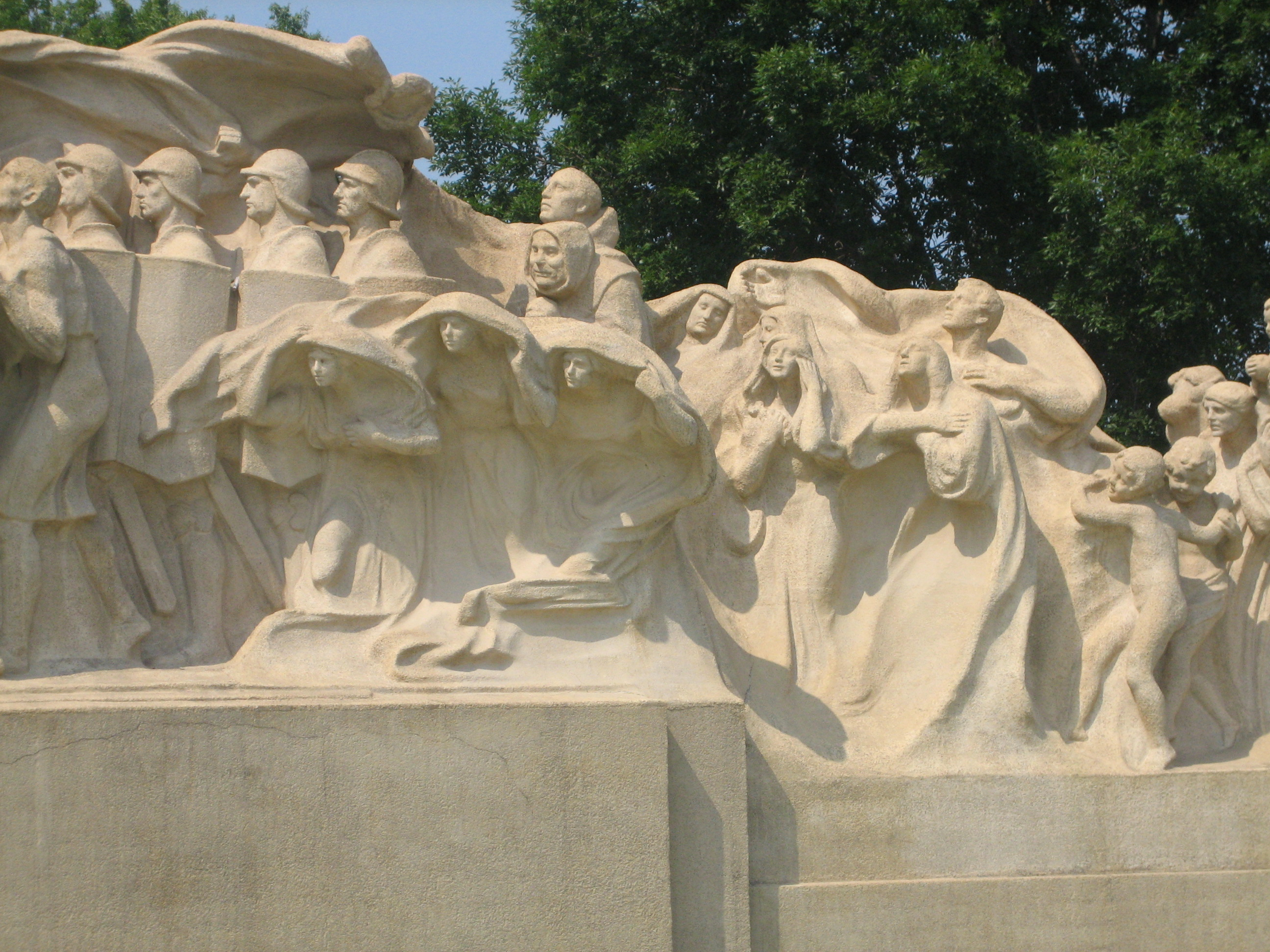
Front north center

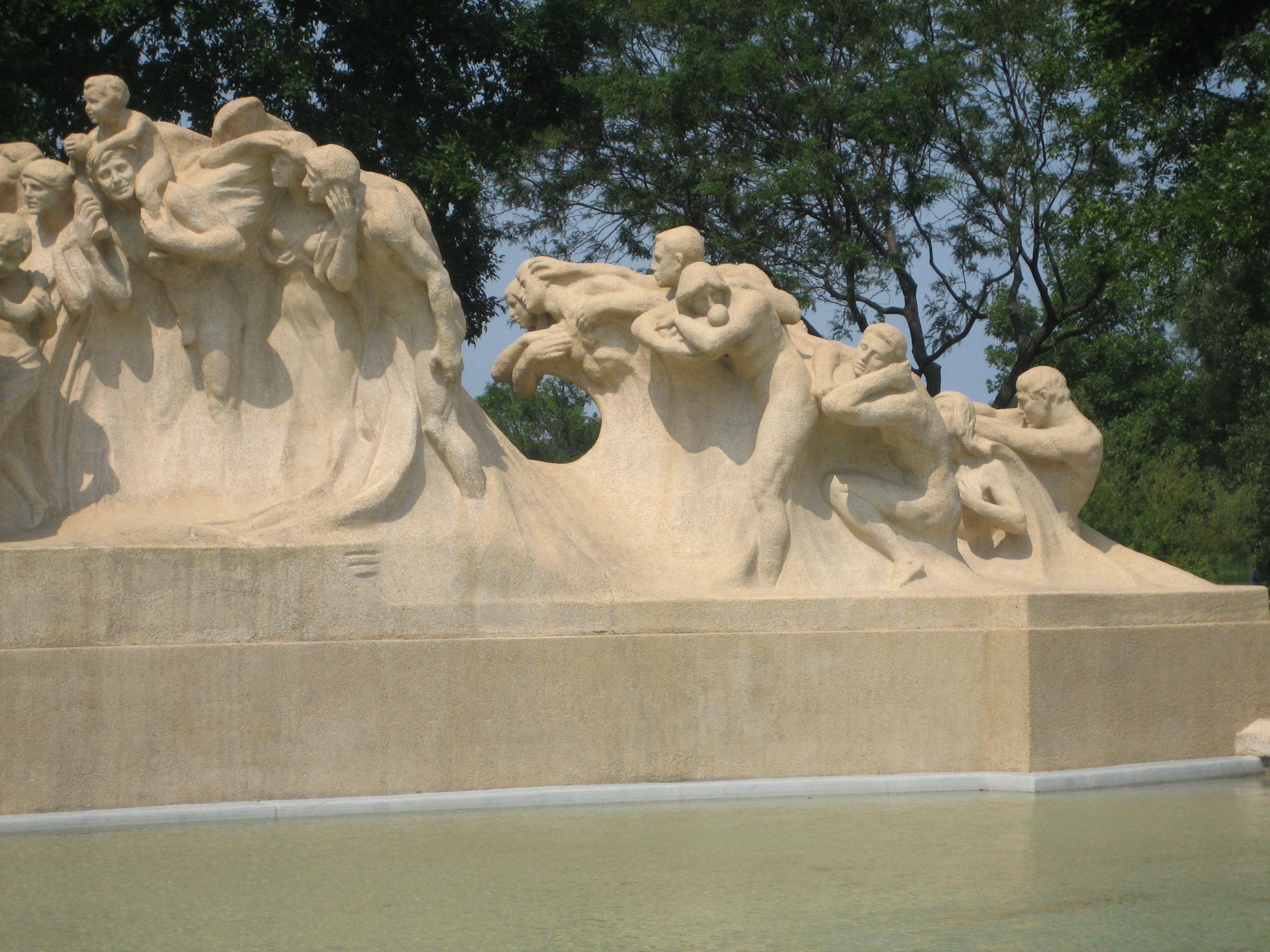
Front north

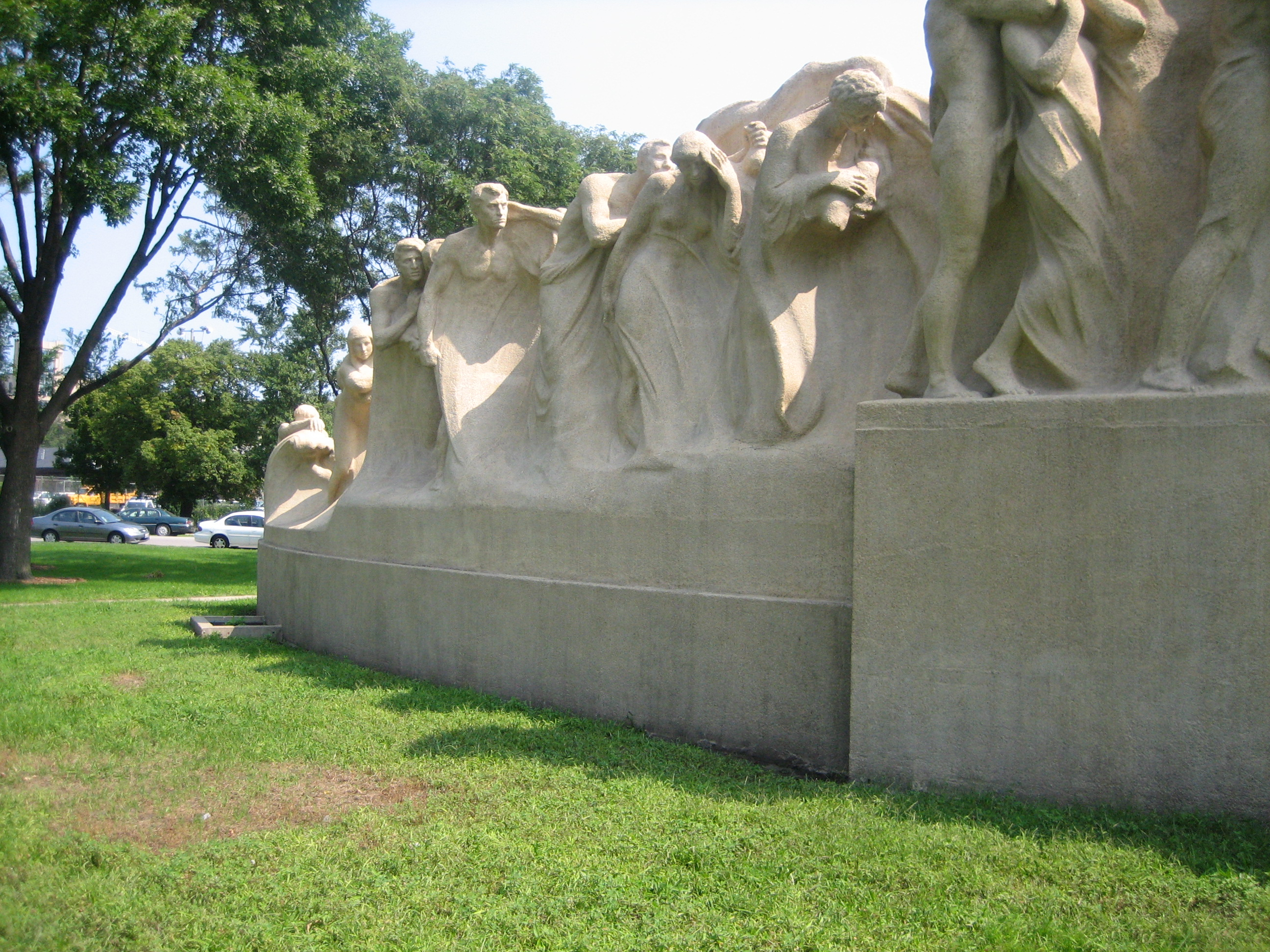
Rear north

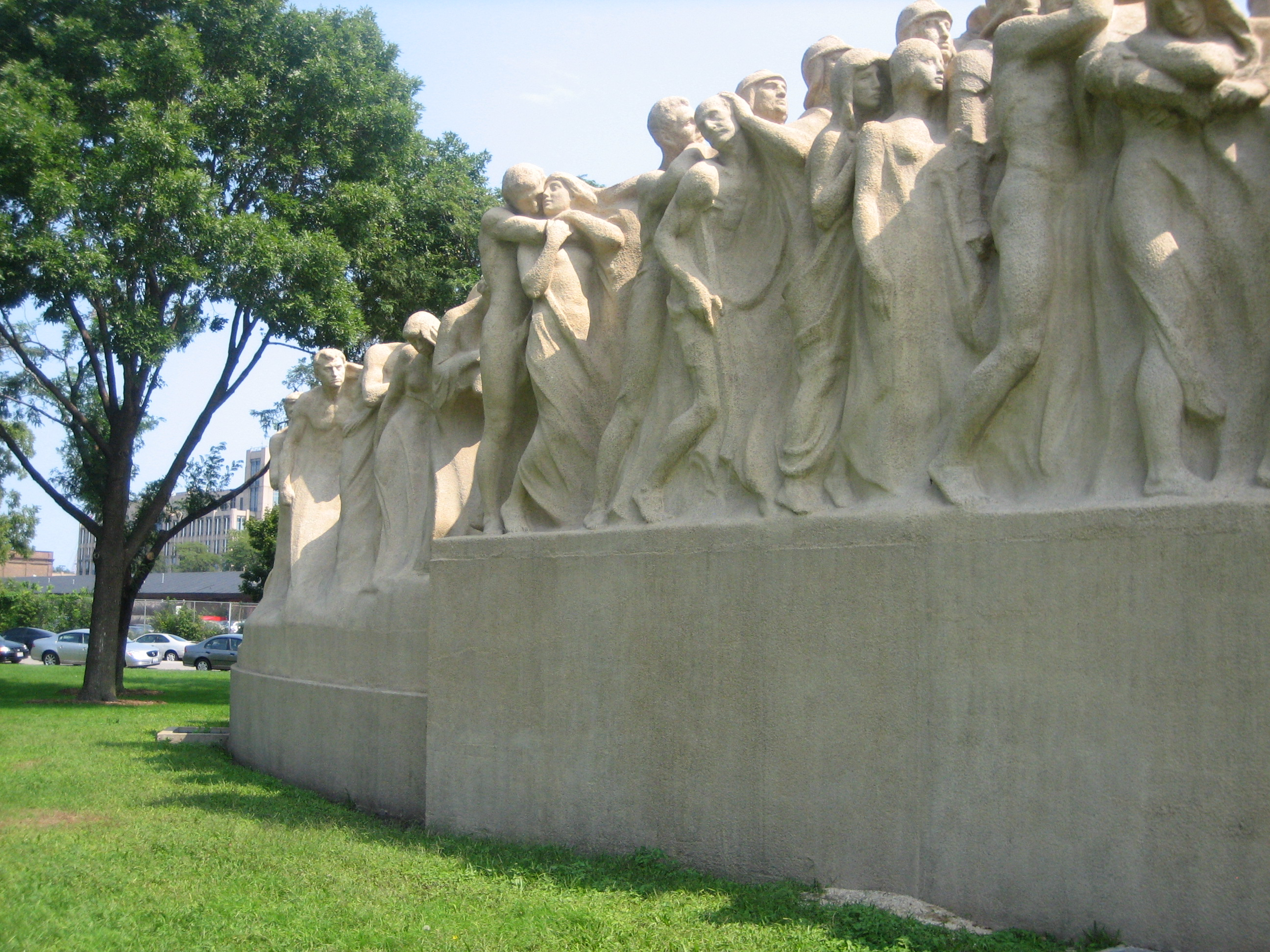
Rear north center

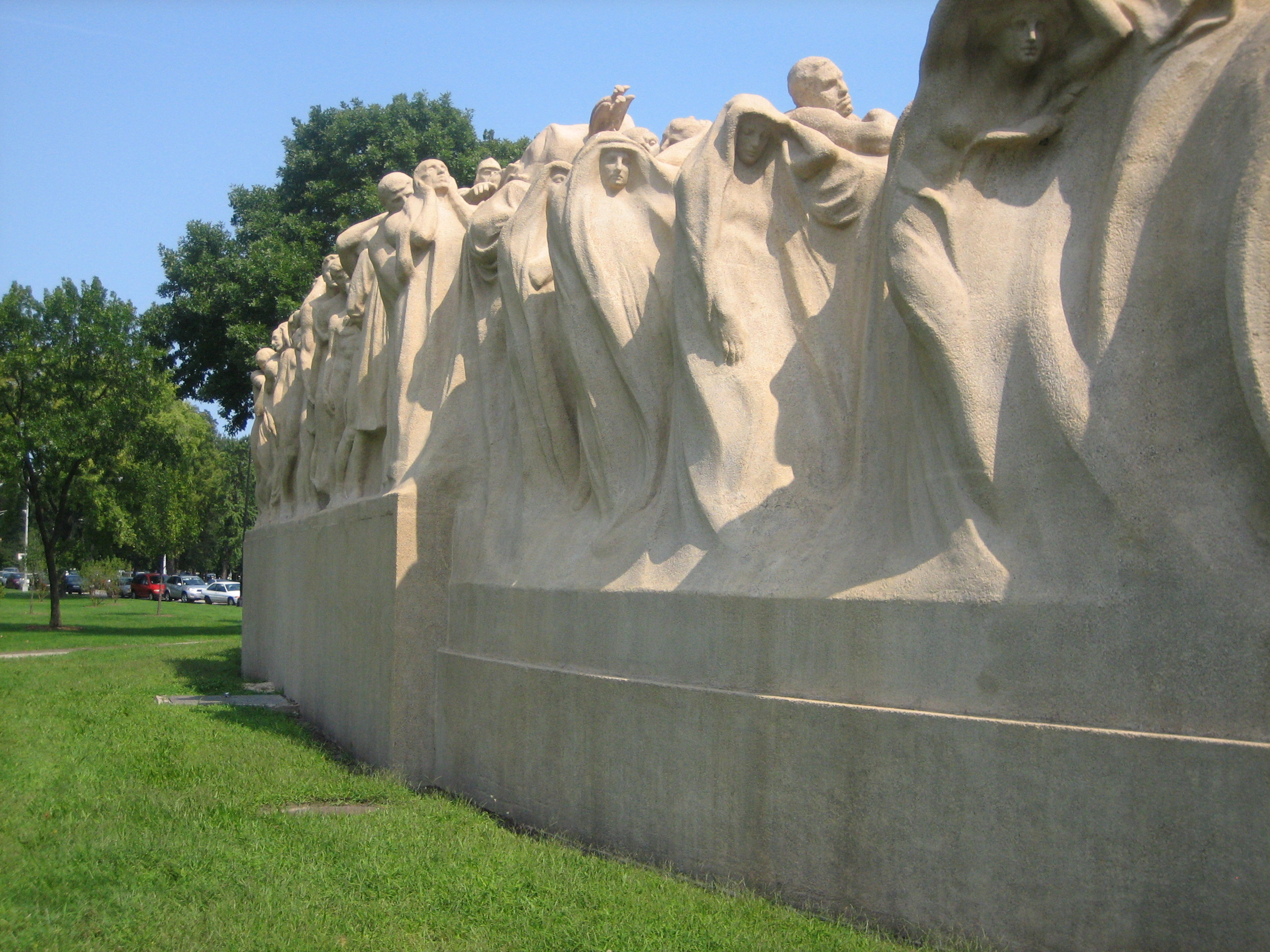
Rear south center

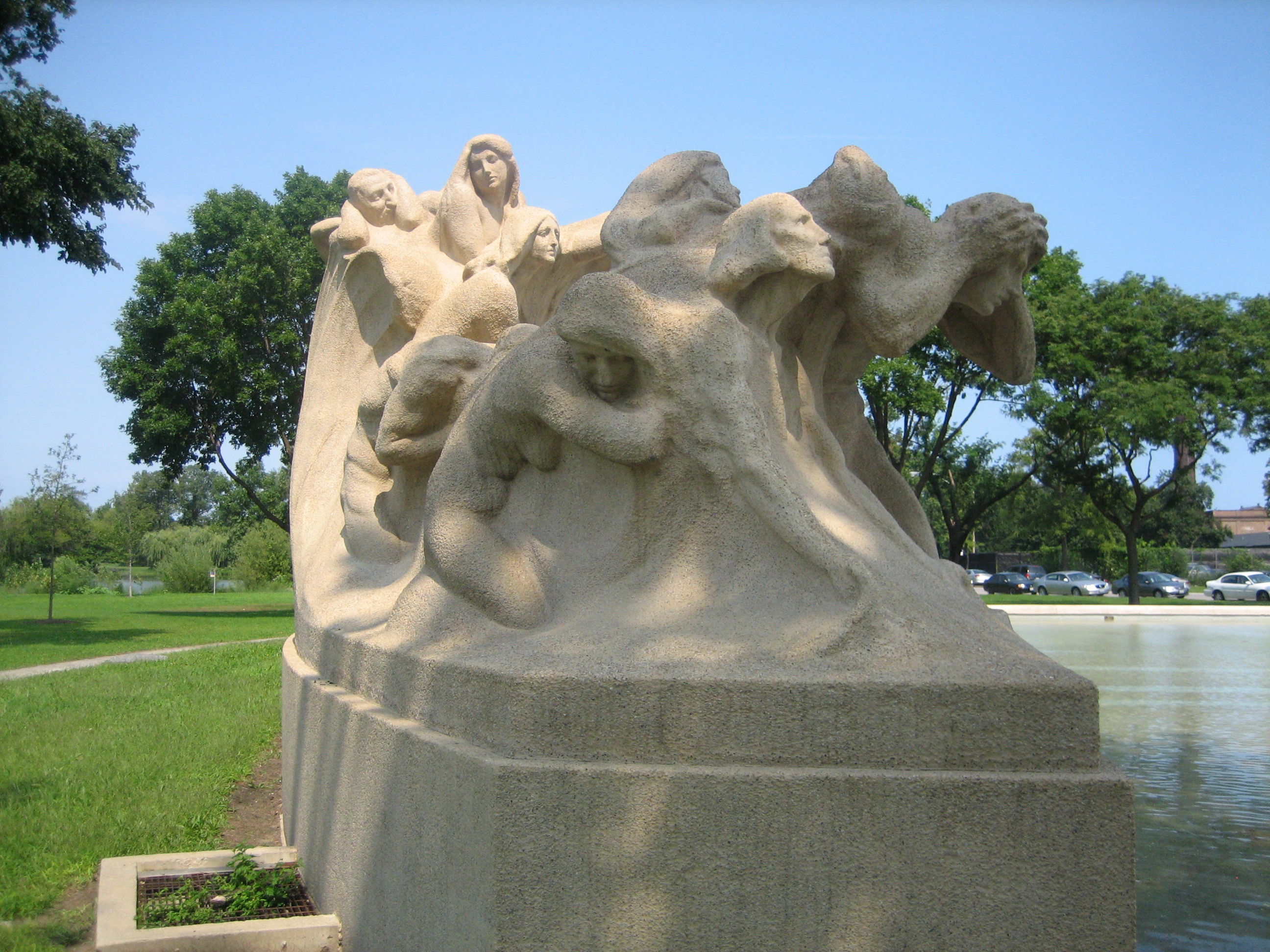
Rear south

== Fountain of Creation ==
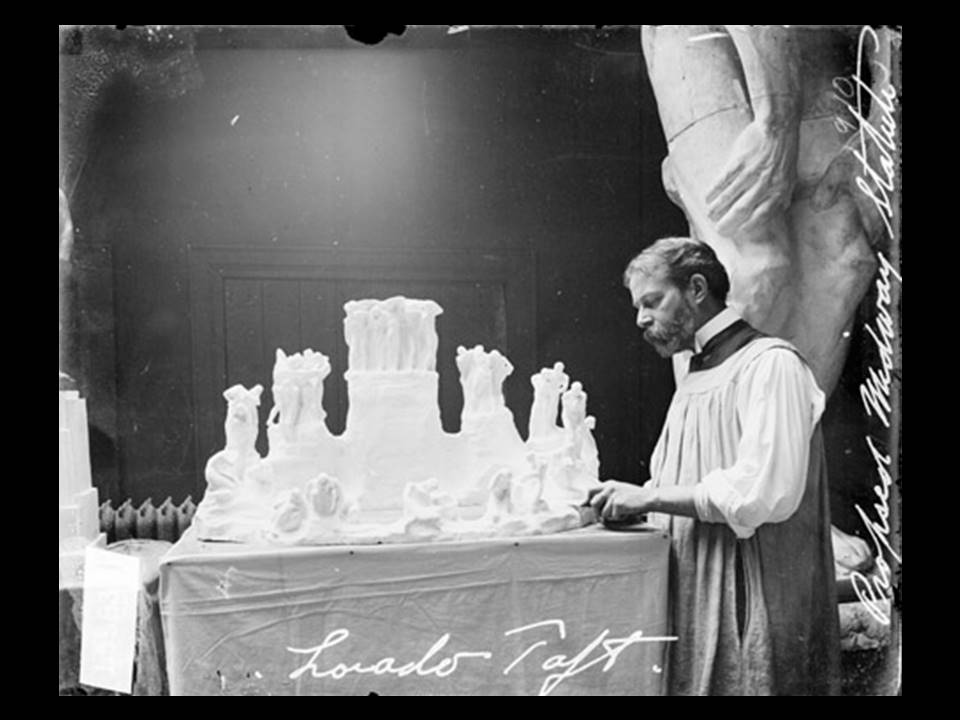
Taft with a model of Fountain of Creation (1910)

Time was intended to be matched by a sister fountain, Fountain of Creation, on the opposite end of the Midway. Work began but was never completed. The finished portions of Fountain of Creation, depicting figures from the Greek legend of the repopulation of Earth after the great flood, are considered Taft's final work, and were given to University of Illinois at Urbana-Champaign, his alma mater. The four surviving elements are figures ranging in height from 5 to 7 feet (1.5 to 2.1 m), and are collectively named Sons and Daughters of Deucalion and Pyrrha. Two of these elements stand outside the entrance to the university's Main Library, and two others are located at the south side of Foellinger Auditorium.

== See also ==
- List of public art in Chicago
