= Fountain of the Great Lakes =

Bronze sculpture by Lorado Taft

Coordinates: 41°52′43.6″N 87°37′24.1″W

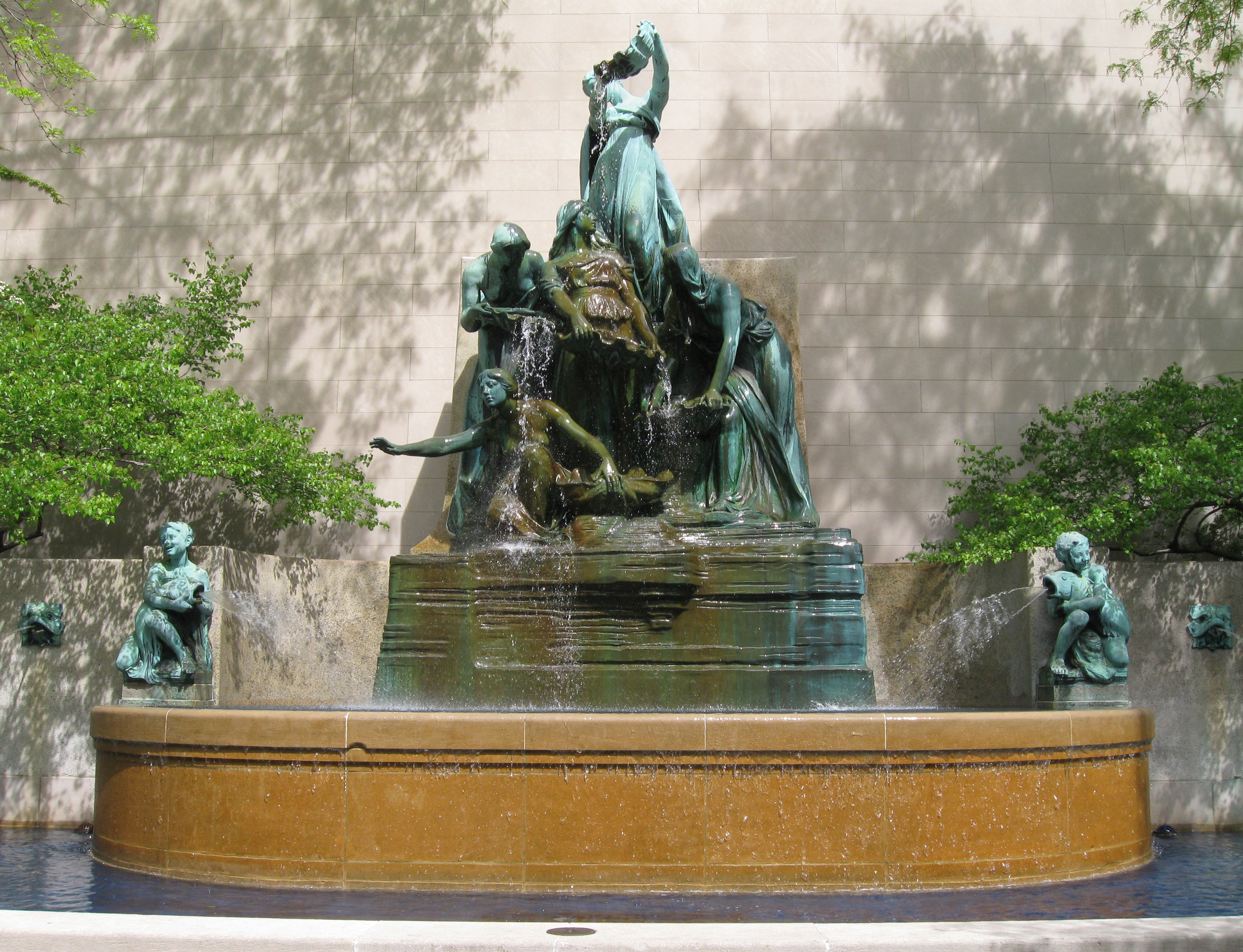
- View looking east in Art Institute of Chicago South McCormick Court at the west-facing fountain
- Artist: Lorado Taft
- Year: 1907–1913
- Type: Bronze
- Dimensions: 670 cm (264 in)
- Location: Art Institute of Chicago, Chicago, Illinois, U.S.

Fountain of the Great Lakes, or Spirit of the Great Lakes Fountain, is an allegorical sculpture and fountain by Lorado Taft. The bronze artwork, created between 1907 and 1913, depicts five women arranged so that the fountains waterfall recalls the waterflow through the five Great Lakes of North America. In the Great Lakes, the waterflow begins in Lake Superior at 600 feet (180 m) above sea level and continues eastward through each lake until it reaches Lake Ontario. The Fountain is one of Taft's best known works. It is located in the public South McCormick Memorial Court of the Art Institute of Chicago, in the Chicago Loop.

The fountain was originally installed on an elevated platform facing south where it remained until 1963, when it was moved next to the Morton Wing addition facing west. In its original location it served as a visible landmark from the Jackson and Michigan Avenue intersection once known as "route center" to the south. The fountain was commissioned by the Benjamin Ferguson fund and one surface references the title B. F. Ferguson Fountain of the Great Lakes. There is a relief sculpture of Benjamin Ferguson on the rear panel that has been hidden from view since the fountain was moved.

As the first commission from the Ferguson Fund, it experienced various funding delays. Additionally, the legal environment for land use in Grant Park was in flux at the time the commission was made, which caused delays in location selection. Once erected, the fountain received largely positive reviews, but a few critics questioned symbolism of the sculpture. Others were caught up in sociopolitical subtexts of the day, with regard to obscenity laws as it related to public art and this semi-nude work.

== Background ==
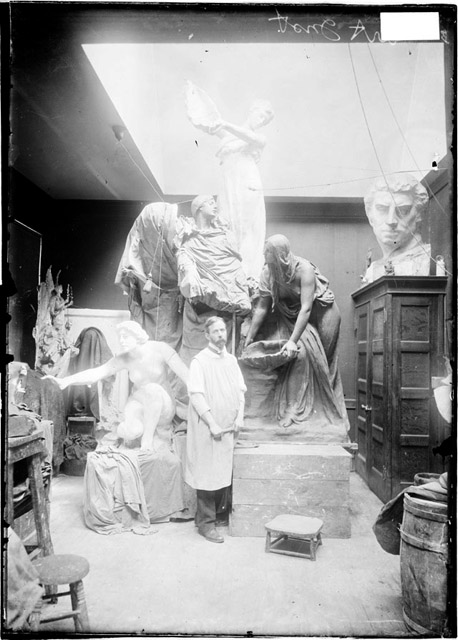
Taft in front of Fountain of the Great Lakes figures (1909)

The surrounding garden was designed by Dan Kiley.

B. F. Ferguson, Commissioner, name is included on this surface. Bars can be seen limiting access to rear view.

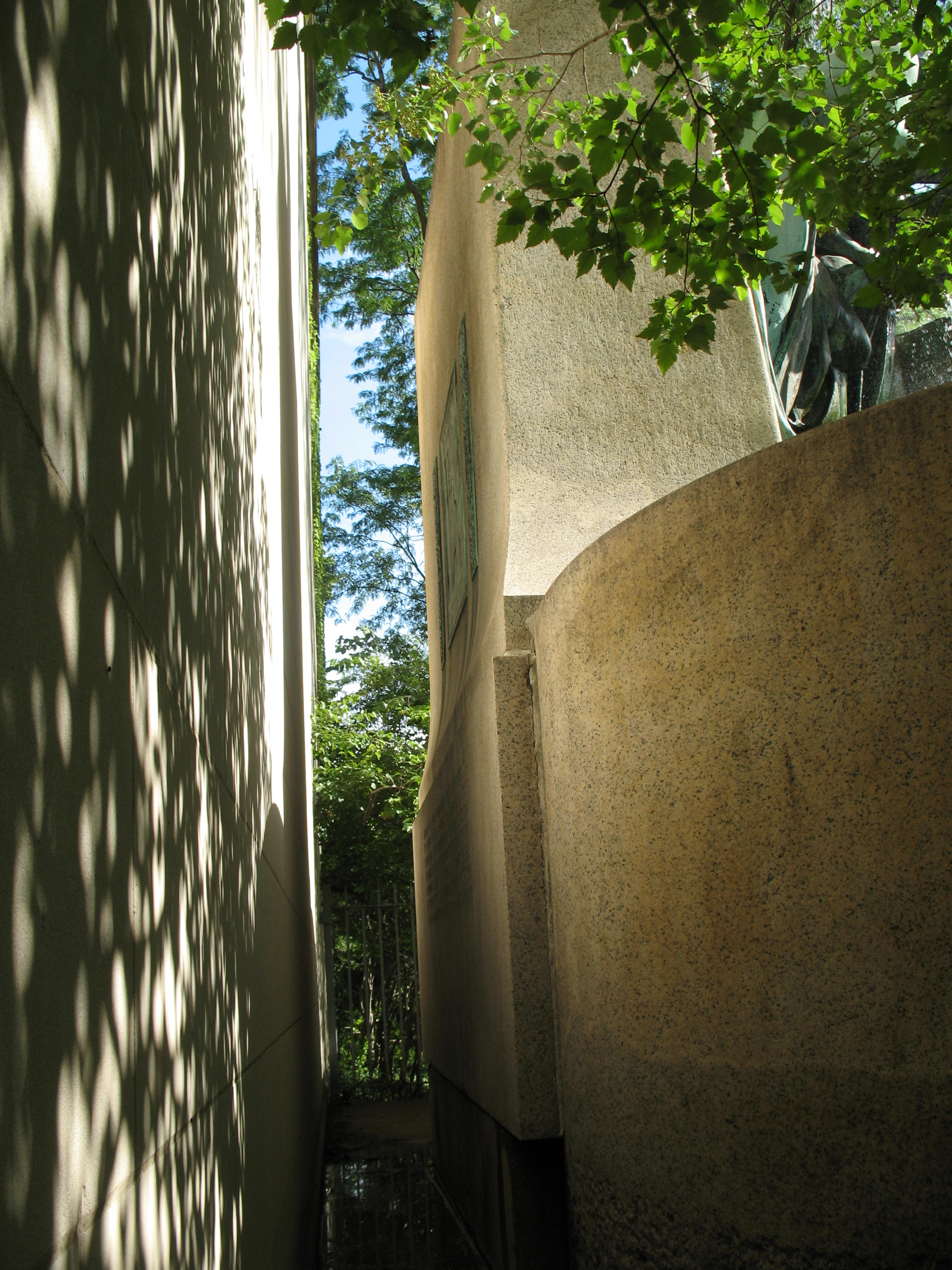
The rear of the sculpture.

Benjamin Ferguson's 1905 $1 million charitable trust gift to "memorialize events in American History" funded The Fountain, and many other public works in Chicago. As the city attempted to determine a policy for the fund's use, Taft argued for fountains, allegorical statuary, discreetly placed portrait busts, and the adornment of bridges and park entrances in order to create long-lasting beauty in addition to supporting the style of art he pursued. By September 1905 his name was linked in the press to the fund as a possible deserving recipient of its first commission. During the 1905–1906 year he began to place greater emphasis on sculpture in the classes he taught at the School of the Art Institute of Chicago, while simultaneously refining earlier allegorical.

The fountain is Taft's response to Daniel Burnham's complaint at the Columbian Exposition in 1893 that the sculptors charged with ornamenting the fairgrounds failed to produce anything that represented the great natural resources of the west, especially the Great Lakes. In Spring 1902, Taft had assigned his students a work entitled Spirit of the Great Lakes. Five women had molded individual figures in response to an assignment and joined them in a tiered group with an imagined waterflow from the containers that they held. By mid-January 1906, Taft cast a plaster version, which he exhibited to Ferguson Fund Trestee Charles L. Hitchinson on January 17 at Taft's Midway Studios. By the end of January, The Art Institute of Chicago displayed the work during its annual local works exhibition. It gained support during its four-week display and won the Chicago Municipal Art League top sculpture award, and along with two other bust works he won the Society of Chicago Artists' Medal for general excellence. The Municipal art League exhibition chairperson, Mrs. William F. Grower, decided to form a subcommittee to help satisfy public support for the work to be the first Ferguson fund commission. However, even after the probate court released the bequest to the trustees on May 23, 1906, no commission was made because the trustees were undecided between a statuary and a portrait commission.

Additionally, Grant Park has been protected since 1836 by "forever open, clear and free" legislation that has been affirmed by several Illinois Supreme Court rulings. Aaron Montgomery Ward twice sued the city of Chicago to force it to remove buildings and structures from Grant Park and to keep it from building new ones. The second suit was still pending in 1906 and the legal cloud regarding deliberations of architectural limitations in Grant Park caused inaction. While the trustees remained silent, Taft sought wider public support by publishing a picture of Spirit of the Great Lakes in Century Magazine, which drew interest from Buffalo, New York as a host of the final work. By February 1907, Buffalo Illustrated Times published a cover with an image of the work and a caption describing the anticipation of the Beautifying Buffalo Society for obtaining the work for the city. However, by the end of 1907 Taft and his connections with the Trust Fund resolved his commission.

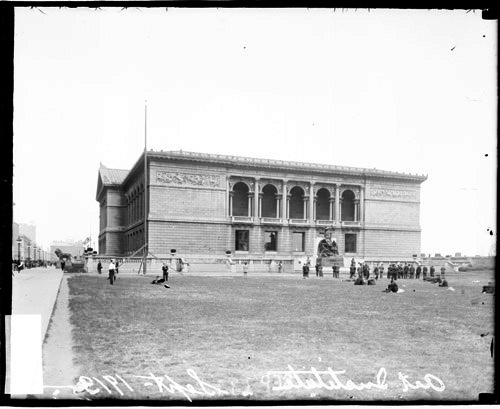
Fountain of the Great Lakes faced south from the Art Institute of Chicago's south side from 1913–1963.

On October 31, 1907, the Ferguson Trust Board voted Taft a commission, and on December 16, he signed a $38,000 contract to commence work. The commission was the first commission from the Ferguson fund. Despite the financial agreement it would be some time before a determination of a site for the work. Ward's suit continued to loom over the deliberations. One proposal was to locate it in Grant Park south of the Art Institute and another was to locate it at the 35th Street and Grand Boulevard (Now Martin Luther King, Jr. Drive) intersection that now hosts the Chicago Landmark and National Register of Historic Places-listed Victory Monument. The 1909 Art Institute annual report mentioned a proposal for a sunken garden with a focal fountain south of the institute. Legal issues regarding land use intensified in 1910, and the Art Institute began to make modest plans for the fountain almost attached to the south wall of its own building. For the next few years there was little mention of the fountain as Taft focused on other work. Then in May 1913, the fountain model at Taft's Midway Studios was disassembled and taken to Jules Berchem's foundry for bronze casting. Shepley, Rutan and Coolidge designed the base for the sculpture. It was subsequently assembled by mid-August in preparation for a September 9, 1913 dedication date.

In 1963 with the construction of the new Morton wing of the Art Institute of Chicago Building, the fountain was moved from its south facing position adjacent to the original building that was visible from the Historic Michigan Boulevard District to the west wall of the new wing in a position facing westward. The sculpture was positioned so that the plaque on the back, which reads that the "fund must be used for erecting and maintaining enduring statuary and monuments", is no longer legible.

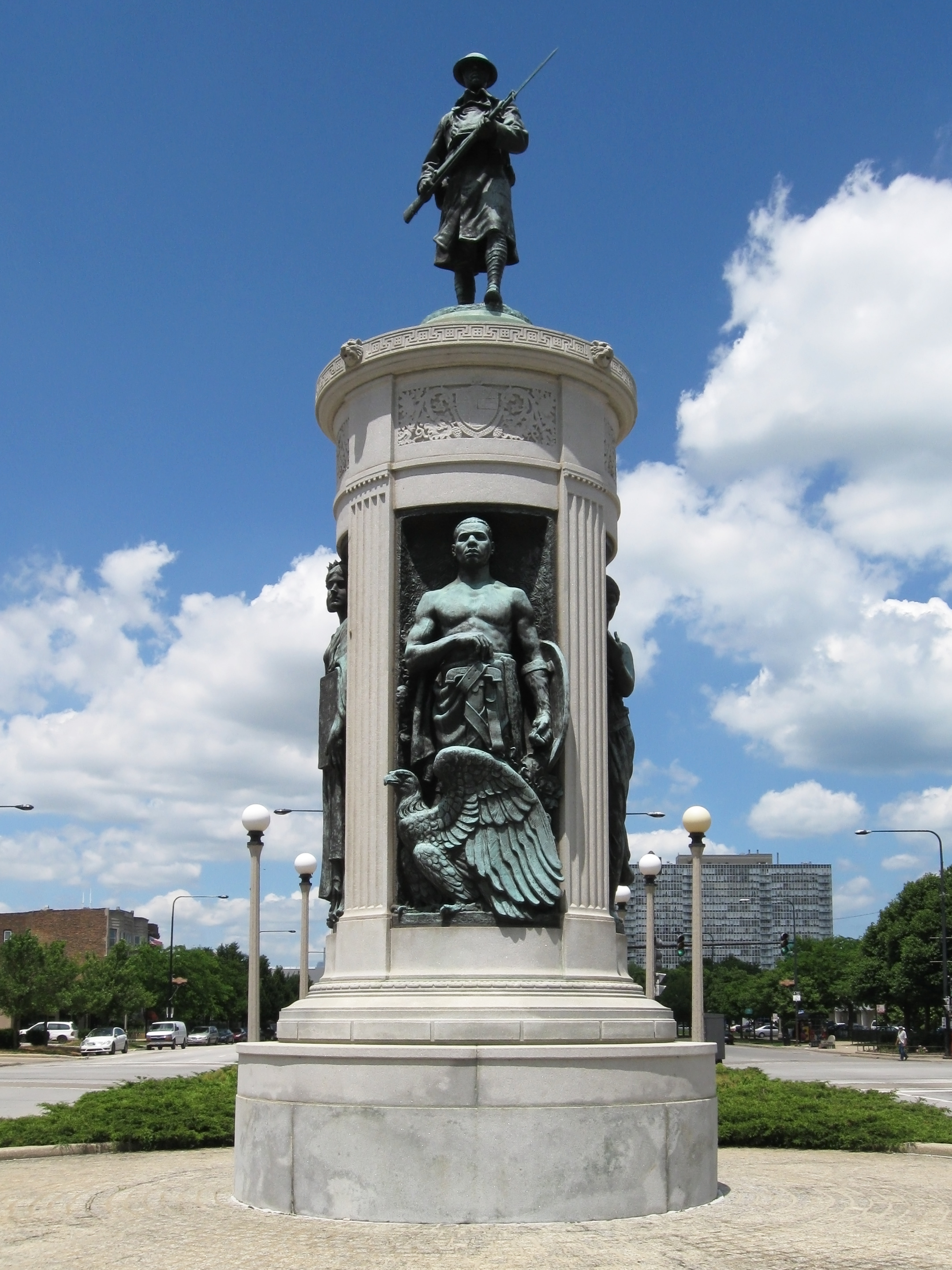
Fountain of the Great Lakes was almost located at 35th Street and King Drive, where the National Register of Historic Places-listed World War I Victory Monument is now sited.

Although Taft is now better remembered for his books such as The History of American Sculpture, which is regarded as the first comprehensive work on the subject in the title, he was in his day well known for portraits and allegorical public sculpture, especially public fountains. The fountain was produced in the period following his assignment to design sculptures for William Le Baron Jenney's Horticultural Building when he designed several large-scale public works, including Fountain of Time.

At the time of the dedication, Taft described the Ferguson Fund commission to sculpt the fountain as a turning point in his career that led to increased publicity, more commissions, and growing recognition in the community, which combined to give him the encouragement for further commitment to the arts. He hoped that the Fountain of the Great Lakes would mark a new era of civic beautification and that it would also mark the beginning of the Chicago school of sculpture. The dream that Chicago would be the epicenter of the sculpting universe had been bred during the World's Columbian Exposition twenty years earlier and rekindled with the Ferguson bequest. Fountain of the Great Lakes was a major career accomplishment for Taft, which propelled him beyond the level of a portraitist.

== Critical response ==
The general opinion of Fountain of the Great Lakes was positive with some describing it as a cultural achievement for Taft and Chicago. The detractors conceded that as a figural composition, it was ideal in an Old World way. Critics voiced concern over the sculpture's confusion and decorum. One of the basic problems for the critics was the propriety of the symbolism of artistic and attractive bronze figures posed as bodies of water. There had for some time been discussion of the depictions representing relative elevations and the flows of the waters as they seem to do. There were grumblings for closer association of the figures to the lakes by use of physical features, directional orientation and definite contours. Harriet Monroe, a general supporter of Taft's artistic efforts, was disappointed in the lack of representative geographic configuration and the lack of spirit of the lakes as inland seas. With respect to this specific piece she had gone from being an ardent supporter who felt the model was "stupendous" to finding herself in "doubt" about the work. Taft's human form depictions of the lake failed to capture the imagery of contemporary literature as it related to the power and fury of nature and the heroism of those struggling against those forces in works such as those of Hamlin Garland, Charles Eugene Banks, Willa Cather, or Robert Morss Lovett. Taft's representations of Lakes with quiet trickling water was in keeping with his general theme of quiet dignity for public sculpture. On the day of the dedication the Chicago Daily News expressed this point with a photomontage juxtaposition of Taft's fountain and Lake Michigan in all its fury.

After one got past the symbolism of the ladies as lakes, complaints existed about the lack of recognition of the contemporary form of female representation in art and literature which had gone from the Lillian Russell-type to the Gibson Girl to the Lillie Langtry image while Taft had apparently chosen "packing house ladies" as his female form. When Taft presented live depictions of his sculptures with quintets of women, he faced complaints that three of his five sculptural compositions had nude upper torsos, while his live representations were fully clothed. The degree to which nudity in public art was more for the "sake of nudity than for the sake of art." was a contemporary issue involving confiscated Paul Chabas fully nude painting, the Roman Catholic Church, critics, art dealers and collectors. All this led to a 1913 amendment to the Chicago municipal obscenity laws proposed by Mayor of Chicago Carter Harrison, Jr. to the Chicago City Council, which passed three months before the dedication of Taft's partially nude fountain. Chicago Tribune writers stood behind Taft's fountain using humor against what they described as a "streak of over-accentuated puritanism" that could adversely affect public art.

Taft had Beaux-Arts training that lent itself well to allegorical sculpture. For Fountain of the Great Lakes, Taft claimed an inspiration from the Greek mythology. Danaus ordered his 49 daughters to kill their husbands and condemned them to delivering water to a bottomless vessel in Hades. This was in keeping with Taft's penchant for classical inspiration although this was a loose association where the number of daughters was reduced from 49 to 5 and the artist's task did not seem to be nearly as cruel as the mythological one.

== See also ==
- List of public art in Chicago
