= Lorado Taft Midway Studios =

Buildings in Chicago, Illinois

- U.S. National Register of Historic Places
- U.S. National Historic Landmark
- Chicago Landmark
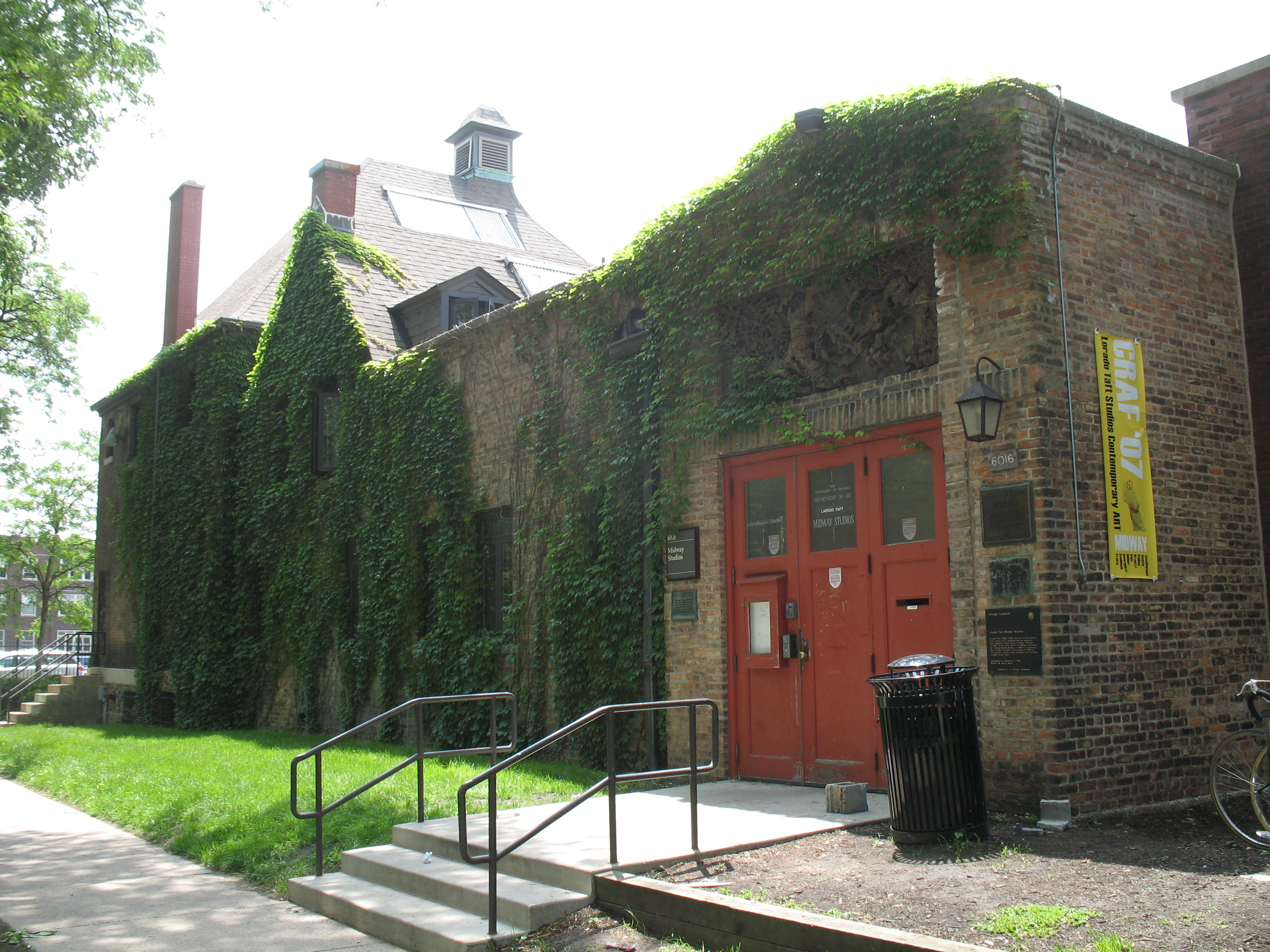
- View from northeast.

- Location within Chicago metropolitan area Location within Illinois Location within the United States
- Location: South Ingleside Ave. and E. 60th St., Chicago, IL
- Coordinates: 41°47′8″N 87°36′12.63″W
- Area: less than one acre
- Built: 1906
- Architect: Lorado Taft, Pond and Pond
- NRHP reference No.: 66000317

Significant dates
- Added to NRHP: October 15, 1966
- Designated NHL: December 21, 1965
- Designated CHICL: December 1, 1993

The Lorado Taft Midway Studios are a historic artist studio complex at South Ingleside Avenue and East 60th Street, on the campus of the University of Chicago on the South Side of Chicago. The architecturally haphazard structure, originating as two converted barns and a Victorian house, was used from 1906 to 1929 as the studio of Lorado Taft (1860-1936), one of the most influential sculptors of the period. A National Historic Landmark, it now houses the university's visual arts department.

== Description and history ==
The Lorado Taft Midway Studio is a conglomeration of structures standing on the south side of the University of Chicago campus, on the west side of South Ingleside Avenue at East 60th Street. The northern end of the structure is a two-story Victorian house, from which a series of single-story sections extend southward, joining the house to adjacent two-story barn structures, one with a gabled roof and the other with a hip roof. Historically, these elements framed a courtyard that was open to the west, except for a fringing hedge and fence; this has since been filled by additional studio space. The interior is as rambling as the exterior, much of it composed of a warren of smaller studio spaces.

Lorado Taft was educated at the University of Illinois at Urbana-Champaign, receiving both a bachelor's (1879) and master's degree (1880) in art. In the 1880s he continued his studies in Paris, and returned to Chicago in 1885, joining the faculty of the Chicago Art Institute in 1886. In 1906, Taft moved his main studio from the Chicago Loop to a brick barn near the Midway Plaisance. Later, he connected a pair of frame barns to the main building to serve as male and female dormitories. The structure was redesigned by the architectural firm of Pond and Pond to contain 13 studios for Taft and affiliated sculptors.

The building was designated a National Historic Landmark on December 21, 1965, and was listed on the National Register of Historic Places on October 15, 1966. It is one of the four Chicago Registered Historic Places from the original October 15, 1966 National Register of Historic Places list (along with Chicago Pile-1, Hull House, and Robie House). On December 1, 1993, it was named a Chicago Landmark.

Today, the building is home to the university's Department of Visual Arts and Creative Writing program, and has been renovated to be classrooms, offices, and studios for students and faculty.

== Gallery ==
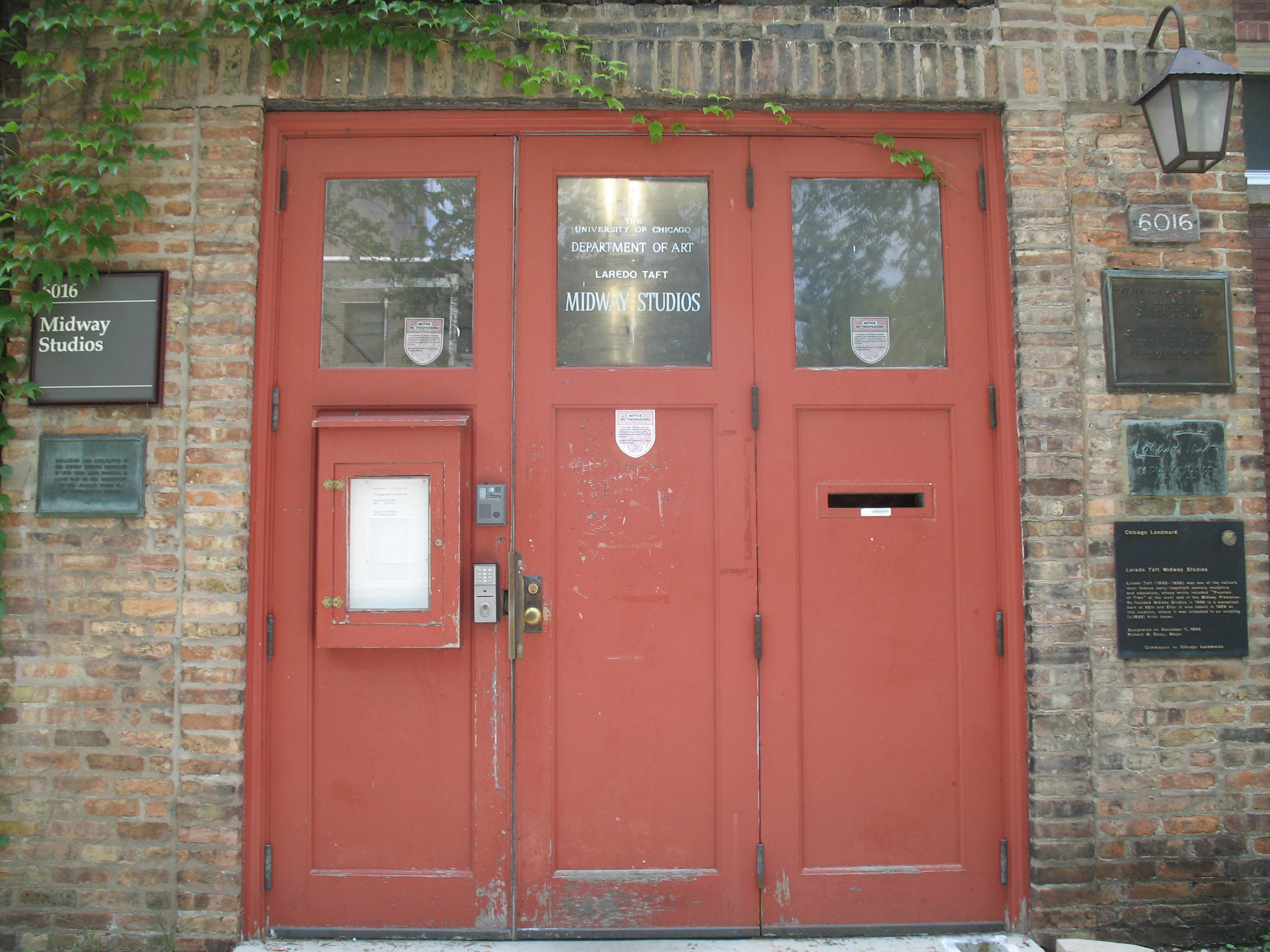
Entrance

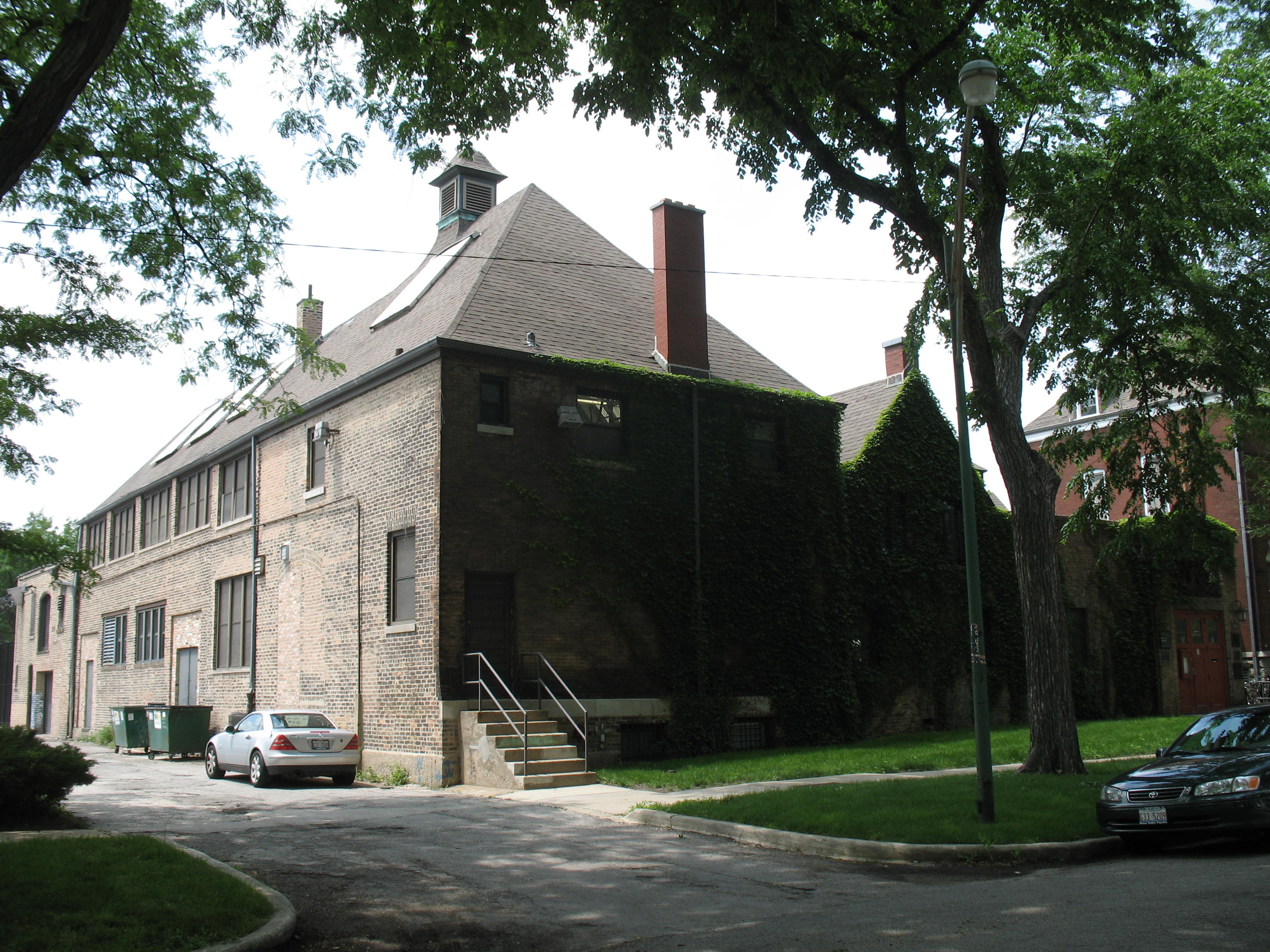
View from southeast

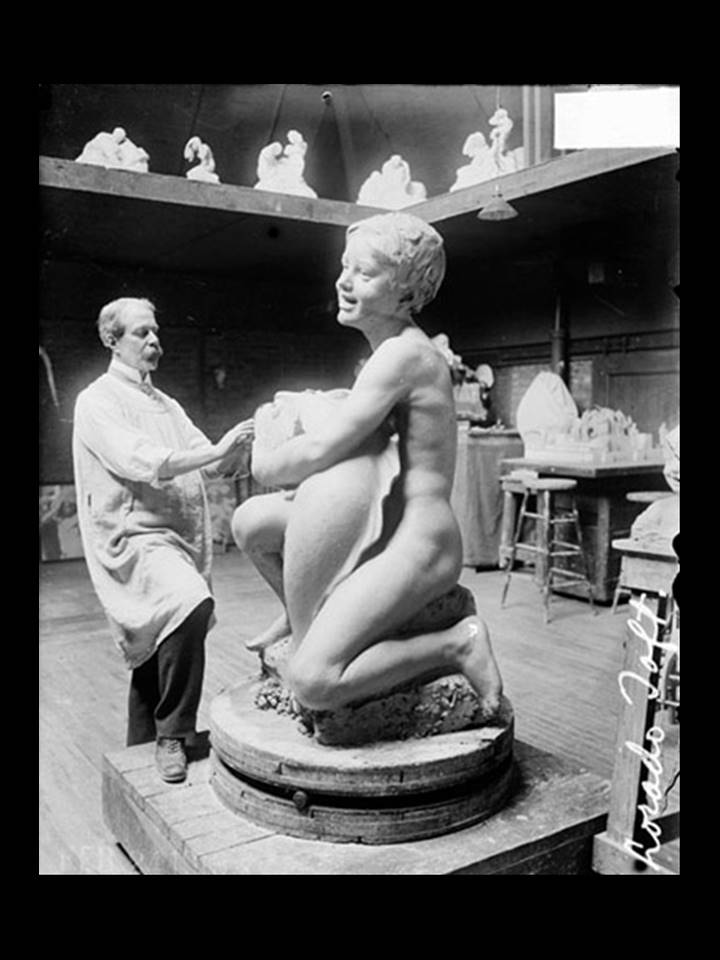
Lorado Taft at work on Fountain of the Great Lakes in 1913 in his Midway Studios

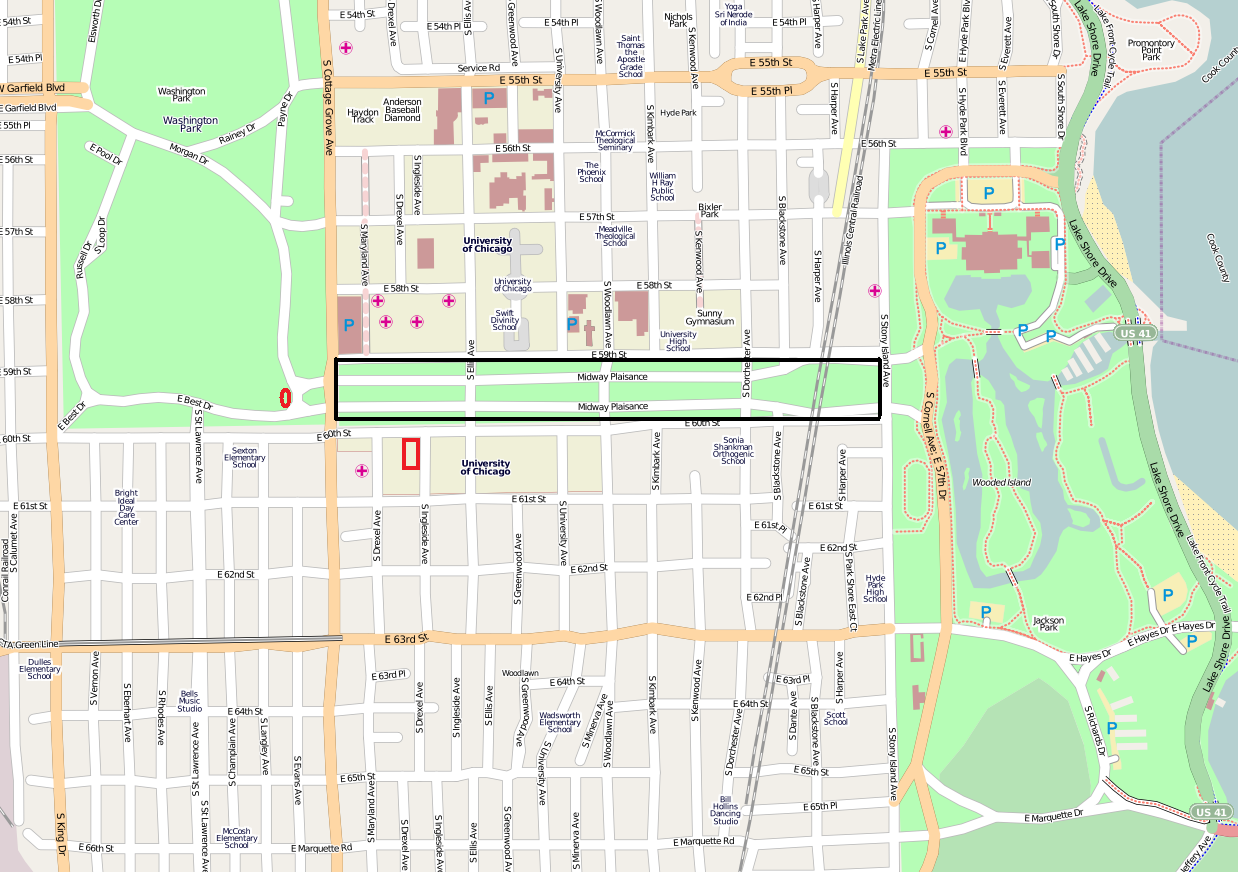
Lorado Taft Midway Studios (red rectangle) is just south of the Midway Plaisance. Fountain of Time (red oval) is in the southeast portion of Washington Park immediately west of the Midway Plaisance. (Chicago Park District in green, University of Chicago in pink)

== See also ==
- List of Chicago Landmarks
- List of National Historic Landmarks in Illinois
- National Register of Historic Places listings in South Side Chicago
