= Benjamin F. Ferguson =

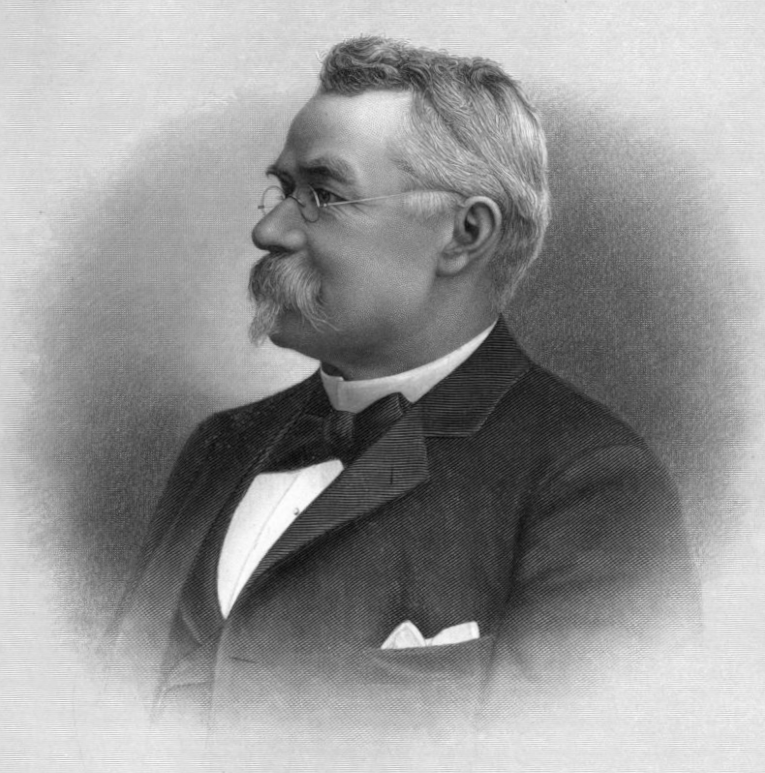
- Born: Benjamin Franklin Ferguson c. 1838
- Died: April 10, 1905; Chicago, Illinois, US
- Burial place: Rosehill Cemetery
- Occupation: Lumber merchant

Benjamin Franklin Ferguson (c. 1838 – 1905) was an American lumber merchant and co-founder of the Santee River Cypress Lumber Company. The firm specialized in the harvesting of old-growth timber from the blackwater river bottomlands of central South Carolina, in and around the Santee River watershed. The tracts of land logged by Ferguson, in partnership with fellow logging executive Francis Beidler, included substantial tracts of valuable bald cypress.

With profits from the Santee River logging venture, Ferguson became a philanthropist. His 1905 $1 million ($35.8 million today) charitable trust gift funded seventeen of the most notable public monuments and sculptures in Chicago, Illinois, United States. The works include Lorado Taft's Fountain of Time and Fountain of the Great Lakes, Henry Moore's Nuclear Energy at Chicago Pile-1 and Man Enters the Cosmos, and a work by Isamu Noguchi. Ferguson's gift set out terms whereby the Art Institute of Chicago was empowered to select subjects and sites for "The erection and maintenance of enduring statuary and monuments, in whole or in part of stone, granite or bronze in the parks, along the boulevards or in other public places." The Art Institute also funded Carl Milles's Fountain of the Tritons, which sits in its courtyard, with this fund, but by the 1930s began to tire of standard sculpture and sought a court ruling to include buildings within the terms of the agreement. In the 1950s, they used some of the funds to add a wing to the Art Institute of Chicago Building, named the B. F. Ferguson Memorial Building. A relief sculpture of Benjamin Ferguson appears on the back on Fountain of the Great Lakes. The fund also commissioned the recognizable The Bowman and The Spearman sculptures by Ivan Meštrović on opposite sides of Congress Parkway at Michigan Avenue and in Grant Park. The fund has commissioned the Illinois Centennial Memorial Column in Logan Square by Lincoln Memorial architect, Henry Bacon, to commemorate the 100th anniversary of Illinois' statehood. At the same time in 1918, the Fund commissioned a replica of the Statue of The Republic in Jackson Park to commemorate the 25th anniversary of the Chicago World's Fair. One of the more recent fundings was Louise Bourgeois's black granite The Waltz of Hands Jane Addams Memorial in 1996; however, the management of the fund has come under question in the 21st century. Ferguson lived in the Jackson Boulevard District of the Near West Side community area of Chicago, where he built a red brick Queen Anne house in 1883 that took up three city lots.

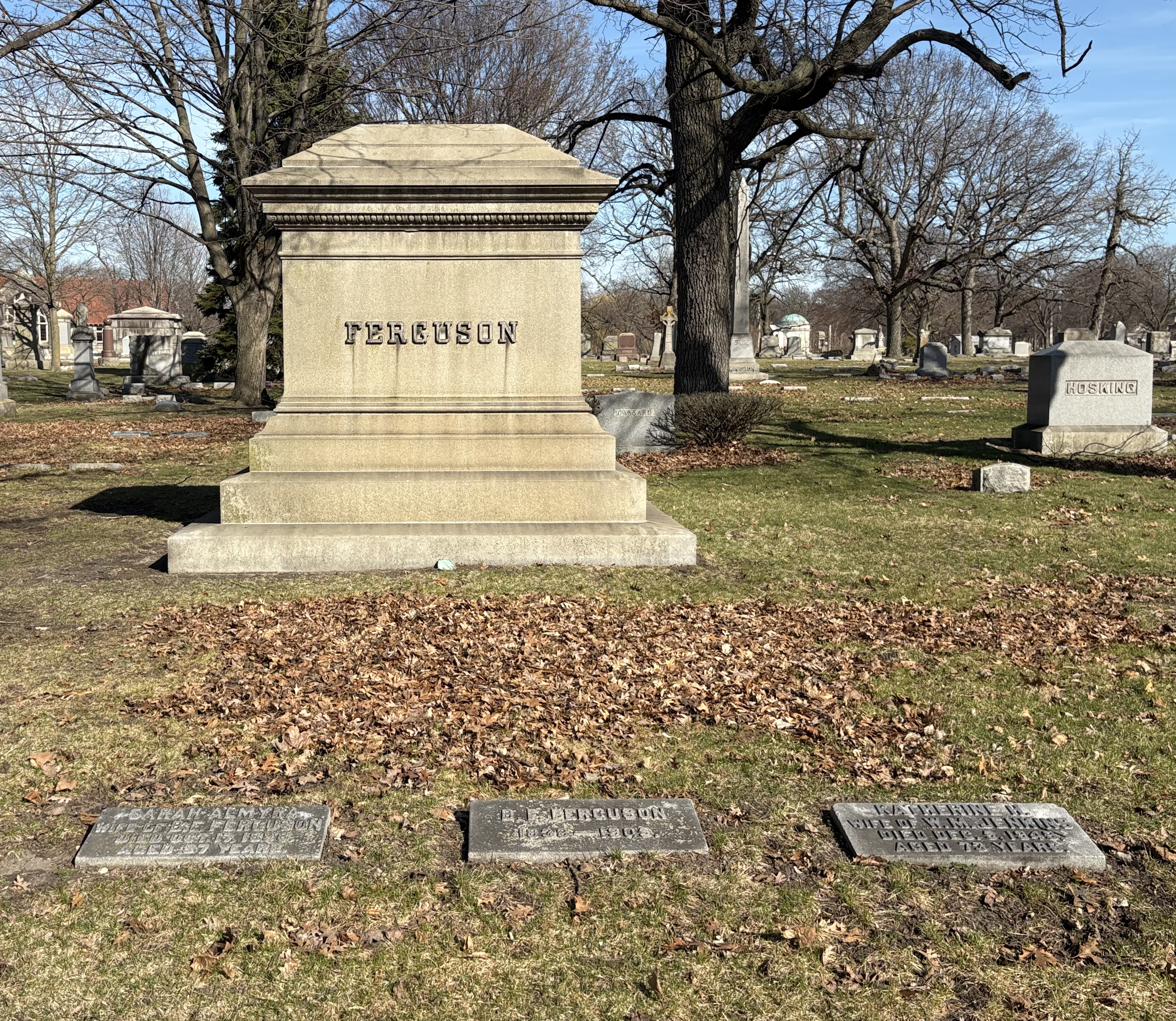
Ferguson's grave at Rosehill Cemetery

Ferguson died at his home in Chicago on April 11, 1905 and was buried at Rosehill Cemetery.

The ghost town of Ferguson, South Carolina, named after Ferguson, contained the mills operated by the lumberman and his partner.
