= Ferguson, South Carolina =

Ferguson
- Ghost town
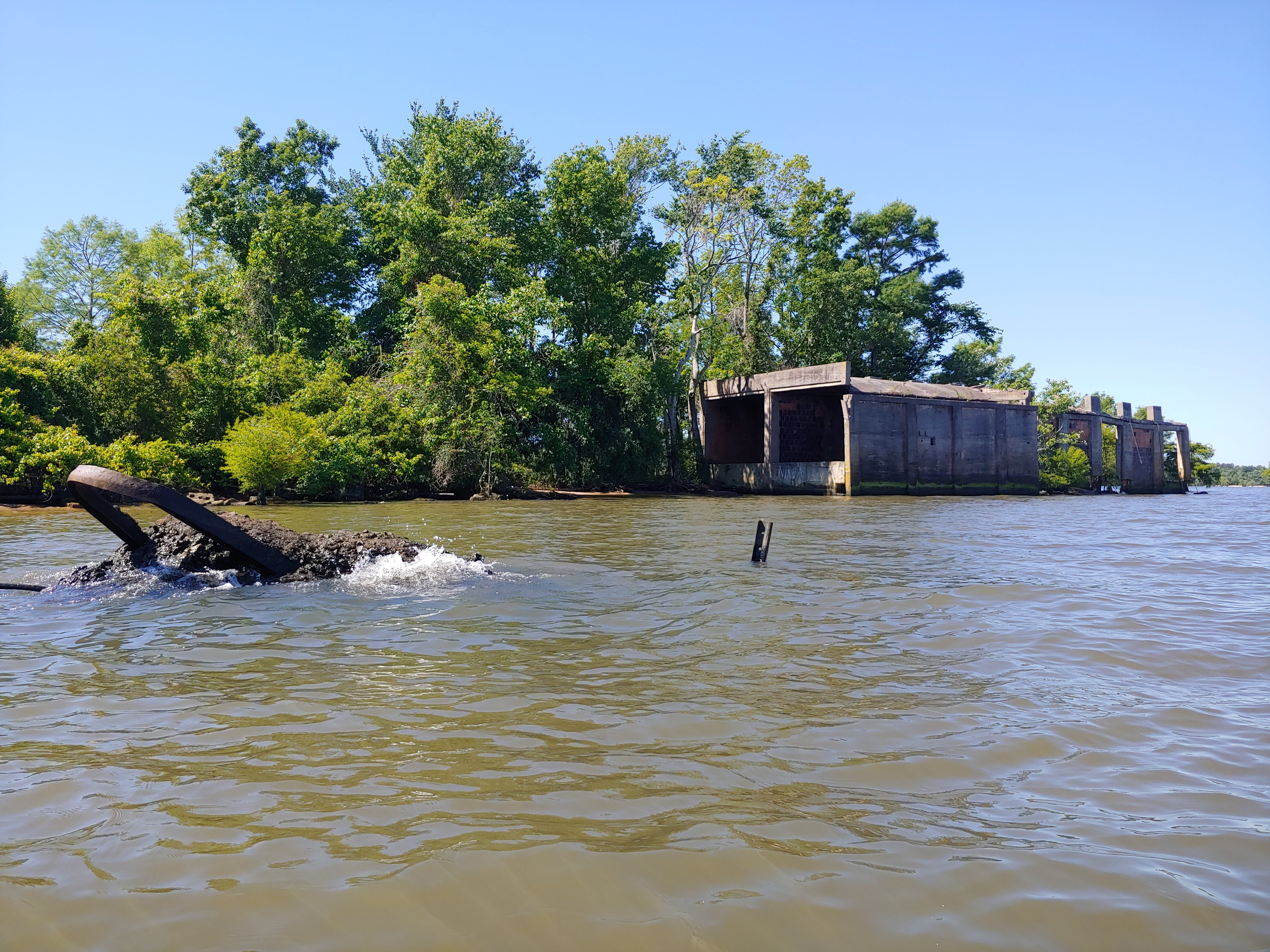
- Remnants of Ferguson, SC

- Location within South Carolina Location within the United States
- Coordinates: 33°26′11.72″N 80°16′32.86″W
- Country: United States
- State: South Carolina
- County: Orangeburg
- Founded: 1881
- Elevation: 72 ft (22 m)

Population (2019)
  - Total: 0
- Time zone: UTC−5 (Eastern)
  - Summer (DST): UTC−4 (EDT)
- Area codes: 843

Ferguson is a ghost town, a former lumber-mill settlement, in Orangeburg County, South Carolina. It was a company town owned by Northern lumbermen Francis Beidler and Benjamin F. Ferguson, both of Chicago. The co-CEOs founded the Santee River Cypress Lumber Company in 1881 for the purpose of harvesting old-growth timber from blackwater river wetlands in central South Carolina. The firm, which controlled 165,000 acres (67,000 ha) of land, concentrated its efforts on bald cypress timber.

Operations were highly profitable, as the Santee Cypress Company had purchased valuable timberland for as little as $2.00/acre. In the 1880s, Beidler and Ferguson set up a company town. They invested in infrastructure for the new village that included paved streets, indoor plumbing, and street lighting with coal gas. Sawmills began to cut wood, and a kiln was built to produce treated wood products such as creosote-infused railroad ties. The post office began operations in 1890. However, the 350 Ferguson workers and their families were exploited through the standard company-town system of paying workers in untransferable "currency." Ferguson company-store coins are marked Santee Mercantile Co.

The Santee Cypress Company shut down its Ferguson operations in 1915. Workers were laid off, and the town was soon abandoned and became a ghost town. The post office ceased operations in 1917. The Santee Cooper Power and Navigation Project, commenced in 1939, included the construction of the Santee Dam downstream from the Ferguson ghost town site. Soon the former town site was covered by the surface of Lake Marion. The lake's shallow waters continue to cover most of the town site as of 2019.
