= Minnekirken =

Norwegian-American Lutheran church in Chicago

Norwegian Lutheran Memorial Church
- Minnekirken
- Norwegian: Den Norske Lutherske Minnekirke
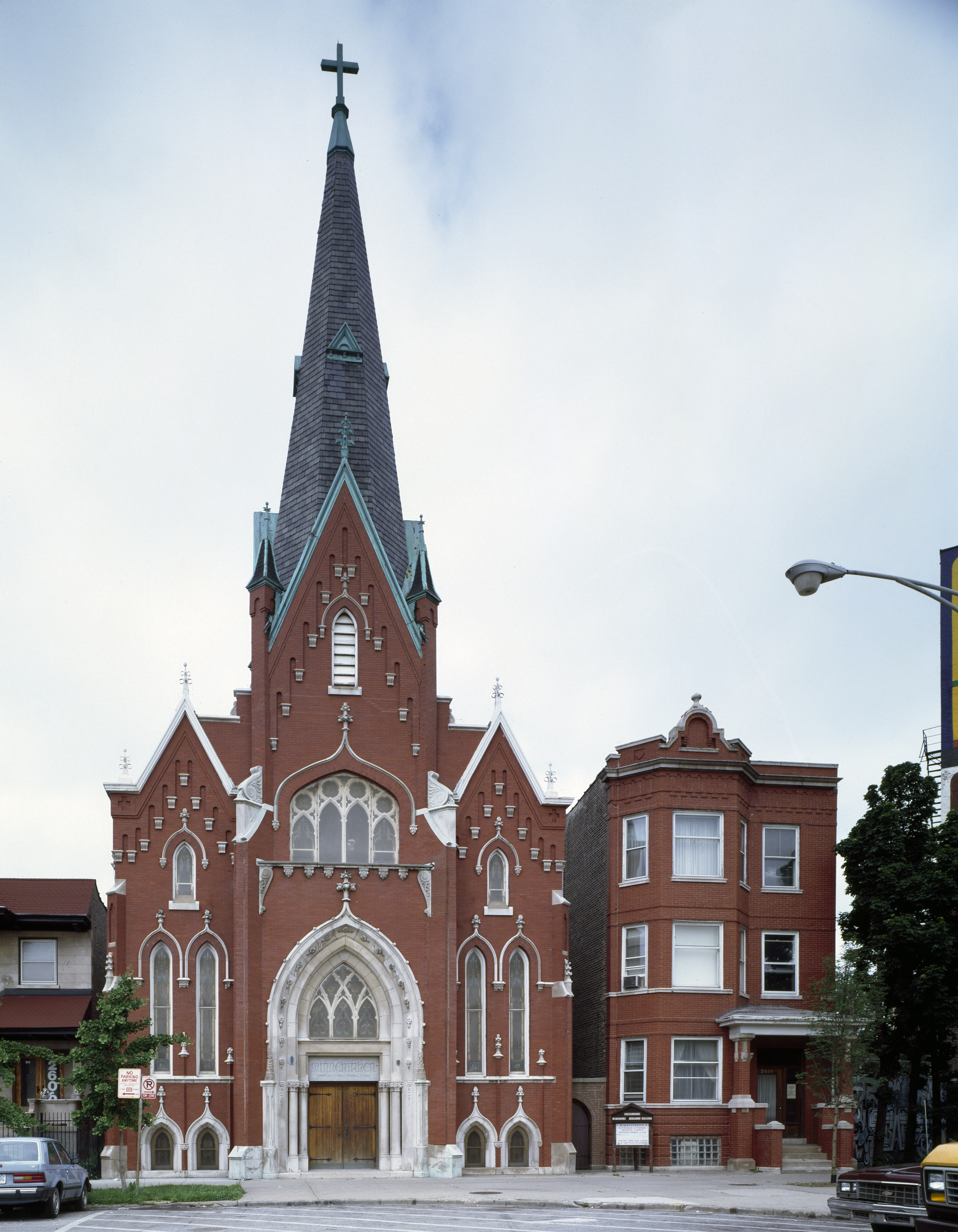
- The church from Logan Square
- Norwegian Lutheran Memorial Church
- 41.928711°N 87.708111°W
- Location: Logan Square, Chicago, Illinois
- Address: 2614 North Kedzie Boulevard
- Country: United States
- Denomination: Lutheran Congregations in Mission for Christ
- Website: www.minnekirken-chicago.org

History
- Status: Church
- Founded: June 29, 1905

Architecture
- Functional status: Active
- Heritage designation: Contributing property in the Logan Square Boulevards Historic District
- Architect: Charles F. Sorensen
- Style: Gothic Revival
- Groundbreaking: 1908
- Completed: 1912
- Closed: 1928 (reopened in 1934)

Norwegian Lutheran Memorial Church (Norwegian: Den Norske Lutherske Minnekirke), commonly known as Minnekirken, is a Lutheran church and Norwegian-American cultural institution in the Logan Square neighborhood of Chicago, Illinois. Designed by Charles F. Sorensen, its Gothic Revival building at 2614 North Kedzie Boulevard was constructed between 1908 and 1912. It is Chicago's only remaining Norwegian-language church and one of two congregations in the United States that regularly use Norwegian language, hymns, and liturgy; its services are conducted in both English and Norwegian.

== History ==
At the beginning of the 20th century, Logan Square was the center of Chicago's Norwegian community, with specialty shops, clubs such as the Chicago Norske Klub, and singing societies. The Christ Norwegian Lutheran Church congregation was organized on June 29, 1905, under pastor Johan Meyer.

Construction proceeded in two stages. The cornerstone was laid on April 12, 1908, and the congregation used the completed basement as its worship space while work continued above it. The sanctuary and steeple were completed in 1912, and the building was dedicated as Kristus Norske Lutherske Kirke on October 6 of that year.

Financial difficulties forced the original congregation to close the church in 1928. The forebears of the present congregation took over the building in 1932, and Meyer reopened it in 1934 under the name Norwegian Lutheran Memorial Church. King Olav V of Norway visited the church on October 16, 1975. The congregation has been a member of Lutheran Congregations in Mission for Christ since 2015.

== Architecture and preservation ==
The church is a Protestant adaptation of Gothic Revival architecture modeled on Bragernes Church in Drammen, Norway. Its red-brick façade has limestone accents, pointed-arch windows and an entrance portal, stained glass set in tracery, and a central tower capped by a spire.

Minnekirken is a contributing building in the Logan Square Boulevards Historic District, which was listed on the National Register of Historic Places in 1985 and designated a Chicago Landmark district on November 1, 2005. It was the only church whose congregation consented to inclusion in the city landmark district.

In 2021, the Chicago Commission on Landmarks approved a $250,000 Adopt-a-Landmark grant toward a $725,000 exterior restoration. The project addressed water infiltration, displaced masonry, the tower's structural framing, limestone details, and flashing; the façade and tower were restored that year.

== Worship and cultural role ==
As Norwegian families moved from Logan Square to the suburbs during the late 20th century, the church's congregation became smaller and its use of English increased. Norwegian readings, hymns, and songs remained part of its services. The church remains a gathering place for Norwegian Americans across the Chicago area. Its programs have included choir concerts for Christmas, Easter, and Norwegian Constitution Day, a holiday bazaar, and classes in the Norwegian language, rosemaling, and traditional baking.
