= Helen Svensson Fletre =

Helen Svensson Fletre (March 16, 1909 – March 15, 1987) was a Swedish-born, American author and journalist.

== Background ==
Helen Svensson was a native of Ödeshög, Sweden. She was educated in Sweden and London. She earned a teacher's degree in London in 1931. She served as a governess in England and later as a teacher in Norway. On a 1932 trip to see relatives in Chicago, she met prominent Norwegian-American sculptor Lars Fletre. In 1934 they were married. They lived in Norway, principally in Voss Municipality until 1954, when they moved to Chicago with their three children, settling in Logan Square during 1954.

== Career ==
She became a prominent member of the Norwegian-American community in Chicago & lived in the Logan Square area. She and her husband became active in the many groups which were flourishing at the time, notably DeLiSa (Det literaer Samfund), Chicago Norske Klub, Nordmanns Forbundet, Norwegian National League, as well as others. Fletre handled translation and was a guide for the Chicago portion of Olav V of Norway's state visit to the United States. When King Olav V of Norway visited Chicago in 1975, she took him on a personal tour of the Edvard Munch exhibit at the Art Institute of Chicago & other local sites. The visit was to celebrate 150 years of Norwegian emigration to America. She served on the Sesquicentennial Commission and was co-editor of From Fjord to Prairie.

Her mother had been an early feminist in Sweden, and Fletre herself marched here for the Equal Rights Amendment and against nuclear weapons. She also helped found a neighborhood association to combat crime, and was a consultant to Victory Gardens Theater when it staged Ibsen and Strindberg plays. She had three children (Anita, Oddgier, & Valborg) & five grandchildren (Steinar, Erik, Asia, Hjordis, & Bente) & five great-grandchildren (Shane, Brandie, Roman, Lars, & Naomi) & 3 great-great-grandchildren (Konnor, Camryn, & Kaden).

She had written hundreds of articles in Vinland, the Chicago-based Norwegian-American newspaper. As a staff writer for the newspaper Vinland, she contributed numerous articles to that paper. Helen Fletre served as a journalist for the Vinland until it ceased publication with the death of owner-editor Bertram Jensenius in 1976.

She was a familiar figure at symposiums and conferences where she presented papers dealing with Norwegian-American cultural life in Chicago. She was frequently consulted in anything related to Norwegian-Americans in Chicago. In 1976, King Olav bestowed the St. Olav's Medal on her for her sesquicentennial work and for her many years of service to Norway.

In 1984, she read a paper at a Norwegian-American seminar in Norway and also was editor of Bridges to Norway: 1934-1984. She also went to Voss, Norway for the revealing/dedication of "Merksmannen" (a statue by Lars Fletre). During her later years, she was helpful in collecting information for A Century of Urban Life by Odd S. Lovoll and published by the Norwegian-American Historical Association in 1988.

She died (heart attack) at her home one day before her 78th birthday in 1987.

== Selected works ==
- Det literære samfund (The Literary Society of Chicago. Oslo: 1986)
- Obituary (Chicago Tribune: 1987)

== Obituary ==
Chicago Tribune
