= St. Olav's Medal =

St. Olav's Medal St. Olavsmedaljen
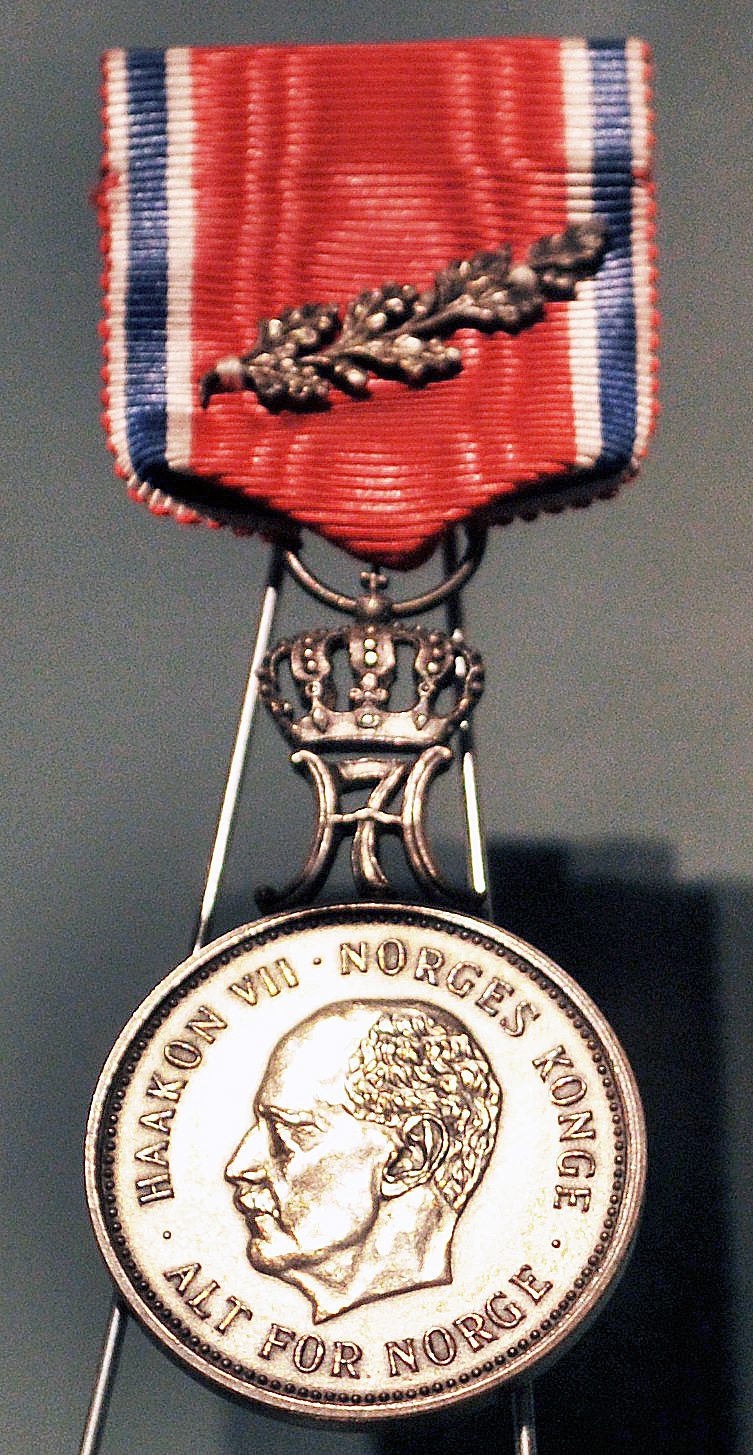
- Picture of medal with Oak Branch
- Type: Medal
- Awarded for: outstanding services rendered in connection with the spreading of information about Norway abroad and for strengthening the bonds between expatriate Norwegians and their home country
- Presented by: Norway
- Established: 17 March 1939
- Ribbons of the medal

Precedence
- Next (higher): King's Medal of Merit
- Next (lower): War Medal
- Related: St. Olav's Medal With Oak Branch

The St. Olav's Medal and the St. Olav's Medal With Oak Branch were instituted by King Haakon VII of Norway on 17 March 1939. They are awarded in recognition of "outstanding services rendered in connection with the spreading of information about Norway abroad and for strengthening the bonds between expatriate Norwegians and their home country".

The medals are in silver, surmounted by the Royal Crown. On the obverse is the portrait of the reigning King with his name and motto. On the reverse, St. Olav's cross. Above the medal is the monogram of the reigning King. It is worn on the left side of the breast with the ribbon of the Order of St. Olav. The medal ranks 9th in the order of precedence of Norwegian medals.

When awarded for services rendered in wartime, the medal carries an oak branch and ranks 6th in the order of precedence of Norwegian medals.

== Recipients of the medal ==
A complete searchable list of medal recipients can be found here.

- 1939 Henry Poynter Burnett, Commander (late Rear Admiral), USN
- 1939 Brenda Ueland, author and teacher, Minneapolis, Minnesota
- c1942 Captain Andrew Henry, O.B.E. ref. Shetland Family History www.bayanne.info/Shetland Person I.D. I53644
- 1944 Egil Melsom, Assistant Engineer on the M/T Gallia
- 1951 Rev. Bent Emil Carlsen, known as "Pastor", of Milton, Massachusetts; in recognition of his work among Norwegians in America.
- 1954 Percy Grainger, Australian composer and pianist
- 1964 Marianne Schigutt, Austrian diplomat
- 1969 Josef Knap, Czechoslovak poet
- 1976 Helen Svensson Fletre, Swedish born Norwegian-American journalist; In 1976, King Olav bestowed the St. Olav's medal on her - for her sesquicentennial work and for her many years of service to Norway. Wife of Norwegian Artist Lars Fletre
- 1989 Roald (Roy) Fridtjof Larsen, Røyken, Oppland, Norway. After Norwegian Navy service, raised Norge awareness and settled with his family in Bilgola, Australia.
- 1993 Margaret Miller, genealogist, Apple Valley, Minnesota
- 1994 Bradley Ellingboe, editor and translator, Albuquerque, New Mexico
- 1994 Kristin Brudevoll, former Director of Norla.
- 1995 Lyuba Gorlina, Russian translator
- 2002 Andrea Een, Hardanger fiddler, Northfield, Minnesota
- 2005 Stan Boreson, entertainer, Seattle, Washington
- 2008 Trygve Gunnar Morkemo
- 2010 Dean Madden for his contributions to the Vesterheim Museum
- 2014 Ewart Parkinson, OBE, town planner, Cardiff, Wales, for his role in saving and rebuilding the Norwegian Church in Cardiff Bay
- 2017 Glo Wollen, Petersburg, Alaska
- 2022 Nina Malterud, Norwegian ceramist

== See also ==
- Orders, decorations, and medals of Norway
