= EEN =

Een or EEN may refer to:

== People ==
- Andrea Een (born 1947), American musician and educator
- Robert Een (born 1952), American composer and musician

== Other uses ==
- Een, a village in the Netherlands
- VRT 1, formerly Één, a public Dutch-language TV station in Belgium
- Dillant–Hopkins Airport, serving Keene, New Hampshire, United States
- Eastern Educational Television Network, now American Public Television
- Enterprise Europe Network, an information and consultancy network
- Estradiol enanthate, an estrogen medication
