= Garfield Park, Chicago =

Garfield Park, Chicago may refer to:

- East Garfield Park, Chicago, a City of Chicago community area
- West Garfield Park, Chicago, a City of Chicago community area
- Garfield Park (Chicago park), a park in the East Garfield Park neighborhood of Chicago known for its conservatory
