= Lyuba Gorlina =

Russian translator

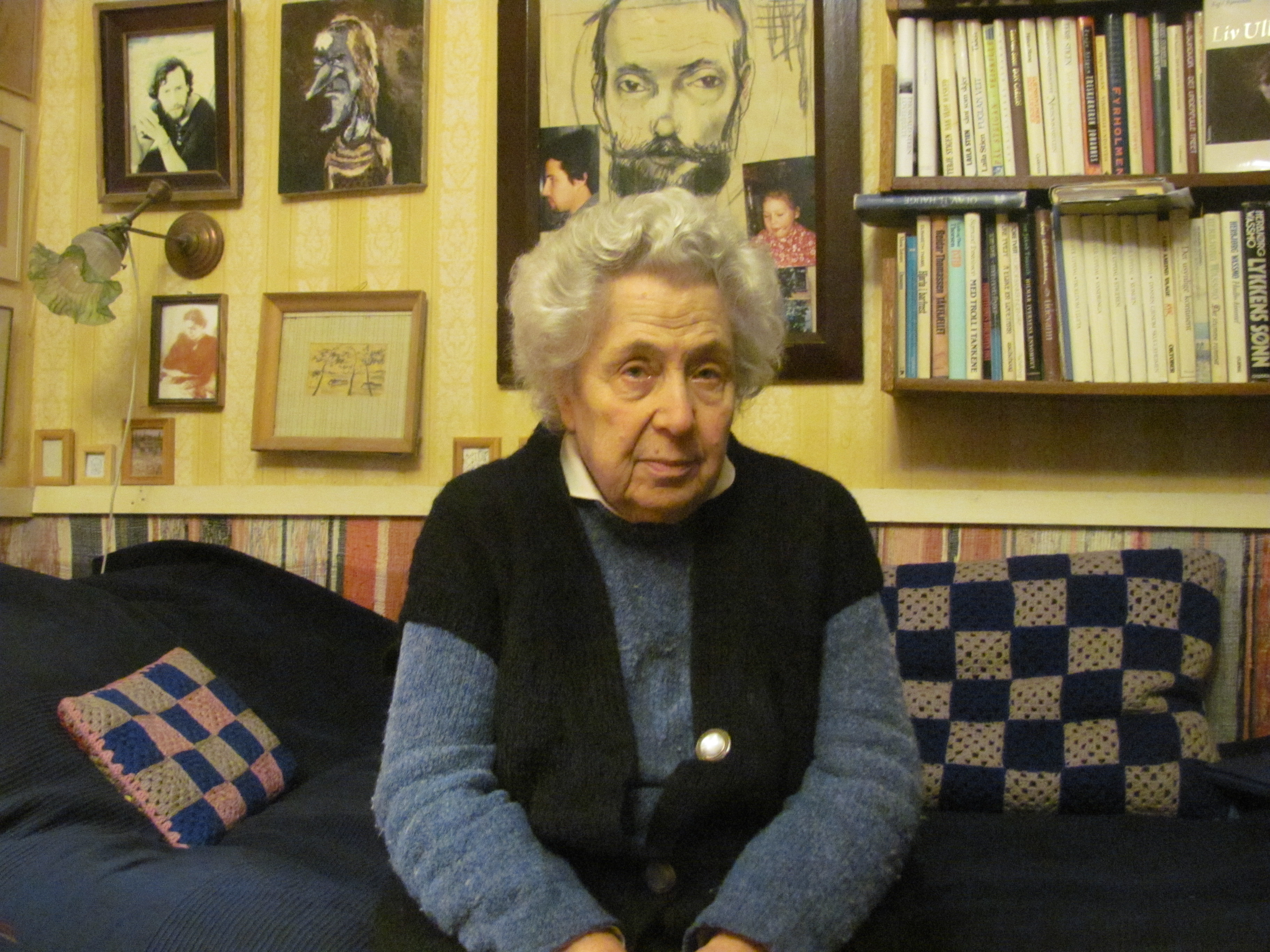
Lyuba Gorlina.

Lyubov "Lyuba" Gorlina (1926 – 2013) was a Russian translator.

She worked as a translator from Swedish and Norwegian to Russian since the 1950s. Her husband Yuri Vronskiy was a children's writer and translator. In the 1980s she held Tarjei Vesaas in the highest regard, but had also translated Bjørnstjerne Bjørnson, Aksel Sandemose, Torborg Nedreaas, Johan Borgen, Espen Haavardsholm, Jens Bjørneboe, Kåre Holt and Anne-Cath Vestly. In the post-Communist she described the publishing situation as problematic, struggling to find a publisher for her translations of Erik Fosnes Hansen, Tormod Haugen and Vera Henriksen.

Gorlina was portrayed twice by the Norwegian Broadcasting Corporation (NRK), a 15-minute radio special in 1988 (alongside colleague Lev Zhdanov) and the 30-minute television special Norsk litteratur er hele mitt liv in 1994. For her lifelong contributions to the propagation of Norwegian culture she was awarded the St. Olav's Medal in 1995. She died in 2013.
