= Illinois Centennial Monument =

Monument in Chicago, Illinois, United States

Illinois Centennial Memorial Column
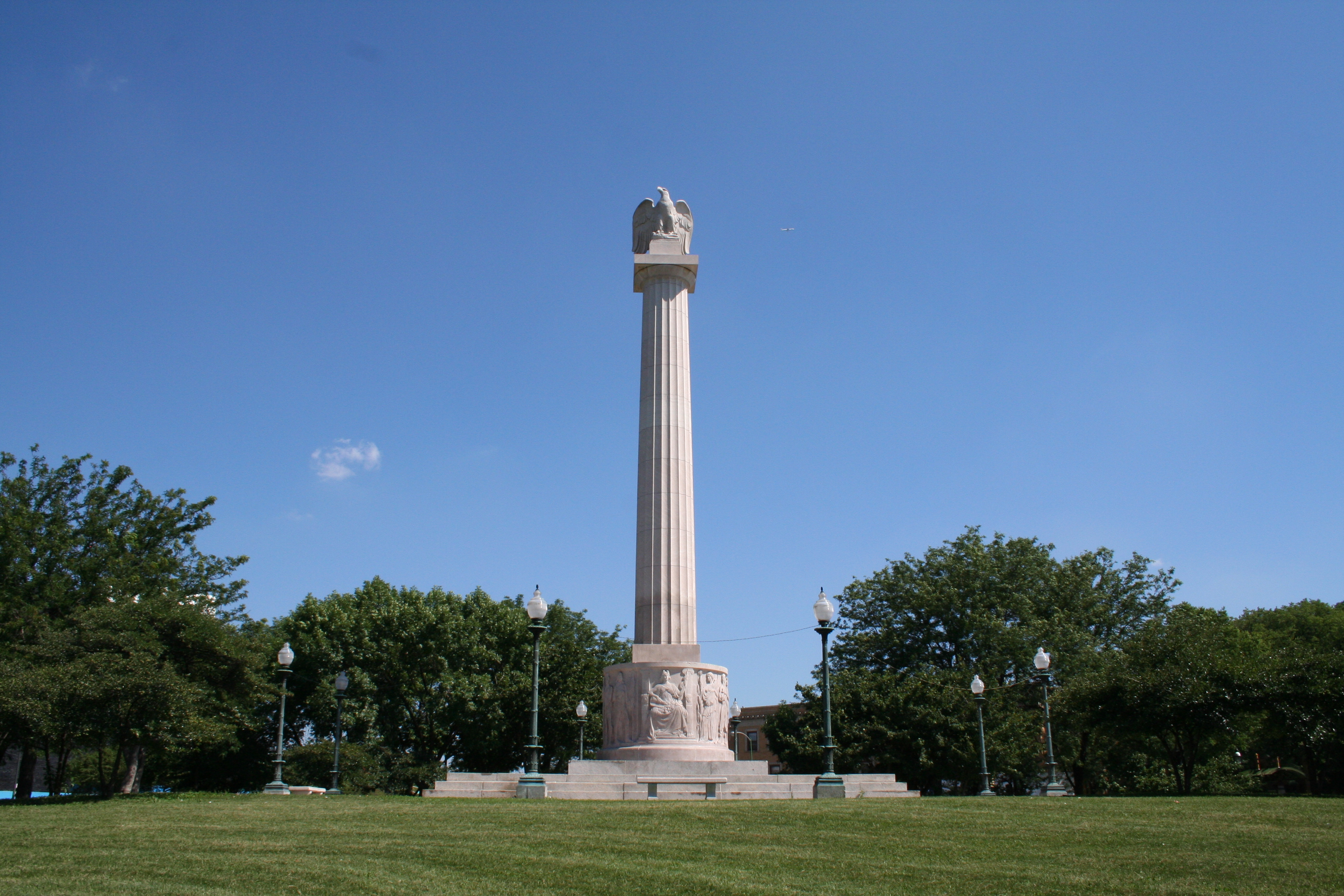
- The column in Logan Square
- Interactive map of Illinois Centennial Memorial Column
- Location: Logan Square, Chicago, Illinois, U.S.
- Coordinates: 41.9284°N 87.7073°W
- Designer: Henry Bacon (column); Evelyn Beatrice Longman (reliefs)
- Material: Tennessee marble
- Height: 70 ft (21 m)
- Opening date: 1918
- Dedicated to: Illinois Centennial

Illinois Centennial Memorial Column, also known as the Logan Square Monument or Illinois Centennial Monument, is a public monument in the Logan Square community area of Chicago, within the Chicago Landmark and National Register of Historic Places-listed Logan Square Boulevards Historic District. Built in 1918 to celebrate the 100th anniversary of Illinois' statehood, the monument was designed by Henry Bacon, architect of the Lincoln Memorial in Washington, D.C., and consists of a single 70-foot (21 m) marble Doric column topped by an eagle. Evelyn Beatrice Longman designed and sculpted the reliefs surrounding the base.

== History ==
The monument was funded by the Benjamin Ferguson Fund. In 1997 the Chicago Department of Transportation planted 81 trees around the column, including hackberry, Patmore green ash, Skyline honeylocust, red oak, swamp white oak, alpine currant, Virginia Rose and three varieties of hawthorns: downy, Washington and thornless cockspur.

== Description ==
The column is located at North Milwaukee Avenue and Logan Boulevard in the public square known as Logan Square, and is cased in Tennessee marble. It is composed of 13 solid marble segments and is based on the same proportions and scale as the columns that make up the colonnade of the Parthenon in Greece. Reliefs surrounding the base depict figures of Native Americans, explorers, farmers and laborers intended to show the great changes experienced during the state's first century, in reference to the Flag of Illinois; Daniel Boone, Hiawatha and Ceres are among those depicted. The column is opposed by a flagpole and a concrete plaque dedicated to American soldiers who died in World War I, World War II and the Korean War.
