= Middle Brow (restaurant) =

- Interactive map of Middle Brow

Restaurant information
- Established: 2019
- Food type: Pizza, baked goods
- Location: 2840 West Armitage Avenue, Chicago, Illinois, 60647, United States
- Coordinates: 41°55′04″N 87°41′56″W
- Website: middlebrowbeer.com

Middle Brow (or Middle Brow Beer Co.) is a brewery and winery based in the Logan Square neighborhood of Chicago, Illinois. Its restaurant and bakery, Bungalow by Middle Brow, also known as Middle Brow Bungalow, opened in 2019 and was included in The New York Times's 2024 list of the 22 best pizzerias in the United States.

== History ==
Middle Brow was founded as a beer company in 2011 by Pete Ternes and partners Bryan Grohnke and Nick Burica, and donated more than half of the gross profits from each beer release to local organizations focused on causes including women's health and violence prevention. The company opened its first brick-and-mortar location, Bungalow by Middle Brow, at 2840 West Armitage Avenue in Logan Square in early 2019. The restaurant operates as an all-day café and bakery, serving housemade bread, Neapolitan and tavern-style pizzas, and beer brewed on site.

Middle Brow began making wine in 2019, using grapes grown in Michigan. Its winemaking focuses on natural wines produced from hybrid grape varieties. In 2024, the company announced plans for a second location and wine production facility near Sawyer in southwest Michigan.

== Recognition ==
In 2024, The New York Times included Bungalow by Middle Brow in its list of the 22 best pizzerias in the United States, and Chicago magazine ranked it 21st on its list of the city's 50 best restaurants. Middle Brow was also a semifinalist for the 2024 James Beard Foundation Award for Outstanding Wine and Other Beverages Program.
