= Kristin Brudevoll =

Norwegian organizational leader

- Born: 4 January 1943 (age 83); Lillehammer, Norway
- Education: University of Arizona
- Occupation: Organizational leader
- Organization: NORLA (Norwegian Literature Abroad)
- Awards: St. Olav's Medal (1994); Fritt Ord Honorary Award (1998)

Kristin Brudevoll (born 4 January 1943) is a Norwegian literary scholar and organizational leader. She was the director of the Norla (Norwegian Literature Abroad).

== Early life ==
On 4 January 1943, Brudevoll was born in Lillehammer, Norway. In 1948, she moved with her family to Drammen.

She was a daughter of Øyvinn Bjarne Sannerud and Gerd Sofie Schye. In 1964 she married engineer Ulf Aakre Brudevoll.

== Education ==
Brudevoll studied literature at the University of Arizona, and teacher's education in Oslo.

== Career ==
Brudevoll is the director of the Norla (Norwegian Literature Abroad) from 1978 to 2006. Brudevoll has been a member of various committees for international cultural cooperation. She was awarded the St. Olav's Medal in 1994, and the Fritt Ord Honorary Award in 1998.
