= Nina Malterud =

Norwegian ceramist

Nina Malterud (born 1951) is a Norwegian ceramist. A graduate of the Norwegian National Academy of Craft and Art Industry, since 1975 she has created a variety of practical and artistic artefacts, both large and small, working mainly with blue clay. Applying her art to tiles, she has decorated public buildings including the University of Tromsø and the Courthouse in Sandvika. Malterud was head of ceramics at the Bergen Academy of Art and Design from 1994, serving as rector from 2002 to 2010. In 2022, she not only received the Ulrik Hendriksen Honorary Award but was honoured with the St. Olav's Medal.

== Early life ==
Born on 28 October 1951 in Oslo, Nina Malterud is the daughter of Olaf Malterud and his wife Tone née Mykland. She attended the Norwegian National Academy of Craft and Art Industry (1971–74), after which she spent a year gaining practical experience in the studio of the ceramist Lisbet Dæhlin.

== Career ==
In 1975, Malterud established a workshop in the Frysja district of Oslo. Working with blue clay, she has produced a wide variety of pottery, including bowls, dishes, jugs and cups. Inspired by folk art from around the world and by the use of colour in the Mediterranean countries, she has focused on artistic expression rather than function. Her later works, generally somewhat smaller, are glazed and decorated with patterns. From the 1980s, Malterud has decorated a number of public buildings, including the University of Tromsø (1981) and the Courthouse in Sandvika (1994), making use of tiles for the floors and walls as well as large jars for decoration.

In 1994, Malterud moved to Bergen where she headed the ceramics department at the Bergen Academy of Art and Design. She was appointed rector in 2002 until her retirement in 2010. From 2011, she has been active as an artisan in Bergen.

In recent years, Malterud has contributed significantly to the status of craftsmanship and has been influential in improving facilities at the university level in Norway and beyond. She has been a driving force on the board of Norske Kunsthåndverkere (NK) since its establishment in 1975, especially as head of the NK Foundation (2013–19). She has also contributed actively to the journal Kunsthåndverk which she helped to establish in 1980.

== Awards ==
For her contributions to Norwegian arts and crafts, Malterud has been honored with three major awards. In 2005, she received the Norske Kunsthåndverkere honorary award, and in 2022, she first received the Ulrik Hendriksen Honorary Award in April, and then in August she was honored with the St Olav's Medal.
