= Chicago park and boulevard system =

Parks and boulevards in Chicago

- Chicago Boulevard System Historic District
- U.S. National Register of Historic Places
- U.S. Historic district
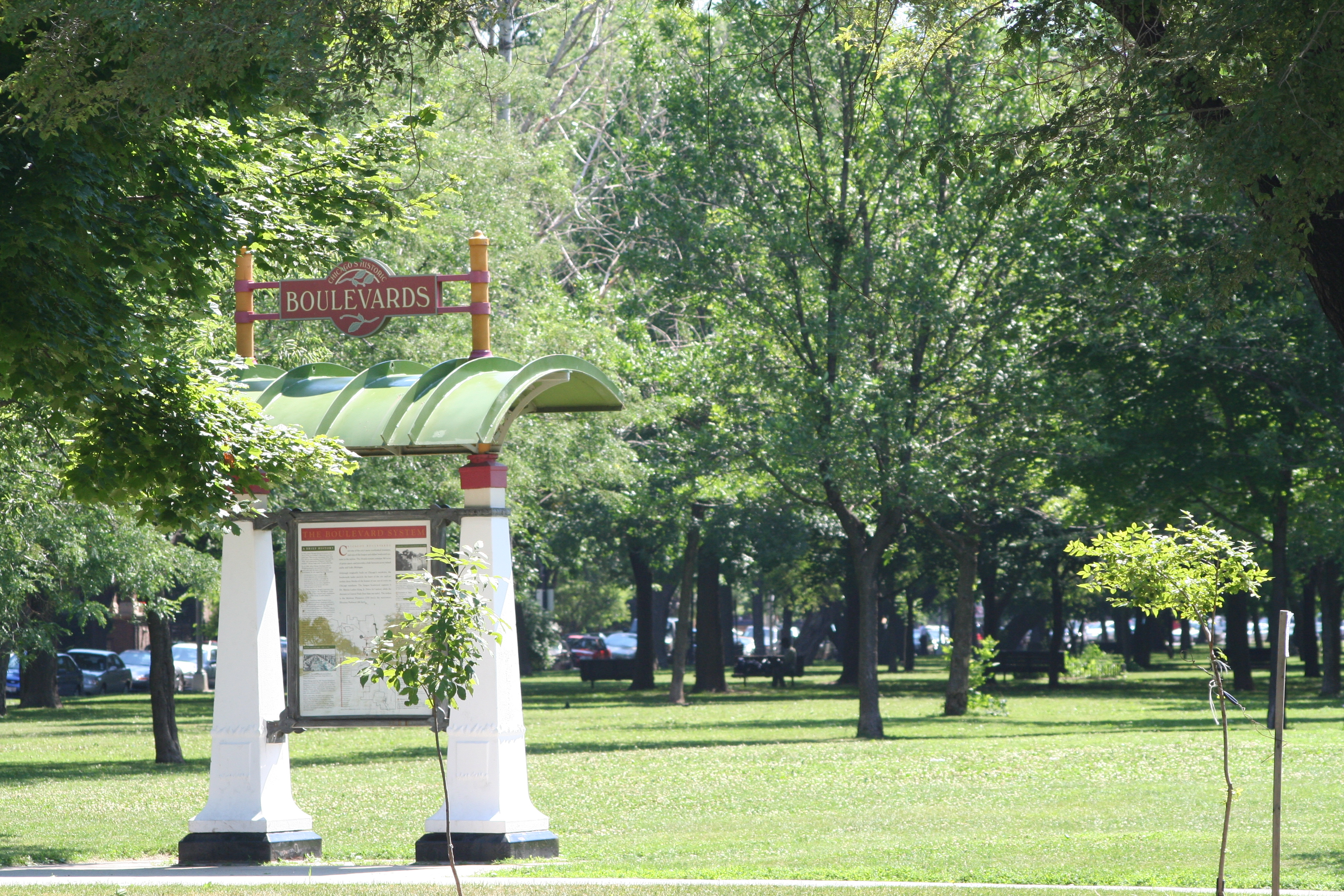
- A Chicago Boulevards information sign in Palmer Square park -- such markers with local information are found throughout the 26 miles of the system.
- Location: Chicago, Illinois
- Area: 26 linear miles
- Built: 1869-1942
- Architect: Daniel Burnham, William Le Baron Jenney Jens Jensen, Frederick Law Olmsted, Calvert Vaux
- NRHP reference No.: 12000040
- Added to NRHP: 2018

The historic Chicago park and boulevard system is a ring of parks connected by wide, planted-median boulevards that winds through the north, west, and south sides of the City of Chicago. Neighborhoods along this historic stretch include Logan Square, Humboldt Park, Garfield Park, Lawndale, Little Village, McKinley Park, Brighton Park, Gage Park, Englewood, Back of the Yards, and Bronzeville. Constructed from the 1870s through 1942, it reaches as far west as Garfield Park and turns south east to Douglass Park. In the south, it reaches Washington Park and Jackson Park, including the Midway Plaisance, used for the 1893 World's Fair.

In 2018, about 26 miles of the system was listed on the National Register of Historic Places as "the first comprehensive system of greenways for a major city in the United States."

== History ==
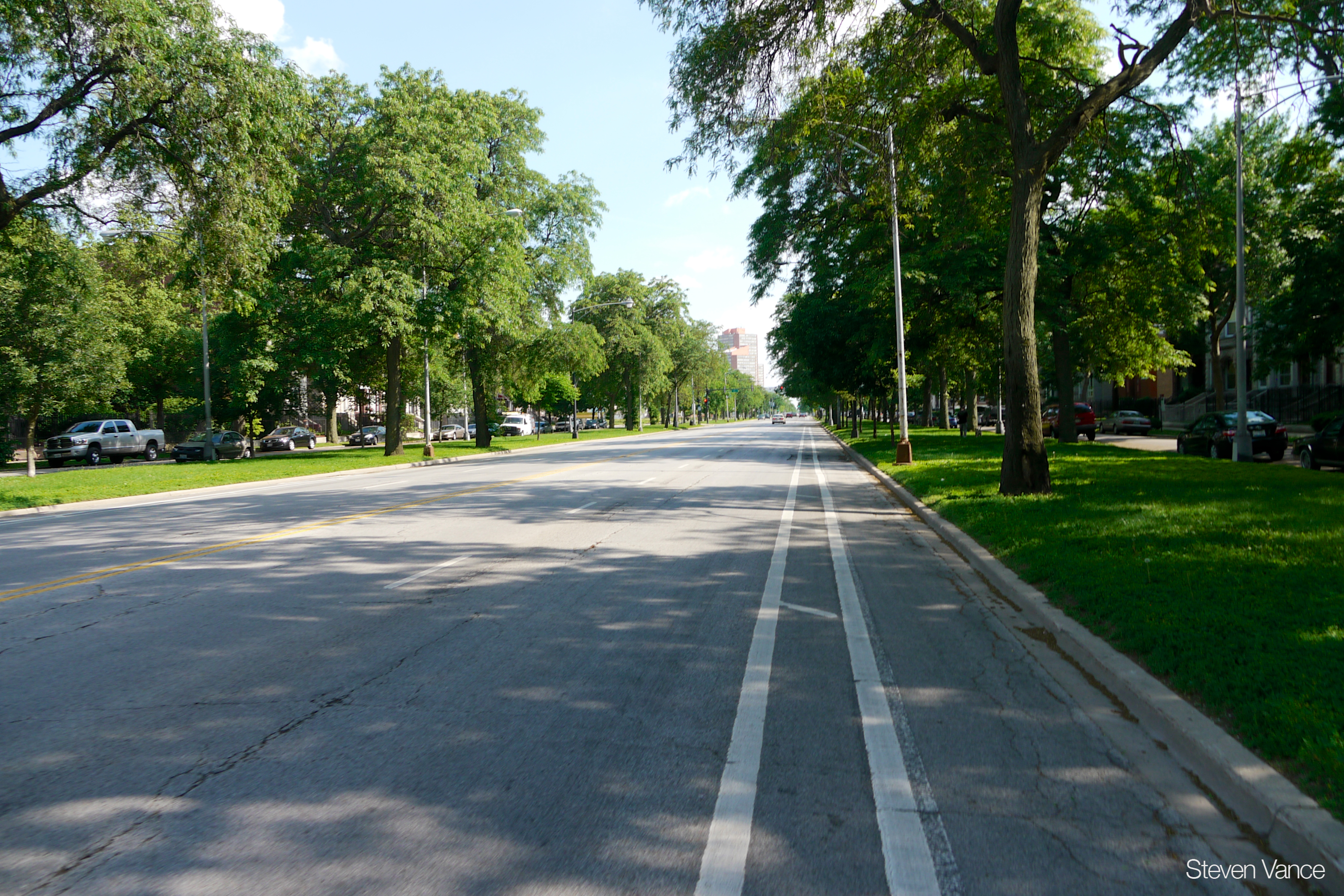
King Drive has two medians with trees planted in them. Parking is allowed on the side streets but not on the large central thoroughfare. Median configurations of one or two vary in different parts of the system

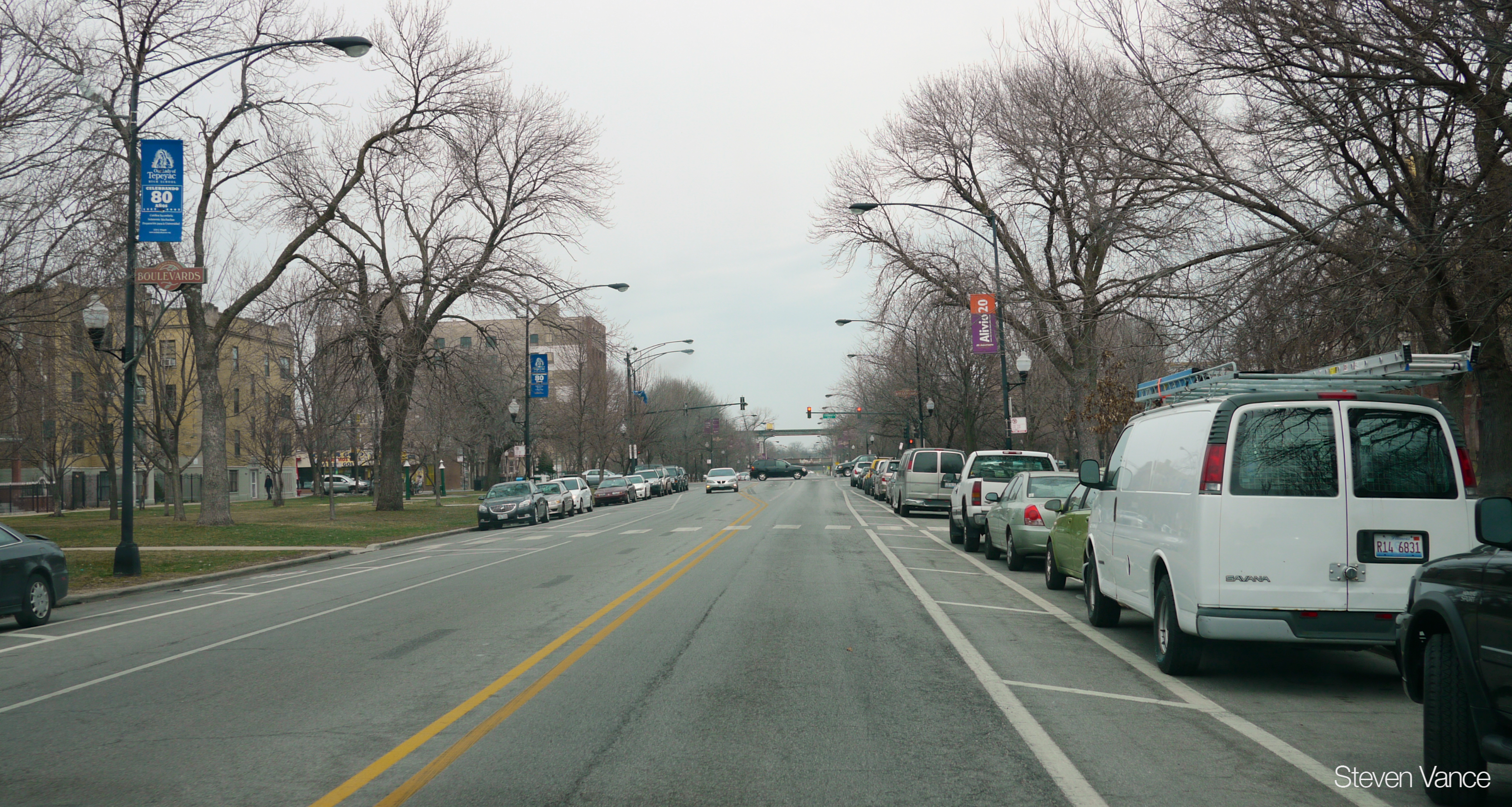
Marshall Boulevard, in the Little Village neighborhood. A sign on the lamppost on the left says "Chicago's historic boulevards". Behind and across blvd., several large Green Ash trees commemorated the nation's 1876 Centennial. They reached age 143, before succumbing to Emerald Ash Borers and were removed in 2016.

Incorporated as a city in 1837, Chicago and its developers confronted questions concerning the provision of urban parks and their relation to the city fabric. In 1849, John S. Wright, a real-estate investor, proposed an expansive system of parks connected by drives. The system was authorized by Illinois state legislation in 1869. The original plans foresaw a "ribbon of parks and pleasure drives encircling the city." The landscaped boulevards connecting the parks were themselves conceived as places of leisure activity, parks "spun out". While intended as a "unified park and boulevard system", it was to be developed by separate park commissions on the north, west and south sides of the city. A 2011 review describes its vision and realization:

This ambitious 26-mile system was created in response to the belief that it would not only help create healthful, accessible and livable neighborhoods, but would also spur residential real estate development in what was then the outskirts of the city. As anticipated, the park and boulevard system attracted real estate development and in the process created one of the city’s most recognizable and lasting urban features. The system is locally significant because, for the first time in Chicago, urban growth was thoughtfully planned and executed on a city-wide scale. The park and boulevard system not only provided a structure for orderly real estate development, it also provided an amenity that elevated the sophistication of the city by enriching both its visible character and its quality of life.

The South Park Commission's part of the system was designed by Olmsted, Vaux & Co. The firm's principals, Frederick Law Olmsted and Calvert Vaux, designed park and boulevard systems for Boston (its Emerald Necklace), Buffalo, and other cities. This part includes the Midway Plaisance and other areas used in the World's Columbian Exposition of 1893. The south side system included boulevards to Washington Park and Sherman Park.

The West Chicago Commission's section of the system was designed by William Le Baron Jenney. Extending from Logan Square, his 1871 plan linked Humboldt, Garfield and Douglas Parks.

The north-side park commission, known as the Lincoln Park Commission, failed in its plan to develop Diversey Parkway as a pleasure drive connection to the other park commissions' boulevard system. Legal action against the Lincoln Park Commission prevented progress until widening Diversey Avenue to near Logan Boulevard became impractical.

In 1934, the various park commissions were consolidated into the Chicago Park District. Almost all of the park and boulevard system's construction was completed by 1942. In 1959, the boulevard parts of the system were transferred from the Chicago Park District to the City of Chicago department in charge of streets—the Park District retaining only the parks. An international architectural-concept competition, Network Reset, awarded prizes in 2011 for "rethinking" the Chicago boulevards.

== Chicago Park Boulevard System Historic District ==
The Chicago Park Boulevard System Historic District, which encompasses most of the Boulevard System, was listed on the National Register of Historic Places in 2018. The approved listing, stretches about 26 miles, including 8 parks, 19 boulevards, and 6 squares, as well as adjacent properties that preserve structures built from the 19th century to the 1940s.

Part of the system was designated in 1985 as the Logan Square Boulevards Historic District, a linear historic district in the Logan Square community area of North Side, Chicago. It encompasses 2.5 miles (4.0 km) of the city's boulevard system and includes sections of Logan Boulevard, Kedzie Avenue, and Humboldt Boulevard. It also includes two parks, Logan Square and Palmer Square, which connect the boulevards. The Logan Square area boulevards pass through residential areas and are lined with homes in a variety of architectural styles. Four hundred buildings are designated "primary" and 118 are "secondary" contributing buildings in the district. Some of the most common designs are sandstone Romanesque houses, gray stone Victorian houses, and brick buildings with Tudor Revival and Prairie School styles.

Also included in the National Register district are several parks which are individually listed historic places: Garfield Park (listed in 1993), Humboldt Park (1992), Jackson Park and the Midway Plaisance (1972), Sherman Park (1990), and Washington Park (2004).
