= Lars Fletre =

Norwegian-American designer and sculptor

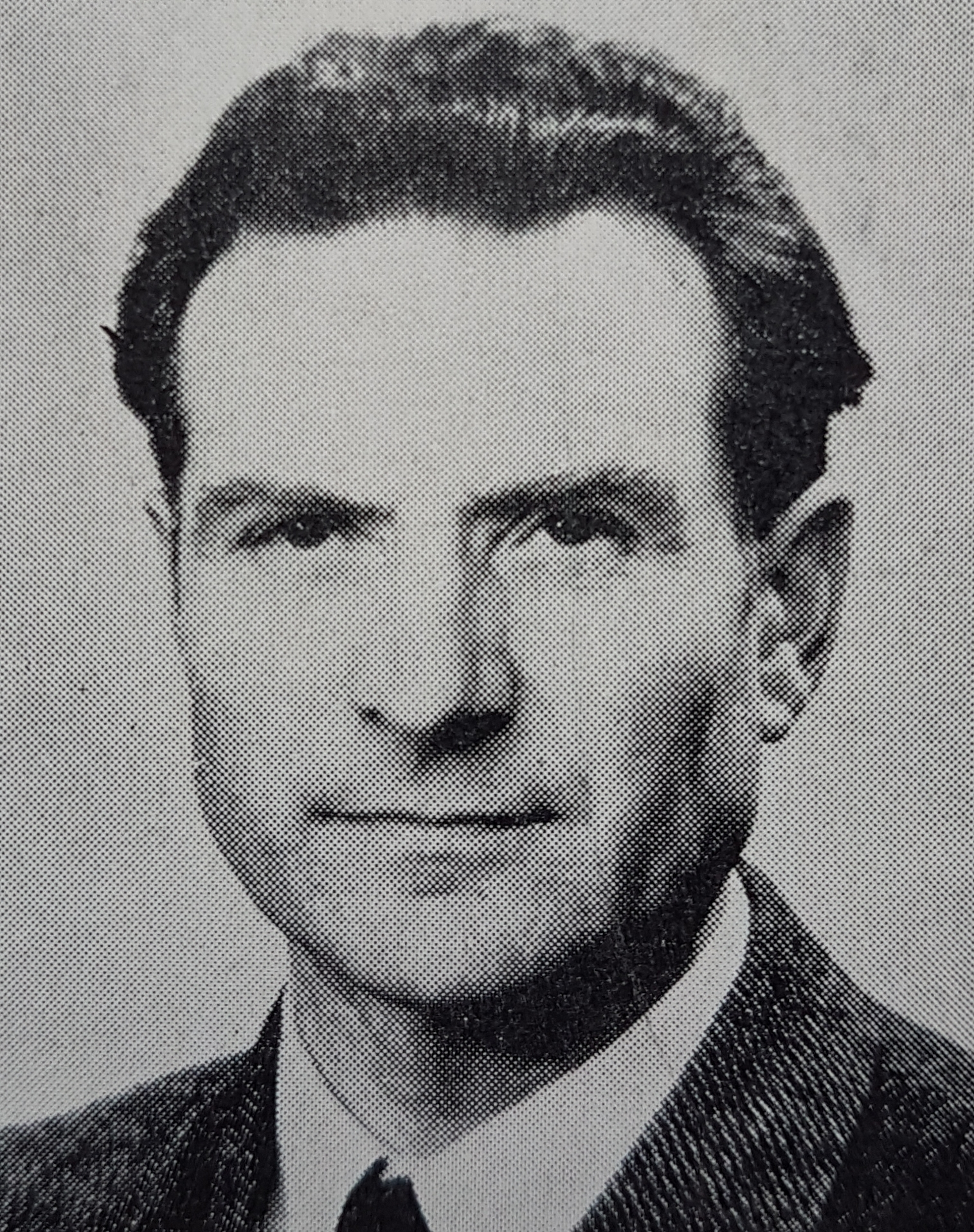
Lars Fletre

Lars Fletre (June 22, 1904 – September 9, 1977) was a prominent Norwegian-American designer and sculptor.

== Biography ==
Lars Olavson Fletre was born in Vossestrand Municipality in Søndre Bergenhus county, Norway. He was the youngest of seven children born to Ola Oddson Fletre and Kristine Olsdatter ytre Kvårmo.

Lars Fletre immigrated to Chicago in 1923 and attended the Chicago Art Institute from 1925 until 1931. He returned to Norway to marry Helen Svensson Fletre who he had first met in Chicago. The couple lived in Norway from 1934 (when they were married) to 1954. From 1941 to 1950 he worked as a designer, engraver and decorator for Hadeland Glassverk factory in Jevnaker. He and his family returned to the United States in 1954, where they resided in Chicago. Both Lars Fletre and Helen Svensson Fletre were prominent members of the Chicago Norwegian colony from 1954 when he and his wife settled there with their 3 children in Logan Square.

With Helen Svensson Fletre, he had three children (Anita, Oddgier, & Valborg) & five grandchildren (Steinar, Erik, Asia, Hjordis, & Bente) & five great grandchildren (Shane, Brandie, Roman, Lars, & Naomi) & 3 great-great grandchildren (Konnor, Camryn, & Kaden).

One of his more prominent works was a monument sculpted from granite for the fallen soldiers from the Fjordane Regiment, which included soldiers from Voss, Sogn, Hardanger, Sunnfjord, and Nordfjord. This memorial was unveiled at the former military camp at Bømoen in Voss on August 1, 1948. Some of Fletre's other work includes restored buildings in Florence, Italy as well as work on the National Cathedral in Washington, D.C. Additional he worked on churches and missions in Las Cruces, New Mexico and El Paso, Texas.

== Selected works ==
- The Vossing Correspondence Society of 1848 and the Report of Adam Løvenskjold

== Other sources ==
- Haugan, Reidar Rye Prominent Artists and Exhibits of Their Work in Chicago (Chicago Norske Klub. Nordmanns-Forbundet, 24: 371–374, Volume 7, 1933)
