= Adam Lizakowski =

Polish poet and photographer (born 1956)

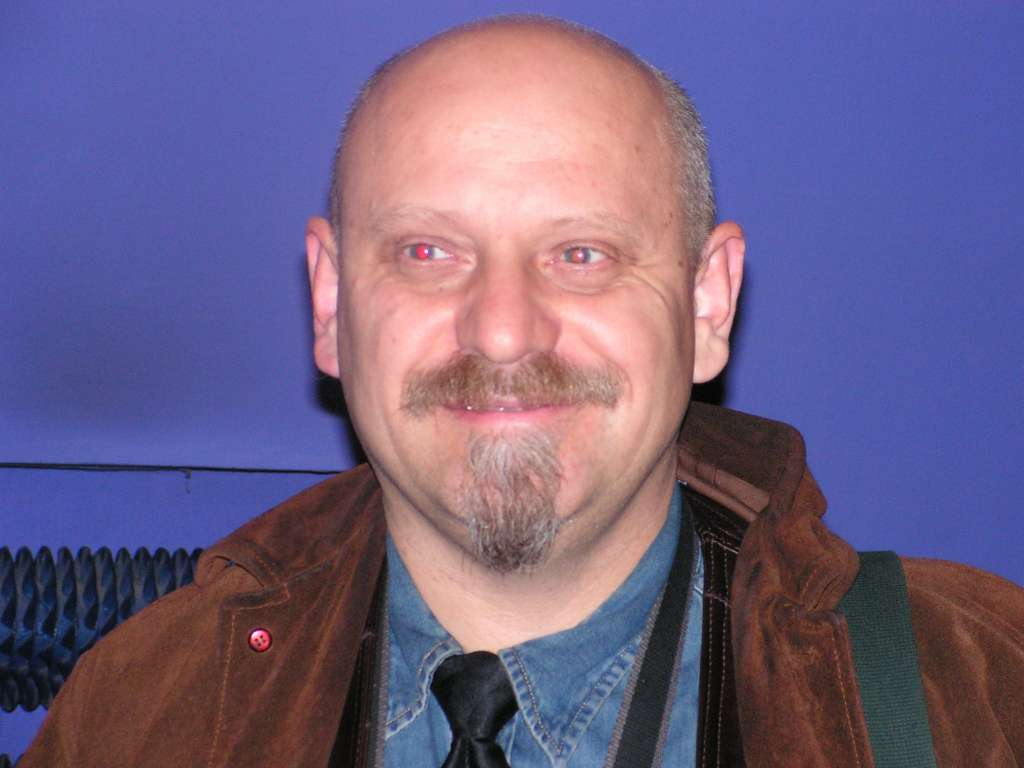
Adam Lizakowski

Adam Lizakowski (born December 24, 1956, in Dzierżoniów) is a Polish poet, translator, and photographer. His work has been published in over one hundred literary magazines in Poland and the United States.

== Biography ==
Born in Dzierżoniów. Lived in Pieszyce. Was outside of Poland when martial law was announced in December 1981. Received asylum in Austria in March 1982, then decided to emigrate to the USA in June of that year. Lived in San Francisco from 1982 to 1991, from where he moved to Chicago. Lizakowski founded the Unpaid Rent group, a collective of Polish language poets out of his home in Logan Square.

Lizakowski has translated numerous works by American Poets such as Walt Whitman, William C. Williams, Allen Ginsberg, Langston Hughes, Carl Sandburg and Bob Dylan. Also translated the works of Laozi as well as Rumi from English. Studied creative writing at Columbia College Chicago where he received a Bachelor of Arts degree and Northwestern University where he received his Masters. Among his instructors were noted American poets such as Tony Trigilio, David Trinidad, Ed Roberson and Reginald Gibbons.

== Literary works ==
=== Poetry ===
- Cannibalism Poetry (1984)
- Anteroon Poetry (1986)
- Wiersze Amerykańskie (1990)
- Złodzieje Czereśni wydanie amerykańskie. Wyd. Artex Publishing. Stevens Point (1990)
- Współczesny Prymitywizm WYd. Niezapłacony Rent. Chicago (1992)
- Nie Zapłacony Czynsz (1996)
- Na kalifornijskim brzegu (1996)
- Chicago Miasto Nadziei (1998)
- Złodzieje Czereśni, wydanie polskie (2000)
- Legenda o Poszukiwaniu Ojczyzny (2001)
- Chicago City of Hope in Poetry and Photography (2005)
- Dzieci Gór Sowich (2007)
- Chicago miasto wiary. City of belief. Wydawnictwo Książkowe IBIS. Wydanie dwujęzyczne. Warszawa (2008)
- Pieszyckie Łąki (2010)
- 156 Listów poetyckich z Chicago do Pieszyc Wyd. Urząd Miasta Pieszyce (2012)
- Bogaty Strumień – Dzierżoniów. Wyd. Urząd Miasta Dzierżoniów (2012)
- Wiersze spod Krzywej Wieży. Wyd. Urząd Miasta Ząbkowice Śląskie (2014)
- Bielawa. Randka Trzech Sylab". Wyd. Seria Sudecka proza i poezja. Bielawa (2014)
- 40 Listów Poetyckich z Chicago do Pieszyc; wydanie dwujęzyczne polsko-angielskie (2014)
- Dziennik pieszycki. Wyd. Seria Sudecka proza i poezja. Bielawa (2016)
- Jak zdobyto Dziki Zachód. Wiersze i poematy. Wyd.Wojewódzka Biblioteka Publiczna i Centrum Animacji Kultury w Poznaniu. (2017)

=== Prose ===
- "Kuzyn Józef albo emigracja loteryjna po roku 1989 do Ameryki, czyli wyprawa po złote runo. Wyd". Adam Marszałek. Toruń (2003)
- Zapiski znad Zatoki San Francisco". Wyd. Otwarty Rozdział. Rzeszów. (2004)

=== Publications ===
- Zapiski Znad Zatoki San Francisco w odcinkach w tygodniku „Gwiazda Polarna" – w latach 1995/1996 – wydawanym w Stevens Point w stanie Wisconsin. Redaktor naczelny Jacek Hilger.
- Zapiski Znad Zatoki San Francisco. Stowarzyszenie Literacko-Artystyczne FRAZA. Seria Biblioteka Fraza. Otwarty Rozdział. Rzeszów 2004.
- Zapiski Znad Zatoki San Francisco w odcinkach w tygodniku „Reklama" – w latach 2007/2008 – wydawanym w Chicago. Redaktor naczelny Wojciech Laskowski.
- Zapiski Znad Zatoki San Francisco w odcinkach w miesięczniku „Życie Kolorado" (od roku 2011) wydawanym w Denver w stanie Kolorado. Wydawca i redaktor Katarzyna Hypsher.
- Słownik Idiomów Amerykańskich, Wydawnictwo Grupa Poetycka Niezapłacony Rent. Chicago, 1996.
- Kuzyn Józef albo emigracja loteryjna po roku 1989 do Ameryki, czyli wyprawa po złote runo. Wydawnictwo Adam Marszałek. Toruń, 2003.
- Dziennik pieszycki. Seria Sudecka; poezja i proza tom XVII. Wydawnictwo: Miejska Biblioteka Publiczna w Bielawie. Bielawa, 2016.

== Literary Awards ==
- Golden Poetry Award – Sacramento (1987)
- Golden Poetry Award – Sacramento (1990)
- Międzynarodowy Konkurs Poetycki im. Marka Hłaski w Wiedniu (1990)
- Międzynarodowy Konkurs „Zachodnie losy Polaków” im. gen. Stanisława Maczka na pamiętnik emigranta z lat 1939–1989, pierwsza nagroda za „Zapiski znad Zatoki San Francisco” (1996)
- Nagroda Fundacji Władysława i Nelli Turzańskich z Kanady, przyznana za szczególne osiągnięcia w dziedzinie kultury polskiej. Adam Lizakowski otrzymał nagrodę za „całokształt twórczości poetyckiej, ze szczególnym uwzględnieniem tomów „Złodzieje czereśni. Wiersze i poematy” oraz „Legenda o poszukiwaniu ojczyzny”, charakteryzujących się „niezwykłą precyzją słowa i stanowiących oryginalną, inspirującą artystycznie formę ekspresji dla wyrażenia pełnej skali doświadczeń emigracyjnej egzystencji” (2000)
- „Laur UNESCO”. Nagrodę wręczono 10 kwietnia 2008 r. podczas inauguracji VIII Światowego Dnia Poezji, który organizowany jest pod patronatem Polskiego Komitetu ds. UNESCO i Ministra Kultury w Warszawie (2008)
- Pierwsze miejsce w konkursie pt. „Old Father William's Frabjous and Curious Poetry Contest”, organizowanym przez Caffeine Theatre w Chicago (2010)
- Pierwsze miejsce w konkursie organizowanym przez Columbia College Chicago, Department of English, School of Liberal Arts and Sciences Poetry Award (formerly the Elma Stuckey Poetry Award) ([2010)]
- The David R. Rubin Scholarship recipient. Chicago, 28 marca 2011.
- Nagroda im. Klemensa Janickiego. Bydgoszcz 2013 – w uznaniu zasług dla literatury polskiej. Jak zaznaczyła Kapituła w liście do poety: „Podkreślamy literackie i humanistyczne treści Pana twórczości i jesteśmy dumni, że znajdzie się Pan w gronie naszych laureatów”.
- Pierwsze miejsce w międzynarodowym konkursie dla Polaków pn. „Jeden Dzień. Polska, jaką pamiętam”. Australia, 2014 r.
- Nagroda Redakcji pisma Polonii w Austrii „JUPITER”, organu Klubu Inteligencji Polskiej w Austrii i Federacji Kongres Polonii w Austrii („redakcja pisma polonijnego „JUPITER” zorganizowała po raz dziesiąty Złote Sowy Polonii dla osób wyróżniających się nie tylko talentem i dokonaniami, aktywnością, kulturą osobistą, postawą moralną, ale i społeczną – życzliwością i umiejętnością współpracy z polonijnymi środowiskami. Działających ponad podziałami i broniących dobrego imienia Polski i Polaków na emigracji. Takie polonijne „Oskary”. Przyznawane Polonii przez Polonię – Adam Lizakowski, USA. Poeta – dziedzina literatury. Wiedeń, 21 marca 2015 r.”).
