= Logan Square Boulevards Historic District =

Historic district in Illinois, United States

- U.S. National Register of Historic Places
- U.S. Historic district
- Chicago Landmark
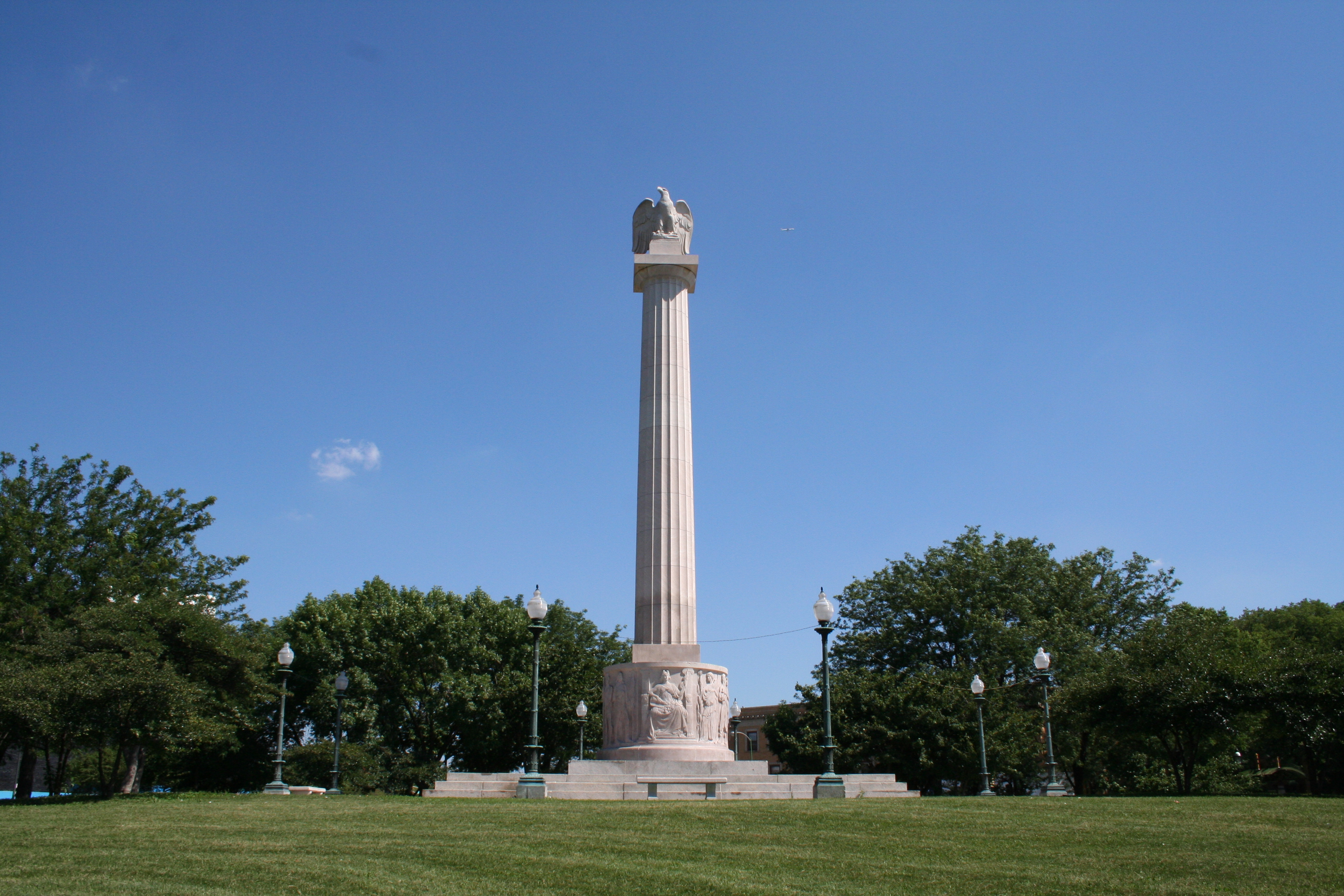
- The Illinois Centennial Monument

- Location within Chicago metropolitan area Location within Illinois Location within the United States
- Location: W. Logan Blvd., Logan Sq., N. Kedzie Blvd., Palmer Sq., and N. Humboldt Blvd., Chicago, Illinois
- Coordinates: 41°55′42″N 87°42′25″W
- Area: 265 acres (107 ha)
- NRHP reference No.: 85002901

Significant dates
- Added to NRHP: November 20, 1985
- Designated CHICL: November 1, 2005

The Logan Square Boulevards Historic District is a linear historic district in the Logan Square community area of North Side, Chicago. It encompasses 2.5 miles (4.0 km) of the Chicago boulevard system, including sections of Logan, Kedzie, Palmer, and Humboldt boulevards, as well as Logan Square and Palmer Square. The district was added to the National Register of Historic Places on November 20, 1985, and was designated a Chicago Landmark on November 1, 2005.

== History ==
The local boulevards were planned in 1869 as part of a state-authorized system of parks and connecting boulevards. The West Park Commission laid out the area’s parks and boulevards; architect William Le Baron Jenney designed them, and landscape architect Jens Jensen later revised the plan.

After Chicago annexed Jefferson Township in 1889, transportation improvements supported development along the boulevards. A streetcar line reached Logan Square in 1892, and an elevated rail line arrived in 1895. Between about 1890 and 1930, the boulevards gained single-family residences, flats, apartment buildings, and commercial, institutional, and religious buildings; the historic streetscapes were largely complete by the 1930s.

== Architecture and layout ==
Logan, Kedzie, and Humboldt boulevards each have two landscaped medians that separate their central carriageways from service lanes, while Palmer Boulevard has a single broad median. At the junction of Logan and Kedzie boulevards and Milwaukee Avenue, Logan Square contains the Illinois Centennial Monument.

The district's buildings include single-family houses, two- and three-flats, small apartment buildings, and institutional, religious, and commercial structures. Architectural styles include Romanesque Revival, Victorian, Tudor Revival, and Prairie School designs; graystone two- and three-flats are among its characteristic building types.

== Humboldt and Sacramento extension ==
On February 18, 2026, the City Council designated the Humboldt and Sacramento Extension to the Logan Square Boulevards District as a Chicago Landmark. The extension includes the 1600- to 1800-blocks of North Humboldt Boulevard, the 1000- to 1100-blocks of North Sacramento Avenue, and the east side of the 900-block of North Sacramento Boulevard.
