= Garfield Park (Chicago) =

Park in Chicago, Illinois

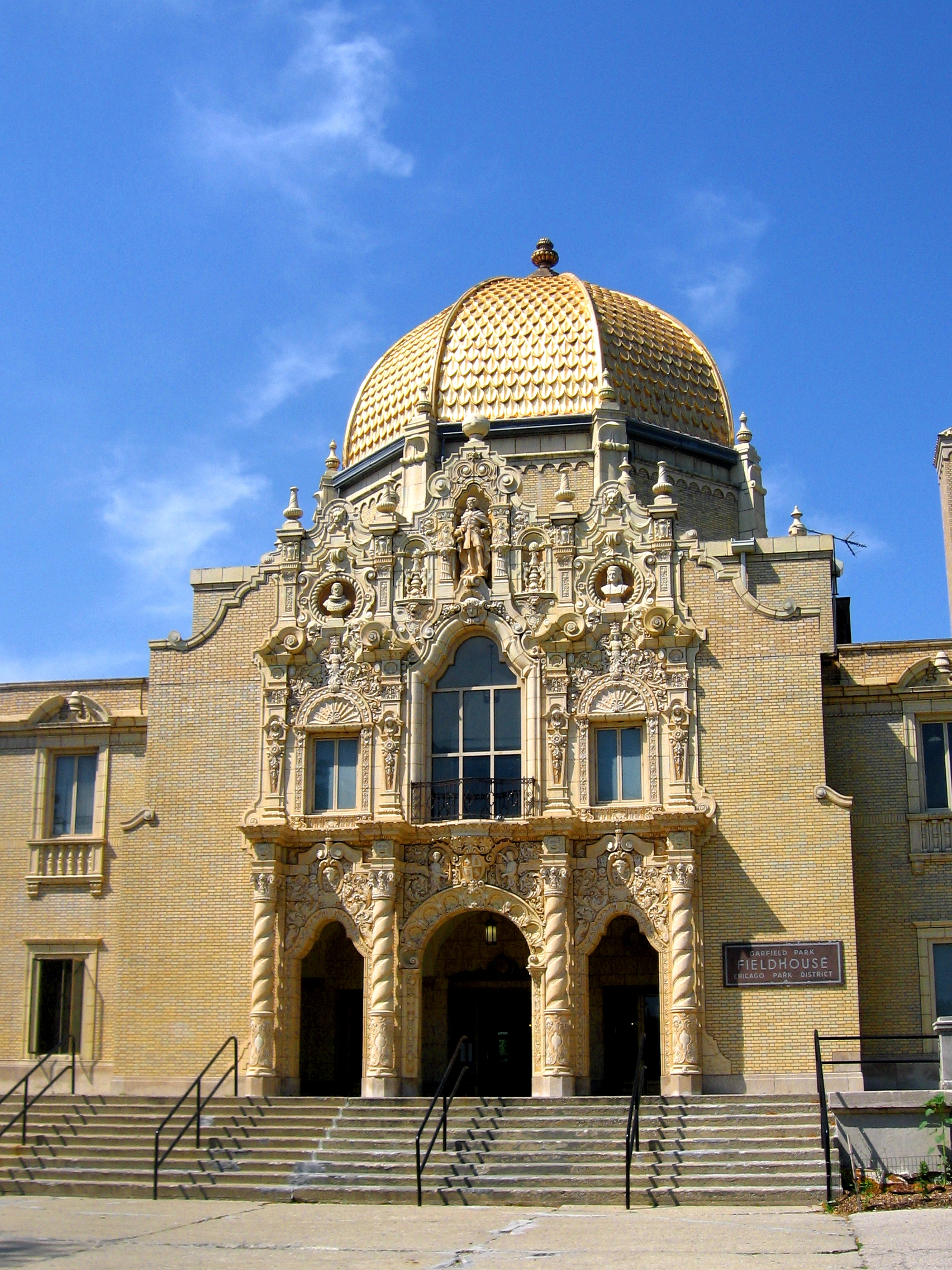
- The Garfield Park Fieldhouse
- Interactive map of Garfield Park
- Location: 300 N. Central Park Ave. Chicago, Illinois
- Coordinates: 41°53′11″N 87°43′2″W
- Area: 184 acres (0.74 km^{2})
- Opened: August 1874; 152 years ago
- Operator: Chicago Park District
- Garfield Park
- U.S. National Register of Historic Places
- U.S. Historic district
- Chicago Landmark
- Architect: William LeBaron Jenney, Hitchings and Company
- Architectural style: Exotic Revival, Colonial Revival
- NRHP reference No.: 93000837

Significant dates
- Added to NRHP: August 31, 1993
- Designated CHICL: November 18, 2009

Garfield Park is a 184-acre (0.74 km^{2}) urban park located in the East Garfield Park neighborhood on Chicago's West Side. It was designed as a pleasure ground by William LeBaron Jenney in the 1870s and is the oldest of the three original parks developed by the West Side parks commission on the Chicago park and boulevard plan (Humboldt Park, Garfield, and Douglass Park). It is home to the Garfield Park Conservatory, one of the largest plant conservatories in the United States. It is also the park furthest west in the Chicago park and boulevard system.

== Park history ==
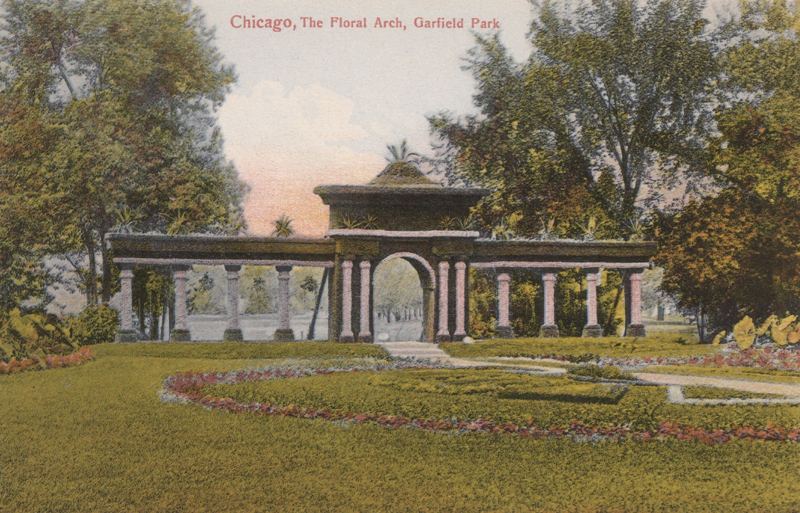
The Floral Arch, early 1900s

The first 40 acres (160,000 m^{2}) segment of Garfield Park was formally opened to the public in August 1874. Originally known as Central Park, it was conceived as the centerpiece of the West Park System.

Jenney, now best known as the father of skyscrapers, was influenced by the French parks and boulevards he had seen and studied while living in Paris. That influence is reflected in his design of these West side parks and the connecting boulevards. The park was renamed in 1881 in honor of slain President James A. Garfield.

In 1905, Jens Jensen, now known as the dean of Prairie-style landscape architecture, was appointed as the superintendent of the West Park System where he experimented with design ideas and improvements to the deteriorated and unfinished sections of Garfield Park. Some of the most notable areas are the existing lawns that became the setting for development of the Prairie style of landscape architecture. His most notable work in Garfield Park can be seen in the formal flower garden south of Madison Street, where he combined Prairie-style elements with traditional formal elements, and in the Conservatory.

Garfield Park was initially intended to be used for passive recreation such as strolling and picnicking. Jensen's expertise as an engineer led him to design a large lagoon as a means of draining the park site while creating the requisite water features. The lagoon was used for boating in summer and ice skating in winter.

Jensen's gardenesque approach to his parks endeared itself to those early park users as one of the first significant attempts at landscape art in Chicago. Throughout its history, Garfield Park has successfully responded to the changing demands placed on a highly used urban open space.

During the 1920s, a major addition was incorporated into Garfield Park: a grand, golden domed administration building for the West Park Commission designed by Michaelsen and Rognstad.

Following the 1934 consolidation of the separate Chicago parks commissions into the Chicago Park District, the "Golden Dome" became the park's fieldhouse and center of recreational programs and activities.

Despite additions and modifications in both landscape and buildings in Garfield Park, essential character-defining features such as historic roads and paths, buildings, structures, landforms, water features, and some plant materials still exist. Garfield Park remains as one of the best examples of William LeBaron Jenney's landscape architectural efforts in Chicago, and is a rich tapestry of the contributions of several nationally important designers, architects and artists.

Historic features of Garfield Park include architectural landscaping (flower gardens, water court, bridges, lagoons, and the Conservatory); notable architecture (the Golden Dome fieldhouse); the bandshell (or "gazebo" as it is locally known), designed in 1896 by J. L. Silsbee; and the golf shelter building, attributable to prairie school architect Hugh Gardner and built in 1907. There are also a number of historic sculptures and statues within the park.

Recreational features include baseball and soccer fields, tennis and basketball courts, a swimming pool, playgrounds and an ice skating rink. The Golden Dome houses an Olympic-sized gymnasium, gymnastic and fitness centers, boxing ring, and theater. Park patrons can participate in programs for everyone from senior citizens to pre-schoolers, including picnicking, outdoor concerts, and community festivals.

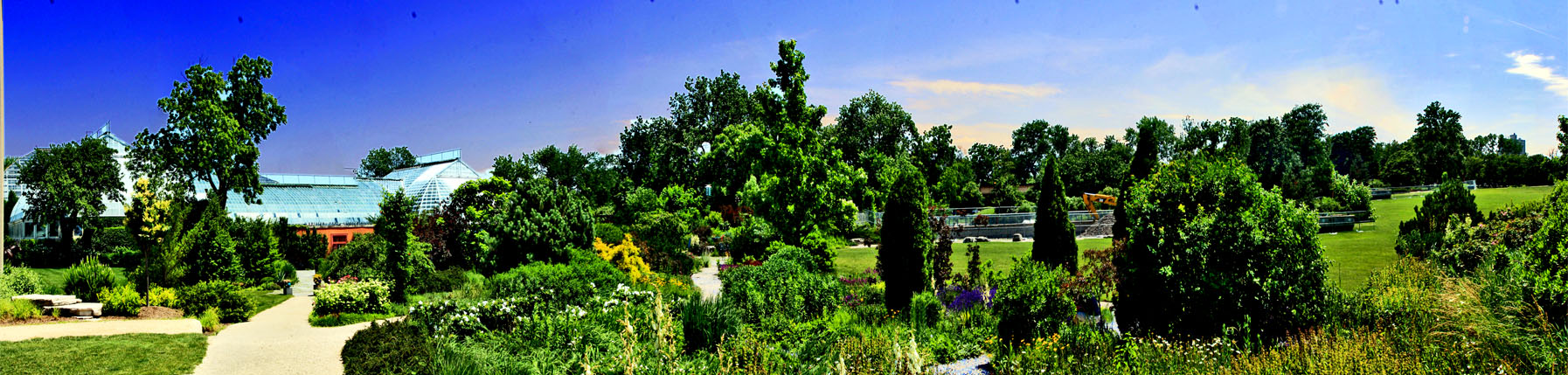
Panorama of the gardens in 2013

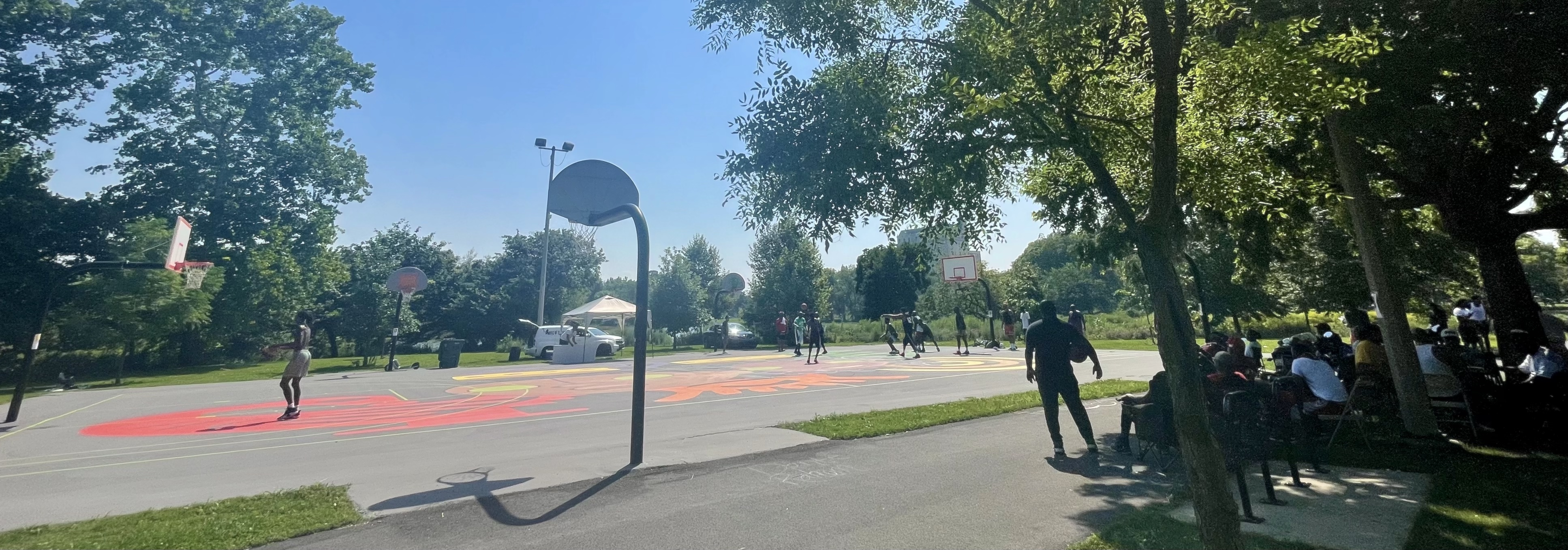
People playing basketball and spectating near the court

== Race track ==
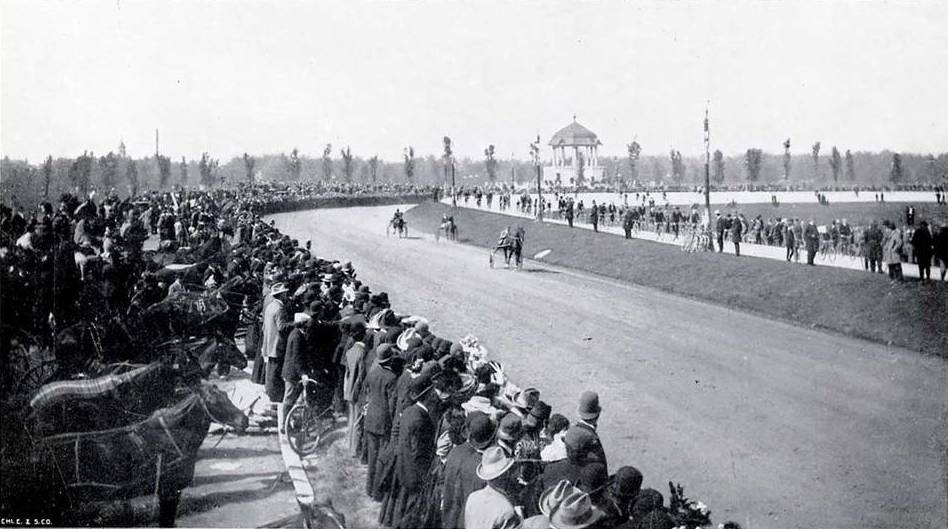
Garfield Park's double-ring race track for horses and cyclists c. 1896 which was removed in 1905

Located in the south of Garfield Park from 1896 to 1905 was a double-ring race track for horses and cyclists.

== Conservatory ==
The Garfield Park Conservatory, designed by landscape architect Jens Jensen in 1906–07, is a 4.5-acre (1.8 ha) greenhouse conservatory at the northwest corner of the park.

== See also ==
- List of botanical gardens in the United States
- List of museums and cultural institutions in Chicago
