= Andrea Een =

American musician, composer and poet (born 1947)

- Born: 22 January 1947 (age 79)
- Origin: United States
- Genres: Classical; folk
- Occupations: Musician; composer
- Instruments: Violin; viola; Hardanger fiddle
- Website: www.andreaeen.com

Andrea Een (born January 22, 1947) is an American musician and composer who served as Professor Emerita of Music at St. Olaf College.

== Career ==
Een is a founding member of the Hardanger Fiddle Association of America. In 2002, she was awarded St. Olav's Medal by H.M. Harald V of Norway for helping to reintroduce the Norwegian Hardanger fiddle tradition to the United States. She received the Ole Bull Award, from the eponymous academy in Voss, Norway, in 1987, and was accredited as a Master Folk Artist Teacher by the Minnesota State Arts Board in 1998.

She was a professor of music at St. Olaf College from 1977 to 2012 and conducted the St. Olaf Chamber Orchestra (now Philharmonia) from 1977 to 1994. She was also a member of the Minnesota Opera Orchestra from 1985 to 2013 and has performed with VocalEssence, directed by Philip Brunelle, since 1985. She appears on their Grammy-nominated recording of Aaron Copland's The Tender Land and Gramophone-winning Paul Bunyan by Benjamin Britten.

In 2004, she released an album of traditional and original compositions for Hardanger fiddle titled From the Valley. One work from the CD, "President Thomforde's March," was written for and premiered at St. Olaf College Inauguration Weekend in April 2000.

Een earned a Doctorate of Musical Arts in violin performance and literature at the University of Illinois Urbana-Champaign where she studied with Paul Rolland. Her dissertation "Comparison of Melodic Variants in the Hardingfele Repertoire of Norway" was advised by ethnomusicologist Bruno Nettl.

On January 20, 2007, Een demonstrated the Hardanger fiddle at the Highview Lutheran Church.

== Personal life ==
Een is the granddaughter of Norwegian and German immigrants and grew up in Mankato, Minnesota. Her brother is the composer and cellist Robert Een. She has one son.

== Awards ==
- 1987 Ole Bull Award from Ole Bull Academy Voss, Norway
- 1998 Master Folk Artist Award from Minnesota State Arts Board
- 2002 St. Olav's Medal from King Harald V of Norway

== Discography ==
=== Hardanger Fiddle ===
- Norwegian-American Music from Minnesota (1987), Minnesota State Arts Board
- From the Valley (2004), solo recording

=== Violin and Viola ===
- Lake Wobegon (1994) with Garrison Keillor
- The Tender Land with Plymouth Music Series (1990)
- Paul Bunyan with Plymouth Music Series (1987)

== Publications ==
- Some Days We Name It Love (Heywood Press, 1994)
- The Quick and the Dead (Minnesota Valley Review, 1992)
- Penchant: Anthology of Northfield Women Poets (Heywood Press, 2005)
