= Logan Square, Chicago =

Community area in Chicago, Illinois

Logan Square
- Community area
- Community Area 22 – Logan Square
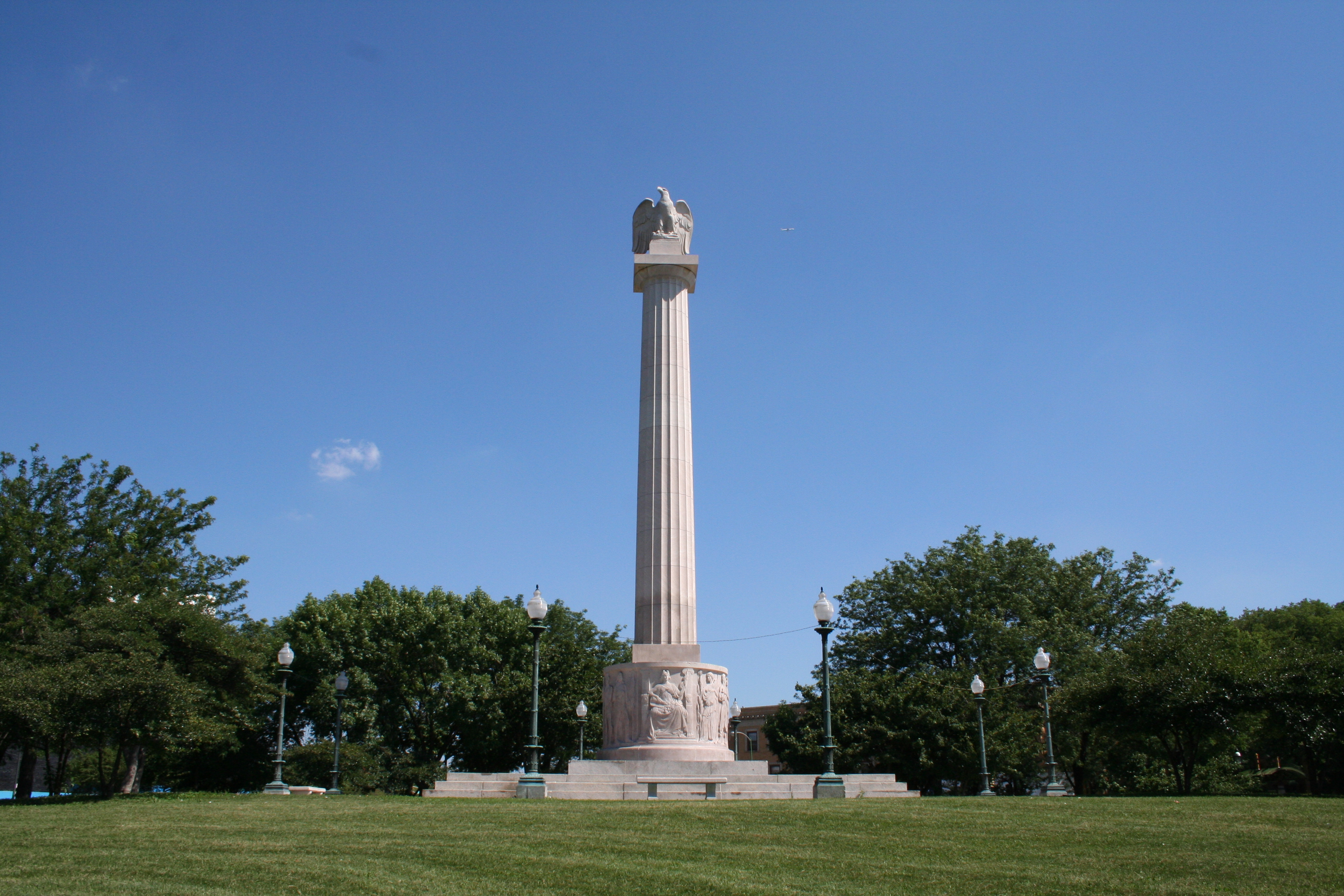
- Illinois Centennial Memorial in neighborhood namesake Logan Square

- Location within the city of Chicago
- Coordinates: 41°55.7′N 87°42.4′W
- Country: United States
- State: Illinois
- County: Cook
- City: Chicago
- Named for: John A. Logan
- Neighborhoods: List: Logan Square; Bucktown; Palmer Square; Kosciuszko Park

Area
  - Total: 3.23 sq mi (8.37 km^{2})

Population (2024)
  - Total: 71,192
  - Density: 22,000/sq mi (8,510/km^{2})

Demographics (2024)
  - White: 52.4%
  - Black: 5.8%
  - Hispanic: 33.0%
  - Asian: 4.7%
  - Other: 4.1%

Educational Attainment 2024
  - High School Diploma or Higher: 92.8%
  - Bachelor's Degree or Higher: 63.3%
- Time zone: UTC−6 (CST)
  - Summer (DST): UTC−5 (CDT)
- ZIP Codes: parts of 60614, 60618, 60622, 60639, 60647
- Median household income (2024): $107,916
- Source: Chicago Metropolitan Agency for Planning (CMAP) July 2022 Release

Logan Square is one of the 77 community areas of Chicago in Illinois, United States.

The Logan Square neighborhood, located within the Logan Square community area, is centered on the public square that serves as its namesake, located at the three-way intersection of Milwaukee Avenue, Logan Boulevard and Kedzie Boulevard.

Logan Square is, in general, bounded by Metra's Milwaukee District North Line on the west, the North Branch of the Chicago River on the east, Diversey Parkway on the north, and the Bloomingdale Trail (also known as "The 606") on the south. The area is characterized by the prominent historical boulevards, stately greystones and large bungalow-style homes.

The community area consists of the neighborhoods Logan Square, Bucktown, Palmer Square, and Kosciuszko Park. As of 2024, it had a population of 71,192. The area was originally settled largely by Norwegian, Danish, Polish, and Jewish immigrants beginning in the 19th century; it is now home to a large Latino community as well as a growing number of young professionals as a result of gentrification. The Logan Square Boulevards Historic District, encompassing the area's boulevards and namesake squares, was added to the National Register of Historic Places in 1985 and designated a Chicago Landmark in 2005.

== History ==
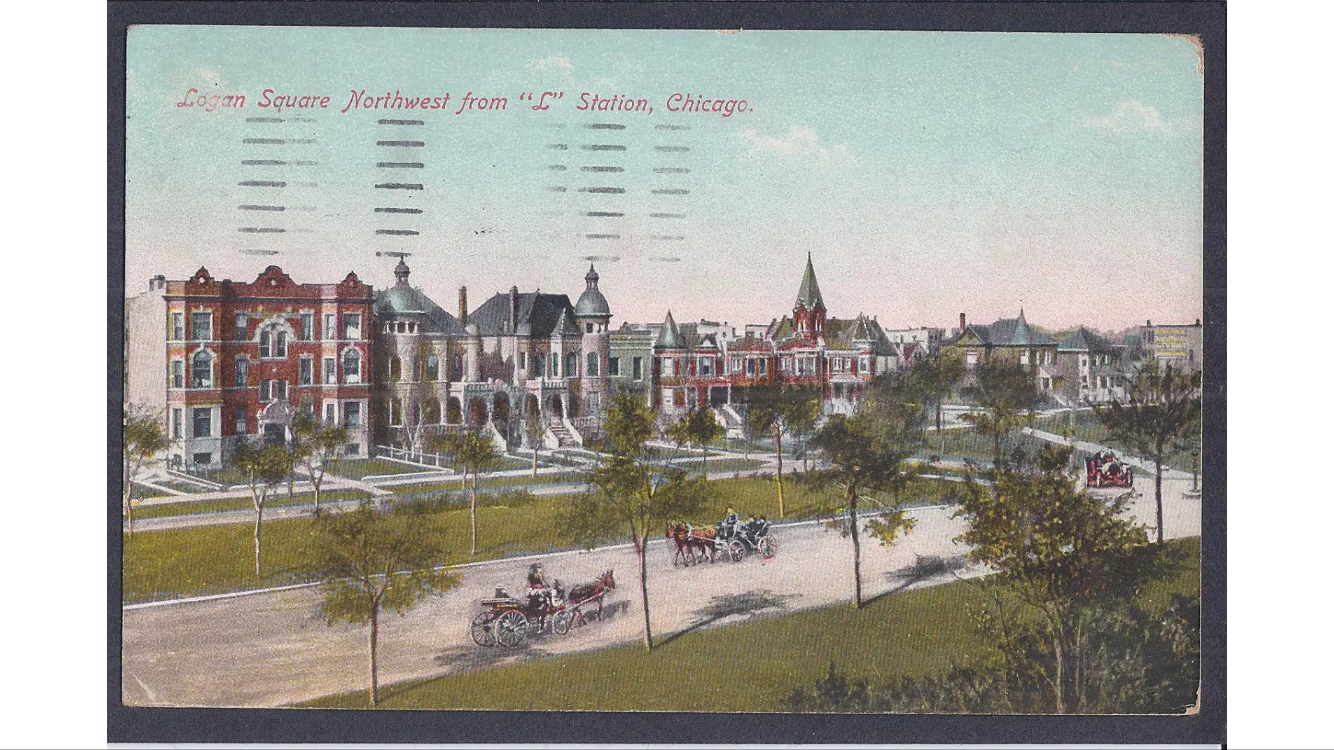
Logan Square circa 1909

=== Name and Centennial Monument ===
Logan Square is named after General John A. Logan, an American soldier and political leader. The square itself is a large public green space (designed by architect William Le Baron Jenney, landscape architect Jens Jensen and others) formed as the grand northwest terminus of the Chicago Boulevard System and the junction of Kedzie and Logan Boulevards and Milwaukee Avenue. At the center of the square is the Illinois Centennial Monument, built in 1918 to commemorate the 100th anniversary of Illinois's statehood (geographic coordinates as shown above for this article). The monument, designed by Henry Bacon, architect of the Lincoln Memorial in Washington, D.C., and sculpted by Evelyn Beatrice Longman, is a single 70-foot (21 m) tall "Tennessee-pink" marble Doric column, based upon the same proportions as the columns of the Parthenon in Ancient Greece, and topped by an eagle, in reference to the state flag and symbol of the state and the nation. The monument was funded by the Benjamin Ferguson Fund. Reliefs surrounding the base depict allegorical figures of Native Americans, explorers, Jesuit missionaries, farmers, and laborers intended to represent Illinois contributions to the nation through transportation as a railroad crossroads for passengers and freight (represented by a train extending across the arm of one of the figures), education, commerce, grain and commodities, religion and exploration, along with the "pioneering spirit" during the state's first century.

=== Development ===
Originally developed by early settlers like Martin Kimbell (of Kimball Avenue fame) in the 1830s, forming around the towns of "Jefferson", "Maplewood", and "Avondale", the area was annexed into the city of Chicago in 1889 and renamed Logan Square. Many of its early residents were English or Scandinavian origin, mostly Norwegians and Danes, along with both a significant Polish and Jewish population that followed.

Milwaukee Avenue, which spans the community, is one of the oldest roads in the area and remains both a cultural and commercial artery. The road traces its origins prior to 1830 as a Native American trail and became known as "Northwest Plank Road" when it was constructed with wooden boards in 1849. In 1892, a streetcar line was extended along Milwaukee Avenue and, in 1895, the electrified elevated rail line (today's Blue Line) was built alongside the road up to Logan Square itself, stimulating a new building boom. Milwaukee Avenue was finally paved in 1911 to accommodate motor cars. A baseball stadium at the corner of Milwaukee and Diversey hosted the Logan Square Baseball Club, which defeated both the Chicago Cubs and White Sox, who had just played each other in the crosstown 1906 World Series.

Historical population
Census	Pop.	Note	%±
1930	114,174		—
1940	110,010		−3.6%
1950	106,763		−3.0%
1960	94,799		−11.2%
1970	88,462		−6.7%
1980	84,768		−4.2%
1990	82,605		−2.6%
2000	82,685		0.1%
2010	73,595		−11.0%
2020	71,665		−2.6%
2024 (est.)	71,192		−0.7%

=== 21st century ===
The neighborhood is home to a diverse population including an established Latino community (primarily Mexican and Puerto Rican, with some Cuban), a number of ethnicities from Eastern Europe (mostly Poles), and a growing number of millennials, due to gentrification. Known as the Logan Square Boulevards District, the area was listed on the National Register of Historic Places in 1985 and became a protected Chicago Landmark in 2005.

In 2024, The New York Times included Bungalow by Middle Brow, a brewery and pizzeria in the neighborhood, in its list of the 22 best pizzerias in the United States.

== Neighborhoods ==
=== Bucktown ===
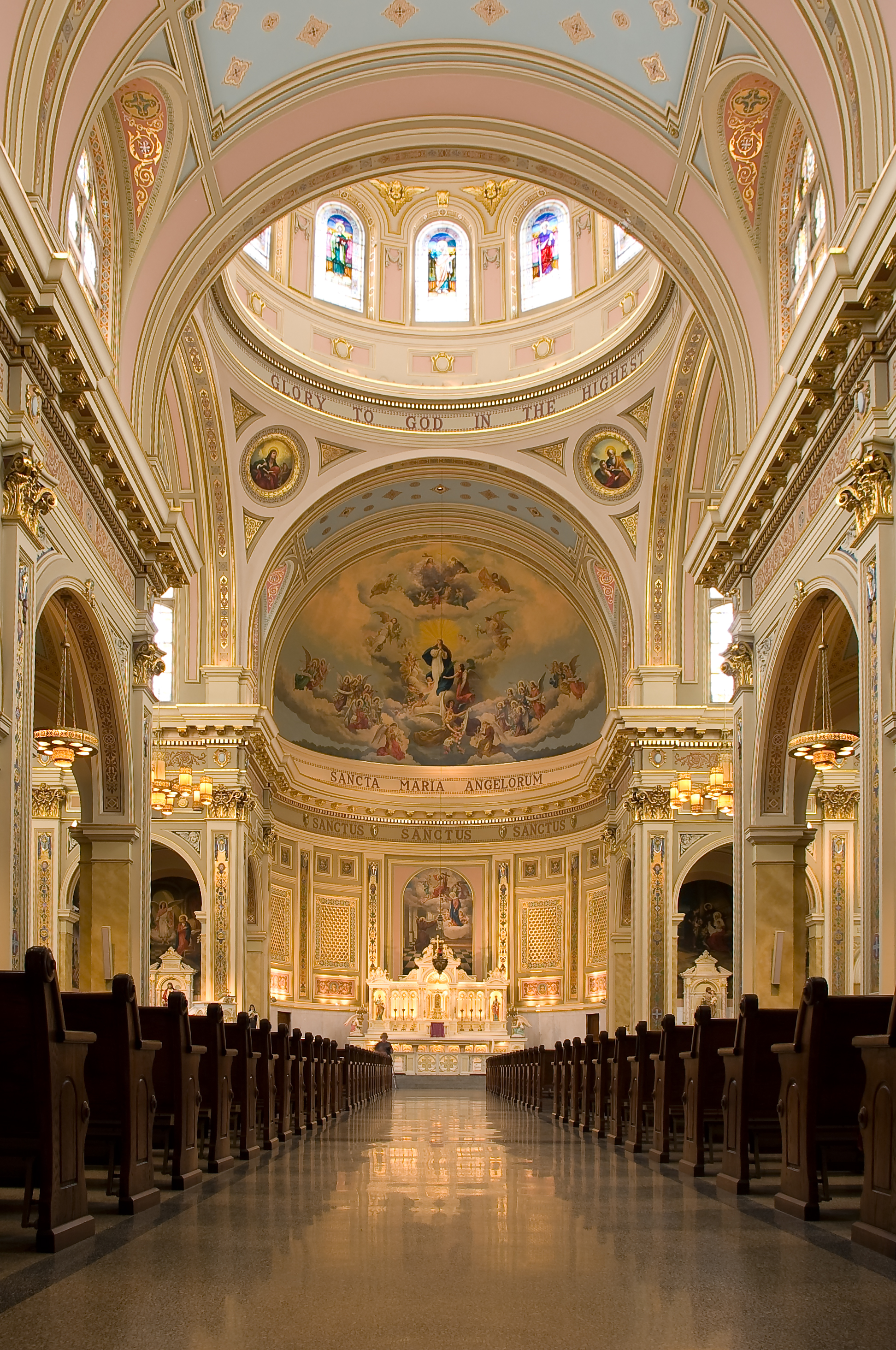
St. Mary of the Angels is one of the three "Polish Cathedrals" located in Bucktown.

Bucktown is a neighborhood located in the east of the Logan Square community area in Chicago, directly north of Wicker Park, and northwest of the Loop. Bucktown gets its name from the large number of goats raised in the neighborhood during the 19th century when it was an integral part of the city's Polish Downtown. The original Polish term for the neighborhood was Kozie Prery (Goat Prairie). Its boundaries are Fullerton Avenue to the north, Western Avenue to the west, Bloomingdale or North Avenue to the south, and the Kennedy Expressway to the east. Bucktown's original boundaries were Fullerton Avenue, Damen Avenue (formerly Robey Street), Armitage Avenue and Western Avenue.

Horween Leather Company has been on North Elston Avenue in Bucktown since 1920. The neighborhood's origins are rooted in the Polish working class, which first began to settle in the area in the 1830s. A large influx of Germans began in 1848 and in 1854 led to the establishment of the town of Holstein, which was eventually annexed into Chicago in 1863. In the 1890s and 1900s, immigration from Poland, the annexation of Jefferson Township into Chicago and the completion of the Logan Square Branch of the Metropolitan Elevated Lines contributed to the rapid increase in Bucktown's population density. Three churches designed in the so-called "Polish cathedral style" – St. Hedwig's Church, the former Cathedral of All Saints (now Covenant Presbyterian Church) and St. Mary of the Angels – date from this era.

Early Polish resident of Bucktown gave Polish names to the streets such as Kosciusko, Sobieski, Pulaski and Leipzig (after the Battle of Leipzig). An influential group of German-Americans persuaded the Chicago City Council to rename them after German cities Hamburg, Frankfort, Berlin and Holstein. Anti-German sentiment during World War I brought about another name change that led to the current names: McLean, Shakespeare, Charleston, and Palmer.

Polish immigration into the area accelerated during and after World War II when as many as 150,000 Poles are estimated to have arrived in Polish Downtown between 1939 and 1959 as displaced persons. Milwaukee Avenue was the anchor of the city's "Polish Corridor", a contiguous area of Polish settlement that extended from Polonia Triangle to Avondale's Polish Village. Additional population influxes into the area at this time included European Jews and Belarusians.

Latino migration to the area began in the 1960s with the arrival of Cuban, Puerto Rican, and later Mexican immigrants. Puerto Ricans in particular concentrated in the areas along Damen and Milwaukee Avenues through the 1980s after being displaced by the gentrification of Lincoln Park that started in the 1960s.

In the last quarter of the 20th century, a growing artists' community led directly to widespread gentrification, which brought in a large population of young professionals.

=== Kosciuszko Park ===
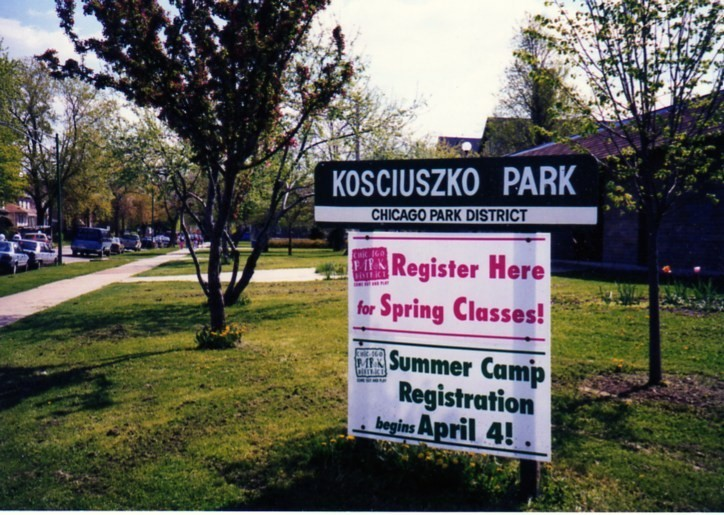
Kosciuszko Park is located by the intersection of Diversey and Pulaski.

Kosciuszko Park is the neighborhood around the park of the same name, named for Tadeusz Kościuszko, a Polish soldier who served as general in the American Revolutionary War. The neighborhood is known by the nicknames "Koz Park" and "The Land of Koz". The boundaries of Kosciuszko Park are Central Park Avenue to the east, the Milwaukee District North Line railroad tracks to west, George Street to the north, and Altgeld Street to the south. Most of this area is in the Logan Square community area, with the portion north of Diversey Avenue lying in Avondale.

Before being annexed to Chicago, the area of the Kosciuszko Park neighborhood was the site of Pennock, Illinois, founded by mining entrepreneur Homer Pennock. Pennock purchased several thousand acres of land in then-rural Jefferson Township in 1881, intending to build an industrial town around a car wheel factory. Pennock paid for the land with money earned through his ownership of a gold mine in Colorado and had building materials sent to the site by way of the Chicago, Milwaukee, St. Paul and Pacific Railroad. He then had workmen begin building a plant with a foundation of 600 by 650 feet. After a tenant for the tire factory failed to materialize, Osgood Manufacturing Company, a refrigerator and furniture maker, moved into the plant, bringing about 500 workers to the area. Homes and shops were built to accommodate the workers. The Chicago Tribune reported in a 1903 article that the homes in Pennock cost $3,000, too expensive for the factory workers moving into the town. Pennock was unable to finance further construction after the plant burnt down and one of his mines flooded. Most of the residents moved back to Chicago, leaving most of the structures in the town abandoned. The City of Chicago annexed Pennock and the rest of Jefferson Township in 1889, and a small number of the homes were renovated. Homer Pennock went on to found Homer, Alaska in 1896.

=== Logan Square ===
In 1836, Martin Nelson Kimbell established a farm in the area bounded by Fullerton, Diversey, Hamlin, and Kimball avenues. In 1843, Justin Butterfield founded a farm in the area bounded by Kedzie, Diversey, and Milwaukee avenues. In 1869, the village of Maplewood was founded on Butterfield's land. Butterfield's daughter Elizabeth, and granddaughter Ada Sawyer Garrett operated a baseball stadium on the land, which they sold to developers in 1925, leading to the building of shops and homes that established the modern neighborhood. A study in 2024 showed that what residents considered to be Logan Square was expanding beyond the borders of the community area map established in the 1920s.

=== Palmer Square ===
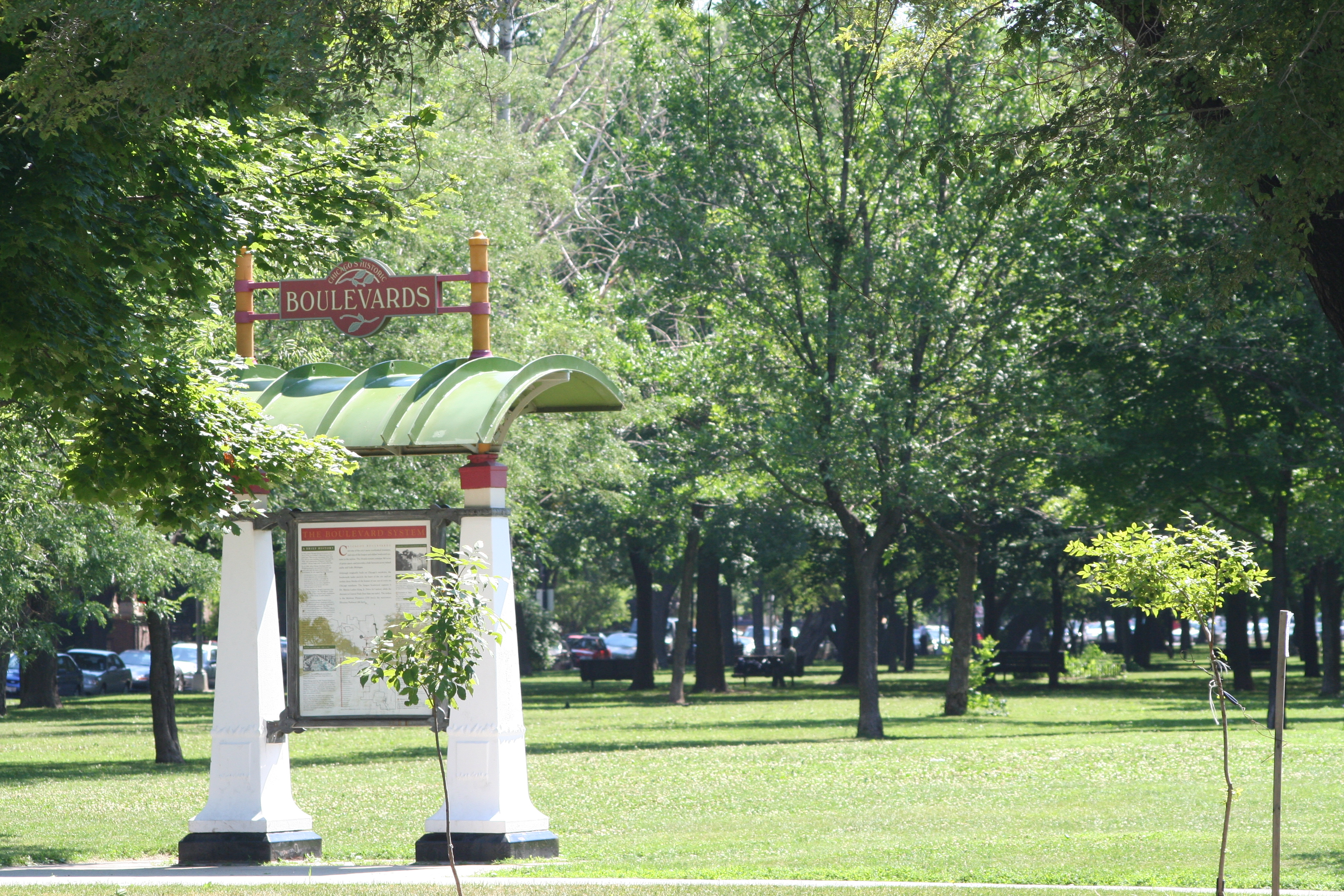
Palmer Square Park

The Palmer Square neighborhood of Chicago is a pocket neighborhood located within the Logan Square community, directly west of Bucktown, north of Humboldt Park, and northwest of Wicker Park. Although there is no clear consensus on this neighborhood's exact boundaries, the City of Chicago Neighborhoods Map shows that it is generally bound by Fullerton Avenue (2400 N) to the north, Armitage Avenue (2000 N) to the south, Kedzie Boulevard (3200 W) to the west, and Milwaukee Avenue to the east.

The neighborhood takes its name from the 7.68-acre (31,100 m^{2}) Palmer Square Park which sits near the western edge of the neighborhood and is the namesake of John McAuley Palmer (1817–1900), a lawyer and Civil War General who served as the 15th Governor of Illinois, a United States Senator, and at age 79, was a candidate for president in 1896. Palmer was an avowed abolitionist, friend and supporter of Abraham Lincoln, and, as the Military Governor of Kentucky in 1865–1866, commanded Federal forces to root out the remnants of slavery in that state. In 2025, Palmer Square Park became the first accredited arboretum in the Chicago Park District.

Ignaz Schwinn (1860–1948), founder of the Schwinn Bicycle Company, lived at the corner of W. Palmer St. and N. Humboldt Blvd. Chicago residents in the early 1900s often used Palmer Square and the rest of the boulevard system as bicycle routes.

== Public libraries ==
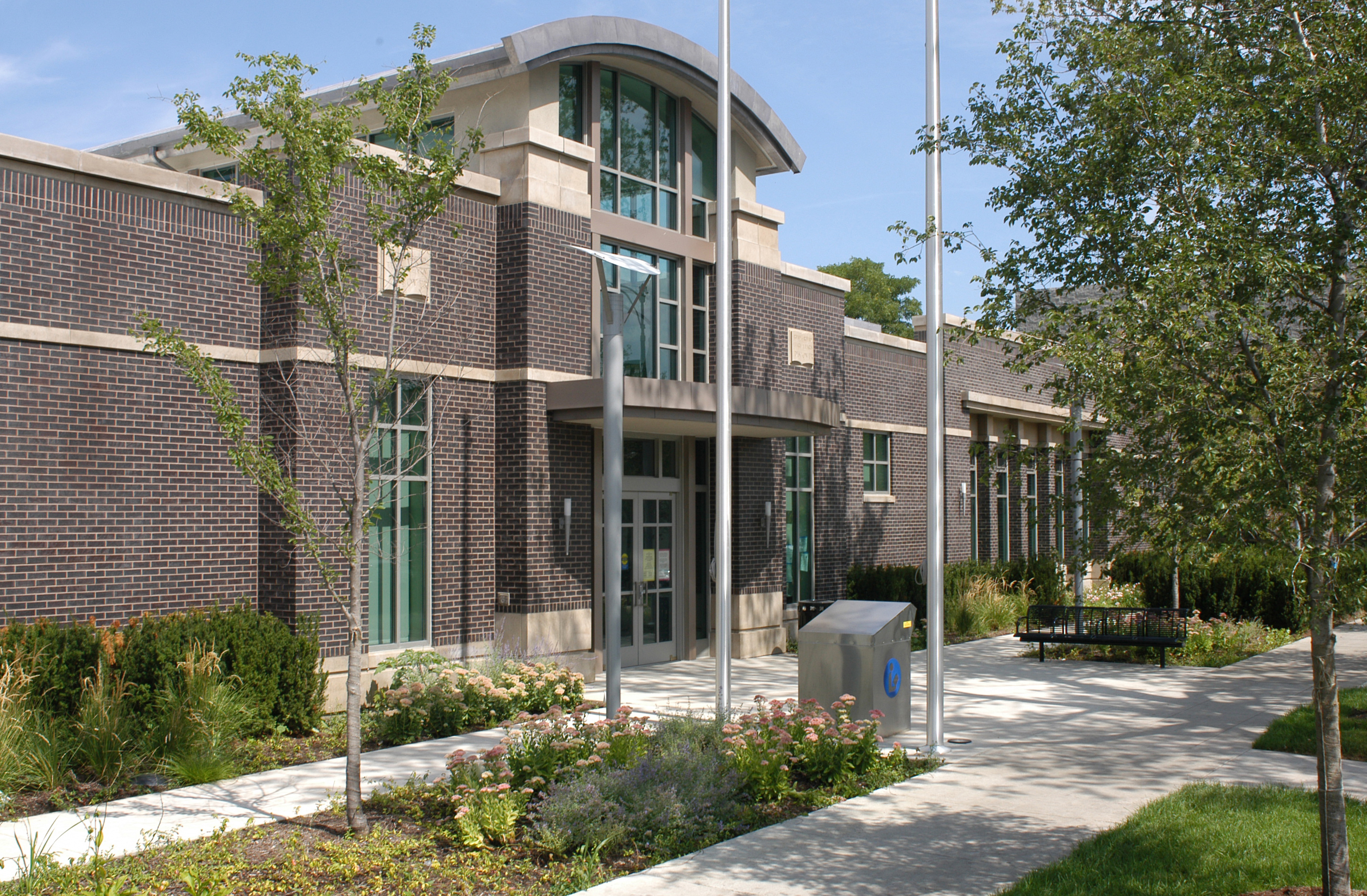
Logan Square branch of the Chicago Public Library

The Chicago Public Library operates one branch located in the Logan Square community area, the Logan Square Branch at 3030 W. Fullerton. The branch in Kosciuszko Park, one of the system's most utilized branches, was closed by the 1950s.

== Cultural organizations ==
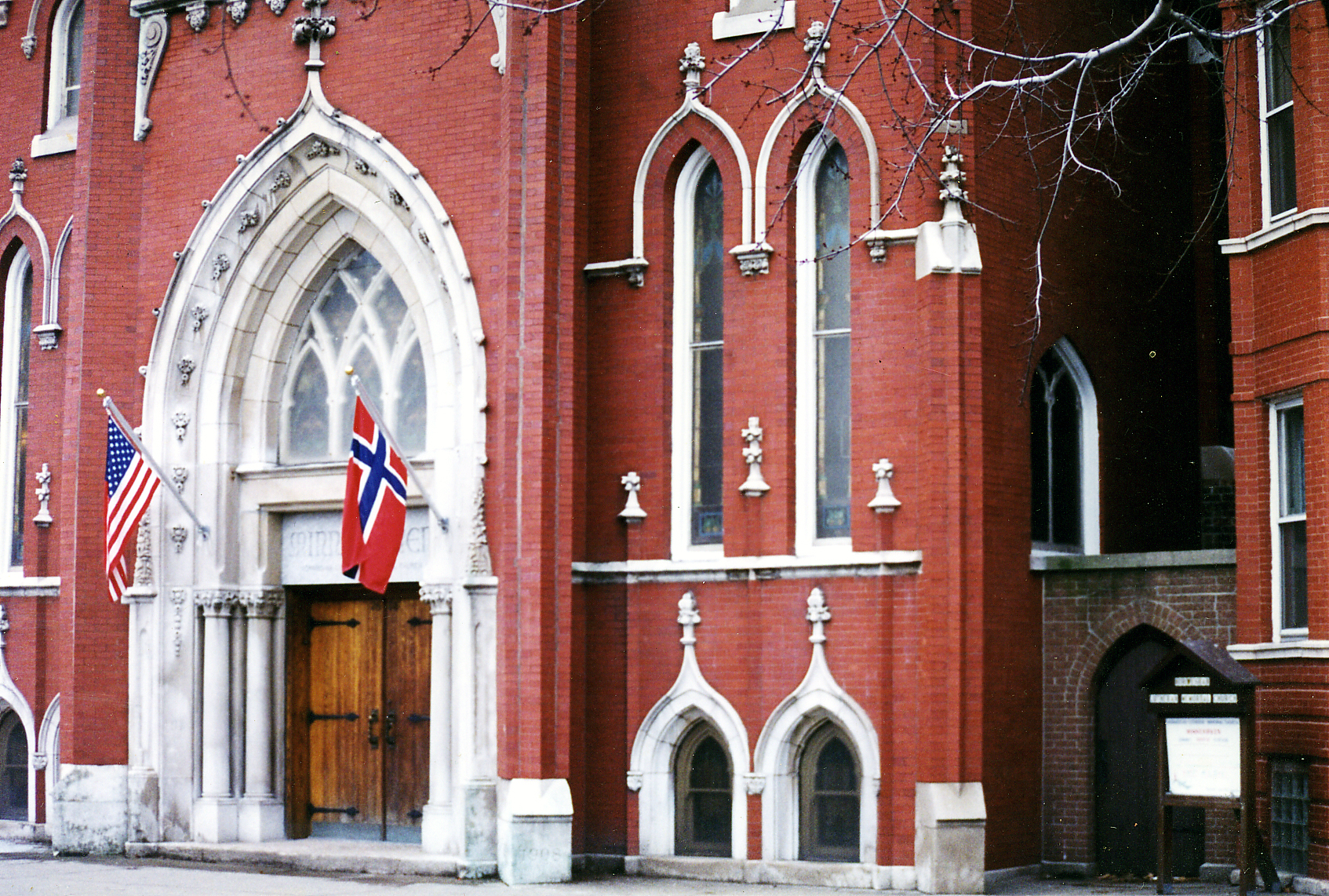
Norwegian Lutheran Memorial Church, 1993

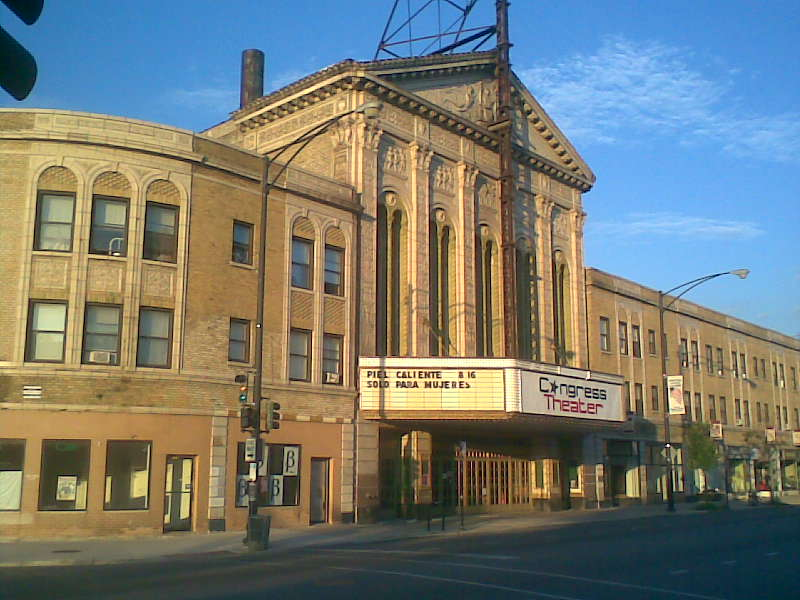
Congress Theater on Milwaukee Ave. (2008)

Logan Square has churches along its boulevards including Minnekirken, a Norwegian Lutheran Memorial Church, and St. Mary of the Angels.

Logan Square has a number of cultural centers, such as The Comfort Station, an art gallery and event space, and AnySquared Projects, a nonprofit art collective; and St. Hedwig's Church. The Lincoln Lodge on Milwaukee Avenue presents live comedy. Next door is the office of In These Times, an independent magazine founded in 1976 which focuses on social justice.

The historic Congress Theater has been a major landmark in Logan Square since it was built in 1926. The theater fell into disrepair and was closed in 2013. In its 100th year, after over a decade of ownership changes and starts and stops to redevelopment plans, in February 2026 it was announced that all necessary financing and approvals for a complete renovation of the complex were in place. Construction was slated to begin almost immediately and completion targeted for December, 2027.

== Government and infrastructure ==
The Roberto Clemente Post Office is located in Logan Square.

Logan Square is served by three stops on the Chicago Transit Authority (CTA)'s Blue Line: Western, California, and Logan Square. All three stations provide 24/7 service to O'Hare International Airport, downtown, and Forest Park.

== Education ==
Residents are zoned to Chicago Public Schools.

== Politics ==
In the 2016 presidential election, Logan Square cast 27,987 votes for Hillary Clinton and cast 2,435 votes for Donald Trump (86.99% to 7.57%). In the 2012 presidential election, Logan Square cast 22,608 votes for Barack Obama and cast 3,362 votes for Mitt Romney (83.88% to 12.47%).

== Notable people ==
- Jessica Camacho (born 1982), actress (The Flash, Taken, and Watchmen), was a childhood resident of Logan Square
- Morris Childs (1902–1991), double agent for the F.B.I. against the Soviet Union, was a childhood resident of 3264 West Fullerton Avenue
- Eve Ewing (born 1986), sociologist, author, poet, and visual artist, was a childhood resident of Logan Square
- John Guzlowski (born 1948), Polish-American author and poet was a childhood resident of Logan Square
- Lori Lightfoot (born 1962), 56th Mayor of Chicago (2019–2023), resides in Logan Square with her wife and daughter
- Adam Lizakowski (born 1956), a Polish poet, translator, and photographer, former resident, he founded the Unpaid Rent group, a collective of Polish language poets who were based out of his former home in Logan Square
- Richard Nickel (1928–1972), photographer and preservationist, was a childhood resident of Logan Square
- Knute Rockne (1888–1931), football coach, was a childhood resident of Logan Square He grew up in the Logan Square area of Chicago, on the northwest side of the city.
- William A. Redmond (1908–1992), 64th Speaker of the Illinois House of Representatives (1975–1981), was a childhood resident of Logan Square
- Mike Royko (1932–1997), author and Pulitzer Prize winning newspaper columnist, was a childhood resident of Logan Square living at 2122 North Milwaukee Avenue
- Ignaz Schwinn (1860–1948), a designer, a founder, and the eventual sole owner of the Schwinn Bicycle Company
- Shel Silverstein (1930–1999), author and poet, was a childhood resident of Logan Square

== See also ==
- Chicago Norske Klub
- The Fireside Bowl
- Norwegian Americans
- Polish Americans
- Polish Cathedral style
