= Chicago Norske Klub =

Norwegian-American social club in Chicago, Illinois

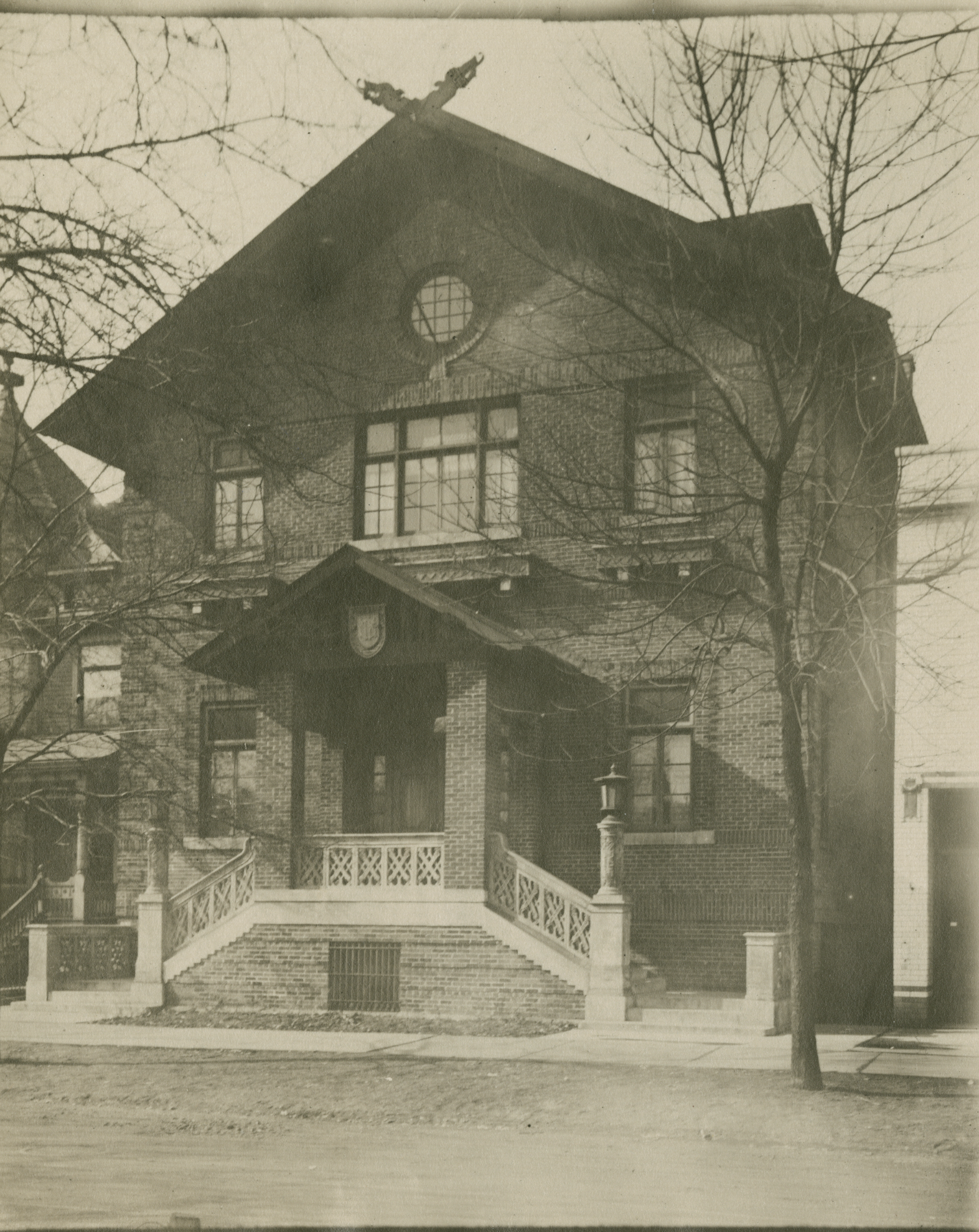
The club's clubhouse at 2350 North Kedzie Boulevard in the early 20th century

Chicago Norske Klub was a Norwegian-American social club in Chicago, Illinois, active from 1911 to 1971. Its clubhouse at 2350 North Kedzie Avenue was in the Logan Square neighborhood, where it served as a cultural center for Chicago's Norwegian-American community.

== History ==
The club was formed on June 28, 1911, through the merger of the Norwegian Quartet Club, founded in 1890, and the Norwegian Club in Chicago, founded in 1905. Its membership included Norwegian-American businessmen and professionals, and its activities emphasized sociability and fellowship.

Until its clubhouse opened, the club met in the second-floor "Old Hall" at the northwest corner of Milwaukee Avenue and Kedzie Avenue. The clubhouse at 2350 North Kedzie opened on July 4, 1917. It also hosted meetings and luncheons for other organizations, including the Logan Square Lions Club.

In 1971, the club filed for bankruptcy after a personal-injury lawsuit and disbanded. The building was purchased by the Bjørnstjerne Bjørnson Lodge of the Sons of Norway, which used it for seventeen years; it was later converted to condominiums.

== Programs and guests ==
The club sponsored lectures, a choir and orchestra, a dramatic society, and annual art exhibitions. The Dramatic Society was founded in 1919, and the first art exhibition was held in 1920. Emil Biørn led the club orchestra and contributed to its interior decoration.

Guests included Jane Addams, Fridtjof Nansen, Roald Amundsen, Queen Marie of Romania, Johan Bojer, Ole Rolvaag, Carl J. Hambro, and Crown Prince Olav and Crown Princess Märtha of Norway.
