= Norwegian Americans =

Americans of Norwegian birth or descent

Norskamerikanere/Norskamerikanarar (Bokmål) Norskamerikanarar (Nynorsk)
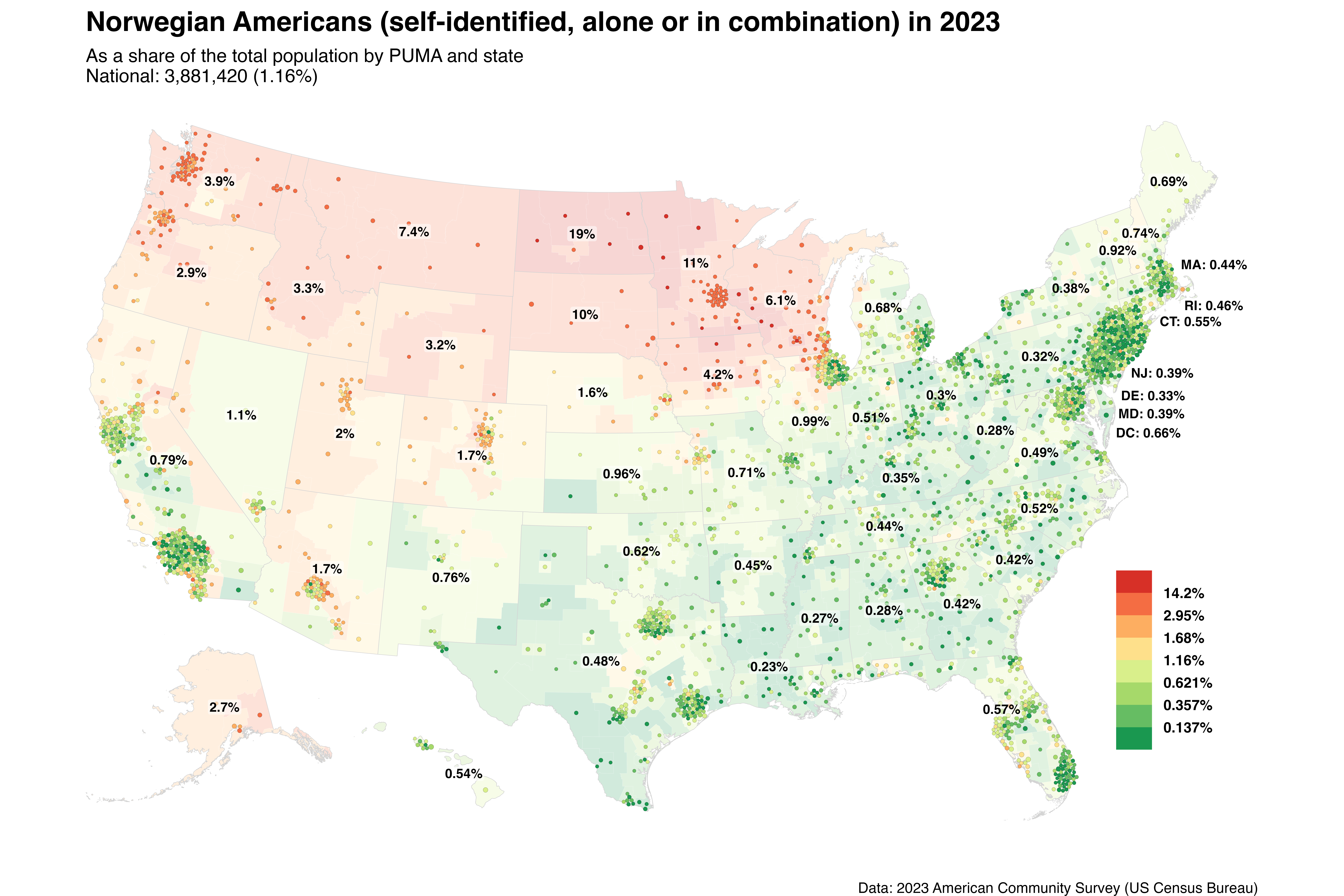

Total population
- 3,883,173 (1.1%) alone or in combination 1,230,354 (0.4%) Norwegian alone 2021 estimates, self-reported

Regions with significant populations
- Midwest: 2,273,683
- West: 1,552,462
- South: 545,699
- Northeast: 266,881
- Minnesota: 868,361
- Wisconsin: 466,469
- California: 412,177
- Washington: 410,818
- North Dakota: 199,154
- Iowa: 173,640
- Illinois: 171,745
- Oregon: 164,676
- Texas: 129,081
- Arizona: 124,618
- Colorado: 119,164
- Florida: 117,444
- South Dakota: 113,543
- New York: 92,796
- Montana: 90,425

Languages
- English, Norwegian (American Norwegian)

Religion
- Christianity (predominantly Evangelical Lutheran Church in America, Evangelical Lutheran Synod)

Related ethnic groups
- Other Norwegians • other Nordic and Scandinavian Americans

Norwegian Americans (Norwegian: Norskamerikanere/Norskamerikanarar) are Americans with ancestral roots in Norway. Norwegian immigrants went to the United States primarily in the latter half of the 19th century and the first few decades of the 20th century. There are more than 4.5 million Norwegian Americans, according to the 2021 U.S. census; (Note: Incidentally, the number of Americans of Norwegian descent living in the U.S. (4.5 million) was roughly equal to the population of Norway (4.6 million) in 2005. In April 2012 Norway's population surpassed 5 million (ssb.no), of which 1.1 million were either born outside Norway, or born in Norway with both or one parent born outside Norway.) most live in the Upper Midwest and on the West Coast of the United States.

== Immigration ==
=== Viking-era exploration ===
Norsemen from Greenland and Iceland were the first Europeans to reach North America. Leif Erikson reached North America via Norse settlements in Greenland around the year 1000. Norse settlers from Greenland founded the settlement of L'Anse aux Meadows in Vinland, in what is now Newfoundland, Canada. These settlers failed to establish a permanent settlement because of conflicts with indigenous people and within the Norse community.

=== Colonial settlement ===
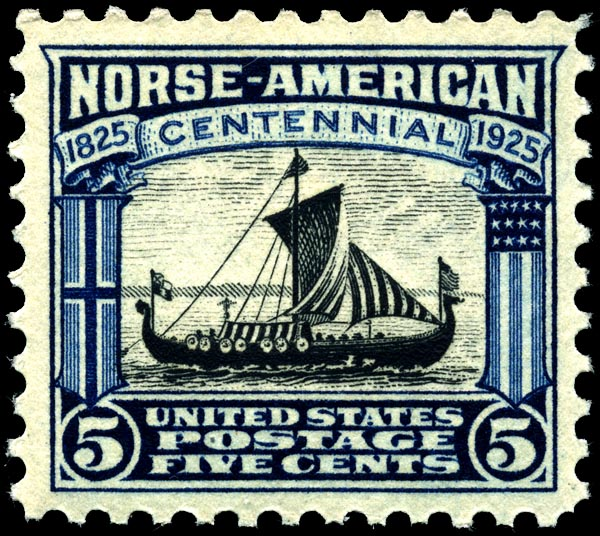
A 1925 U.S. postage stamp featuring the ship Viking honoring the 100th anniversary of Norwegian immigration.

The Netherlands, and especially the cities of Amsterdam and Hoorn, had strong commercial ties with the coastal lumber trade of Norway during the 17th century and many Norwegians immigrated to Amsterdam. Some of them settled in Dutch colonies, although never in large numbers. (Note: For further reading, see for example J.H. Innes, New Amsterdam and its people.) There were also Norwegian settlers in Pennsylvania in the first half of the 18th century, upstate New York in the latter half of the same century, and in New England during both halves.

During the colonial period, Norwegian immigrants often joined the Dutch seeking opportunities for trade and a new life in America. The Dutch often took Norwegians with them to the New World for their sailing expertise. There was a Norwegian presence in New Amsterdam in the early part of the 17th century. Hans Hansen Bergen, a native of Bergen, Norway, was one of the earliest settlers of the Dutch colony of New Amsterdam, having immigrated in 1633. Another early Norwegian settler, Albert Andriessen Bradt, arrived in New Amsterdam in 1637.

Approximately 60 people had settled in the Manhattan area before the region was taken over by the British Empire in 1664. The total number of Norwegians that settled in New Netherland is not known. In the period that followed, many of the original Norwegian settlers in the area remained, including the family of Pieter Van Brugh, a colonial mayor of Albany, who was the grandson of early Norwegian immigrants.

=== 19th century ===
Many immigrants during the early 1800s sought religious freedom. From the mid-1800s however, the driving forces behind Norwegian immigration to the United States were agricultural disasters which led to poverty, from the European Potato Failure of the 1840s to the Famine of 1866–68. The agricultural revolution also put farmers out of work and pushed them to seek employment in a more industrialized America.

==== Religious migration ====
The earliest immigrants from Norway to America emigrated mostly for religious motives, especially as members of the Religious Society of Friends or as Haugeans. To a great extent, this early emigration from Norway was born out of religious persecution, especially for Quakers and a local religious group, the Haugeans.

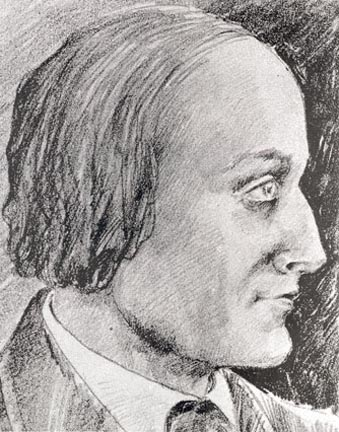
Cleng Peerson

Organized Norwegian immigration to North America began in 1825, when several dozen Norwegians left Stavanger bound for North America on the sloop Restauration (often called the "Norse Mayflower"). Under the leadership of Cleng Peerson, the Restauration left Stavanger in July 1825 and ferried six families on a 14-week journey. The ship landed in New York City, where it was at first impounded for exceeding its passenger limit. After intervention from President John Quincy Adams, the passengers moved on to settle in Kendall, New York with the help of Andreas Stangeland, witnessing the opening of the Erie Canal en route. After making the journey to Kendall, Cleng Peerson became a traveling emissary for Norwegian immigrants and died in a Norwegian Settlement near Cranfills Gap, Texas, in 1865. The descendants of these immigrants are referred to as "Sloopers", in reference to the sloop ship that brought them from Norway. Many of the 1825 immigrants moved on from the Kendall Settlement in the mid-1830s, settling in Illinois and Wisconsin. These "Sloopers" gave impetus to the westward movement of Norwegians by founding a settlement in the Fox River area of Illinois. A small urban colony of Norwegians arrived in Chicago at about the same time.

==== Organized immigration ====
While about 65 Norwegians emigrated via Sweden and elsewhere in the intervening years, no emigrant ships left Norway for the New World until the 1836 departures of the Den Norske Klippe and Norden. In 1837, a group of immigrants from Tinn emigrated via Gothenburg to the Fox River Settlement, near present-day Sheridan, Illinois. It was the writings of Ole Rynning, who traveled to the U.S. on the Ægir in 1837 that energized Norwegian immigration, however.

Throughout much of the latter part of the 19th century and into the 20th century, a vast majority of Norwegian emigration to both the United States and Canada followed a route commonly shared by most Swedish, Danish and Finnish emigrants of the period, being via England by means of the monopoly established by the leading shipping lines of Great Britain, primarily the White Star Line and the Cunard Line, both of which operated chiefly out of Liverpool, England. These lines negotiated with smaller 'feeder lines', primarily the Wilson Line, which was based out of the port city of Hull on England's east coast, to provide emigrants with passage from port cities such as Christiania (present-day Oslo), Bergen and Trondheim to England via Hull. Steamship companies such as Cunard and White Star included fares for passage on these feeder ship in their overall ticket prices, along with railroad fares for passage between Hull and Liverpool and temporary accommodations in numerous hotels owned by the shipping lines in port cities such as Liverpool.

Most Norwegian emigrants bound for the United States entered the country through New York City, with smaller numbers coming through other eastern ports such as Boston and Philadelphia. Other shipping lines such as the Canadian Pacific Line, which operated chiefly out of Liverpool, and the Glasgow-based Anchor Line operated routes to ports in eastern Canada, primarily Quebec City, Montreal and Halifax. Because Canadian-bound routes were slightly shorter, lines which disembarked at Canadian ports often provided quicker passages and cheaper fares. The Canadian route offered many advantages to the emigrant over traveling to the U.S. directly. "They moved on from Quebec both by rail and by steamer for another thousand or more miles (1,600 km) for a steerage fare of slightly less than $9.00." Steamers from Quebec, Canada brought them to Toronto, Canada; then, the immigrants often traveled by rail for 93 miles (150 km) to Collingwood, Ontario, Canada on Lake Huron, from where steamers transported them across Lake Michigan to Chicago, Milwaukee and Green Bay. Not until the start of the 20th century did Norwegians accept Canada as a land of the second chance. This was also true of the many American-Norwegians who moved to Canada seeking homesteads and new economic opportunities. By 1921, one-third of all Norwegians in Canada had been born in the U.S.

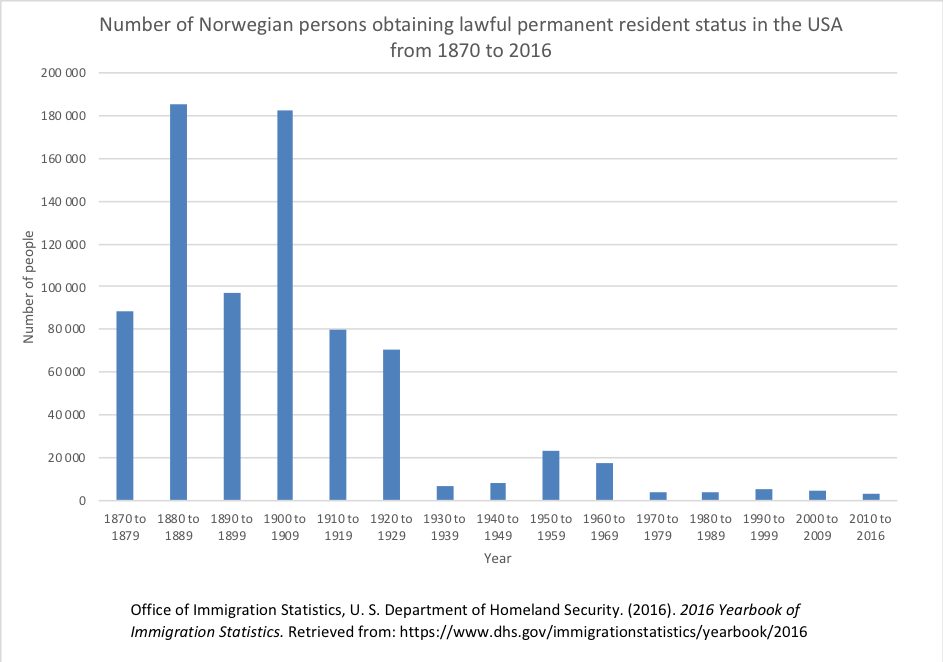
Data from the U.S. Office of Immigration statistics showing trends in Norwegian immigration to the U.S. from 1870 to 2016

Between 1825 and 1925, more than 800,000 Norwegians immigrated to North America—about one-third of Norway's population with the majority immigrating to the U.S., and lesser numbers immigrating to the Dominion of Canada. With the exception of Ireland, no single country contributed a larger percentage of its population to the United States than Norway. Data from the U.S. Office of Immigration statistics of the number of Norwegians obtaining lawful permanent resident status in the U.S. from 1870 to 2016 highlights two peaks in the migration flow, the first one in the 1880s, and the second one in the first decade of the 20th century. It also shows an abrupt decrease after 1929, during the economic crisis of the 1930s.

==== Settlement ====
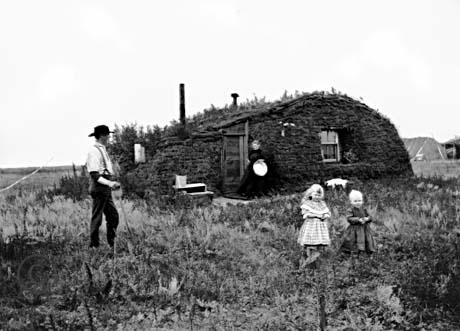
Norwegian settlers in front of their sod house in North Dakota in 1898. Photo taken by John McCarthy and collected by Fred Hultstrand

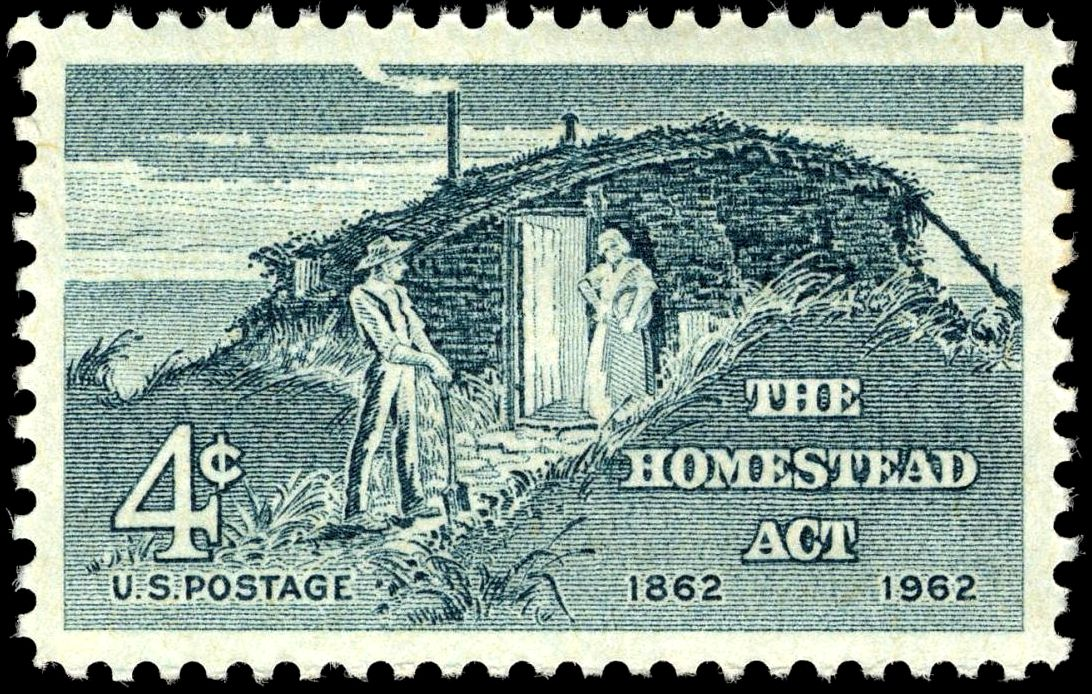
A 1962 U.S. postage stamp commemorating the centennial of the Homestead Act was issued. The image on the stamp is based on Norwegian settlers in front of their sod house.

Beginning in 1836, Norwegian immigrants arrived in significant numbers annually. From the early "slooper" settlement in Illinois, Norwegian pioneers followed the general spread of population northwestward into Wisconsin. Wisconsin remained the center of Norwegian American activity up until the American Civil War, a war in which a number of Norwegian Americans fought for the Union, such as in the 15th Wisconsin Volunteer Regiment. In the 1850s Norwegian land seekers began moving into both Iowa and Minnesota, and serious migration to the Dakotas was underway by the 1870s.

Norwegian immigration through the years was predominantly motivated by economic concerns. Compounded by crop failures, Norwegian agricultural resources were unable to keep up with population growth, and the Homestead Act of 1862 promised fertile, flat land. As a result, settlement trended westward with each passing year. The majority of Norwegian agrarian settlements developed in the northern region of the so-called Homestead Act Triangle between the Mississippi and the Missouri rivers. Early Norwegian settlements were in Pennsylvania, Massachusetts, and Illinois, but moved westward into Wisconsin, Minnesota, and the Dakotas. Later waves of Norwegian immigration went to the Western states such as Montana, Washington, Oregon, and Utah through missionary efforts which gained Norwegian and Swedish converts to Mormonism. Additionally, craftsmen also immigrated to a larger, more diverse market. Until recently, there was a Norwegian area in Sunset Park, Brooklyn originally populated by Norwegian craftsmen.

The Upper Midwest became home to most immigrants. In 1910 almost 80 percent of the one million or more Norwegian Americans lived in that part of the United States. In 1990, 51.7 percent of the Norwegian American population lived in the Midwest. At that time, Minnesota had the largest Norwegian American population and Minneapolis functioned as a hub for Norwegian American secular and religious activities. Chicago was an attractive destination.

In the Pacific Northwest, the Puget Sound region, and especially the city of Seattle, became another center of immigrant life. Enclaves of Norwegian immigrants emerged as well in greater Brooklyn, New York, in Alaska, and Texas. After Minnesota, Wisconsin had the most Norwegians in 1990, followed by California, Washington, and North Dakota.

== Cultural identity ==
=== 19th century ===
In a letter from Chicago dated November 9, 1855, Elling Haaland from Stavanger, Norway, assured his relatives back home that "of all nations Norwegians are those who are most favored by Americans." Svein Nilsson, a Norwegian-American journalist recorded that "A newcomer from Norway who arrives here will be surprised indeed to find in the heart of the country, more than a thousand miles from his landing place, a town where language and way of life so unmistakably remind him of his native land."

This sentiment was expressed frequently as the immigrants attempted to seek acceptance and negotiate entrance into the new society. In their segregated farming communities, Norwegians were spared direct prejudice and might indeed have been viewed as a welcome ingredient in a region's development. Still, a sense of inferiority was inherent in their position. The immigrants were occasionally referred to as "guests" in the United States and they were not immune to condescending and disparaging attitudes by old-stock Americans. Economic adaptation required a certain amount of interaction with a larger commercial environment, from working for an American farmer to doing business with the seed dealer, the banker, and the elevator operator. Products had to be grown and sold—all of which pulled Norwegian farmers into social contact with their American neighbors. In Pennsylvania a group of Norwegians flew a flag described as: "The Cross of Norway in the centre, surrounded by the Stars and Stripes of the United States."

Norwegian-American debating societies provided opportunities for immigrants to discuss and debate issues of the day in an atmosphere conducive to learning while also developing skills useful in American life. Beginning in 1889, both the Wig Debate Society and Forward Debate Society, located in Minnesota, hosted weekly debates. Many topics were discussed including voting rights, women's rights, and racism. These societies helped to develop friendship and understanding.

In places like Brooklyn, Chicago, Minneapolis, and Seattle, Norwegian-Americans interacted with the multi-cultural environment of the city while constructing a complex ethnic community that met the needs of its members. It might be said that a Scandinavian melting pot existed in the urban setting among Norwegians, Swedes, and Danes, evidenced in residential and occupational patterns, in political mobilization, and in public commemoration. Inter-marriage promoted inter-ethnic assimilation. There are no longer any significant Norwegian immigrant enclaves or neighborhoods in America's largest cities. Beginning in the 1920s, Norwegian-Americans increasingly became suburban.

=== 20th century ===
Norwegian Americans cultivated bonds with Norway, sending gifts home often and offering aid during natural disasters and other hardships in Norway. Relief in the form of collected funds was forthcoming without delay. Only during conflicts within the Union between Sweden and Norway, however, did Norwegian Americans become involved directly in the political life of Norway. In the 1880s they formed societies to assist Norwegian liberals, collecting money to assist rifle clubs in Norway should the political conflict between liberals and conservatives call for arms. The ongoing tensions between Sweden and Norway and Norway's humiliating retreat in 1895 fueled nationalism and created anguish. Norwegian Americans raised money to strengthen Norway's military defenses. The unilateral declaration by Norway on June 7, 1905, to dissolve its union with Sweden yielded a new holiday of patriotic celebration.

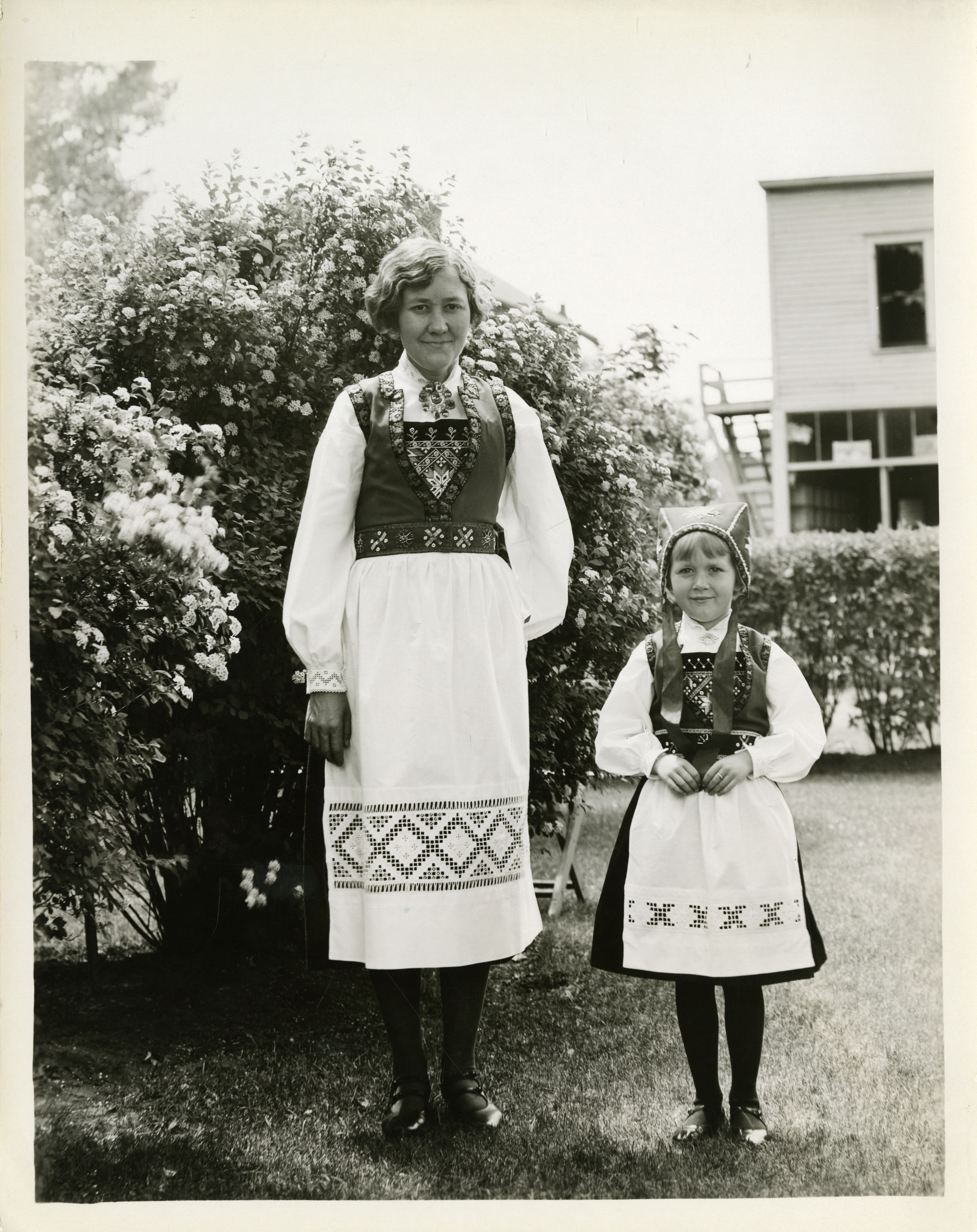
Mother and daughter in traditional Norwegian bunad during the Norse-American Centennial celebration.

In 1925, the Norse-American Centennial was held at the Minnesota State Fair, celebrating 100 years of organized Norwegian migration to the United States. The Centennial program included musical performances, a pageant, exhibitions, athletic events, and speeches from Norwegian American leaders as well as President Calvin Coolidge.

In American popular culture, Norwegian Americans were the central characters in the popular CBS network television series, Mama (1949–1956). Set in San Francisco around 1900, the weekly program focused on working-class family life. They also form the background to Garrison Keillor's "Lake Wobegon" series of novels as well as A Prairie Home Companion, a radio variety show that contains much humorous material from the "Norwegian American Midwest".

According to a 2018 paper, Norwegian immigrants who lived in large ethnic enclaves in the United States in the 1910 and 1920 "had lower occupational earnings, were more likely to be in farming occupations, and were less likely to be in white-collar occupations."

== Traditions ==
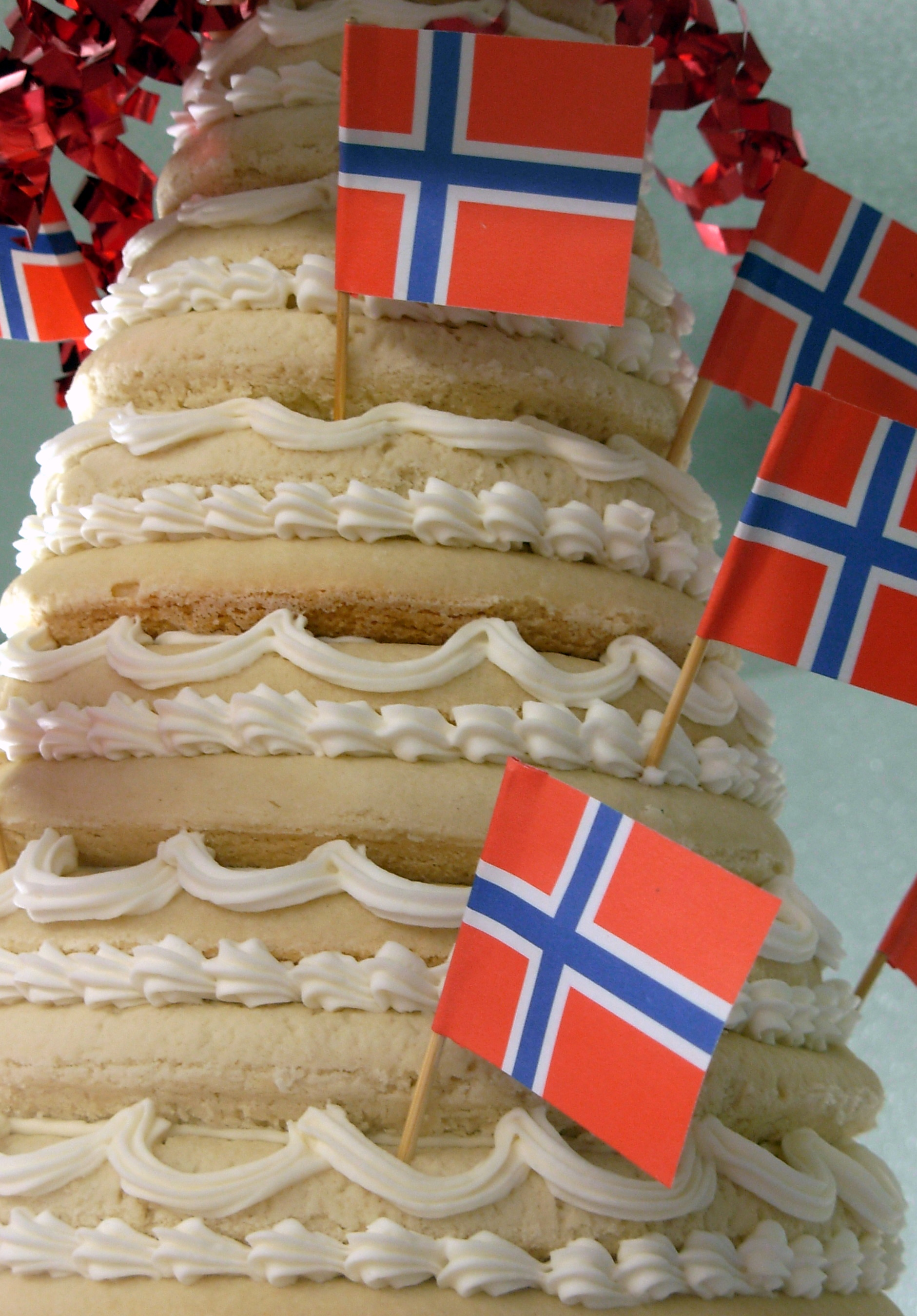
Kransekake cake decorated with small flags of Norway at the Olmsted County Fair in Rochester, Minnesota.

Today, the traditions practiced by Norwegian Americans are distinct from those practiced in modern-day Norway. Norwegian Americans are primarily descendants of 19th or early 20th century working class and rural Norwegians, and the traditions which these immigrants brought with them represented a specific segment of the Norwegian population and cultural period. As these traditions continued to evolve in an American context, they are today divergent from that of modern-day Norway.

Norwegian Americans actively celebrate and maintain their heritage in many ways. Much of these traditions center upon Lutheran-Evangelical church communities. Other organizations, such as the Sons and Daughters of Norway and the Chicago Norske Klub also serve to preserve their ethnic heritage. Culinary customs (e.g., lutefisk and lefse), national dress (bunad), and Norwegian holidays (Syttende Mai) are also popular. Some regional festivals celebrate Norwegian heritage, predominantly in areas with a high density of Norwegian Americans, such as Norsk Høstfest (English: Norwegian Autumn Festival), an annual festival held in Minot, North Dakota.

A number of towns in the United States, particularly in the Upper Midwest, are known for their display of Norwegian heritage, including: Stoughton, Wisconsin; Sunburg, Minnesota; Ulen, Minnesota; and Westby, Wisconsin. Starbuck, Minnesota, is known to produce the largest lefse in the world. Other regions known for their Norwegian heritage or origins include: Norge, Virginia; Petersburg, Alaska; Poulsbo, Washington; and Lapskaus Boulevard, the nickname of 8th Avenue in Brooklyn.

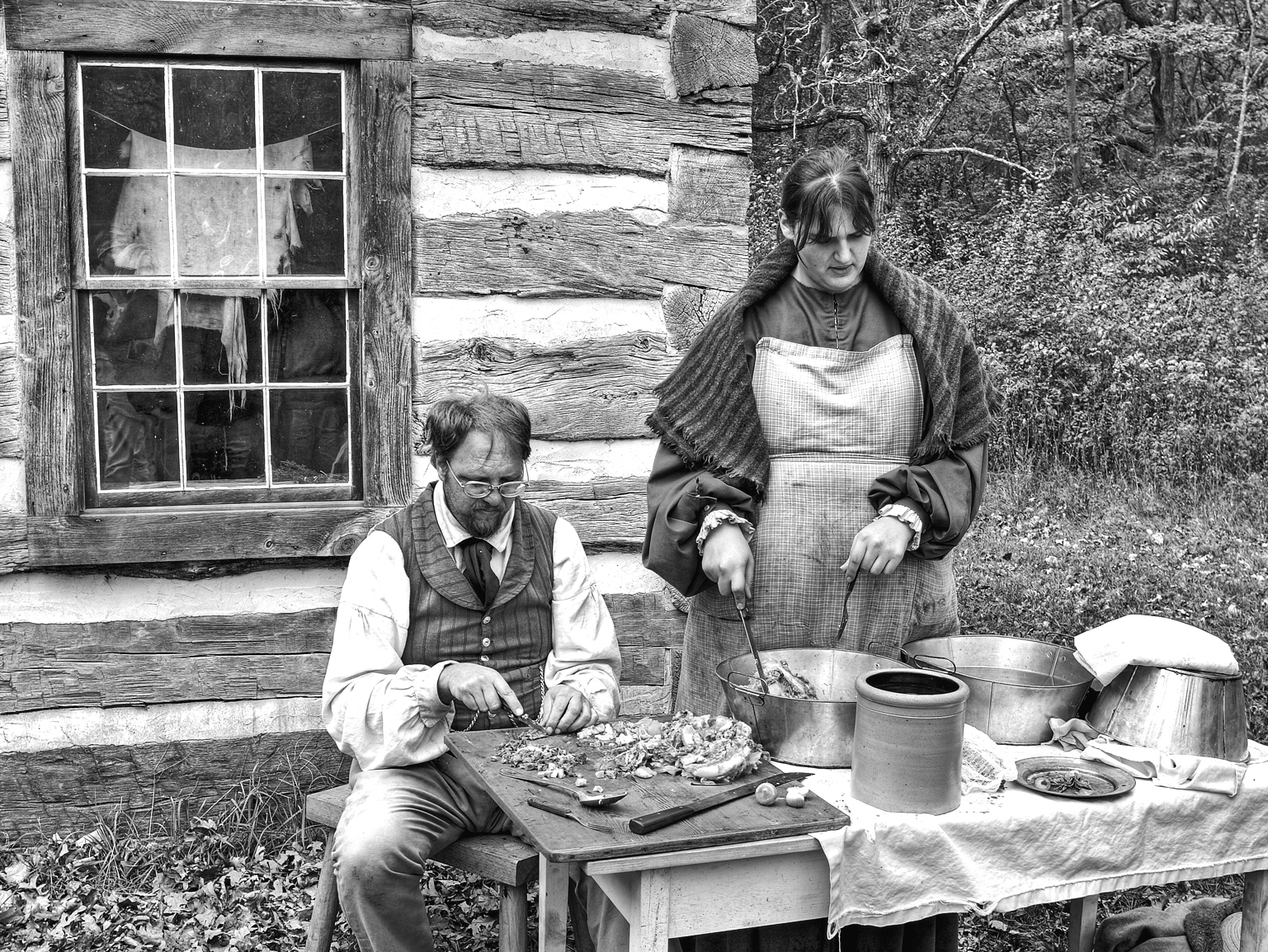
A re-enactment of Norwegian farmers making head cheese in Wisconsin.

There are a number of museums commemorating the Norwegian-American immigrant experience. Norskedalen is a natural and cultural heritage site near Coon Valley, Wisconsin, spread over 440 acres which exhibits the Norwegian immigrant experience of the late 1800s. Little Norway, Wisconsin, is a living museum of a Norwegian village located in Blue Mounds, Wisconsin. The National Nordic Museum in the Ballard, a district in Seattle heavily settled by Scandinavian immigrants, serves as a community gathering place. The Vesterheim Norwegian-American Museum in Decorah, Iowa, is the largest museum in the United States dedicated to the experiences of a single immigrant population and has an extensive collection of Norwegian-American artifacts. Chapel in the Hills, located in Rapid City, South Dakota, is an exact replica of the Borgund Stave Church of Lærdal Municipality, Norway. The church's site also maintains other period typical historical buildings.

== Religion ==
The Norwegian Lutheran Memorial Church of Minneapolis. It is one of two American churches still using Norwegian as a primary liturgical language, the other being Minnekirken in Chicago, Illinois.

Although today Norway is relatively secular, Norwegian-Americans are among the most religious ethnic groups in the United States, with 90% acknowledging a religious affiliation in 1998. Because membership in the Church of Norway (the state church) was mandatory until the 19th century in Norway, all ethnic Norwegians have traditionally been Lutheran. Today, many Norwegian Americans remain Lutheran, though significant numbers converted to other Christian denominations. Some Norwegians immigrated to the United States in hope of practicing other religions freely. A significant number of Norwegian immigrants and their descendants were Methodists concentrated especially in Chicago, with its own theological seminary, while others converted to become Baptists. There were also groups of Quakers, relating back to "the Sloopers," and Mormons who joined the trek to the "New Jerusalem" in Salt Lake City, Utah.

=== Norwegian Lutheranism ===
Most Norwegian immigrants to the United States, particularly in the migration wave between the 1860s and early 20th century, were members of the Church of Norway, an evangelical Lutheran church established by the Constitution of Norway. As they settled in their new homeland and forged their own communities, however, Norwegian-American Lutherans diverged from the state church in many ways, forming synods and conferences that ultimately contributed to the present Lutheran establishment in the United States. The Norwegian Lutheran church was a focal point in rural settlements in the Upper Midwest. The congregation became an all-encompassing institution for its members, creating a tight social network that touched all aspects of immigrant life. The force of tradition in religious practice made the church a central institution in the urban environment as well. The severe reality of urban life increased the social role of the church.

The official state church in Norway did not extend pastoral care to emigrants and provided no guidance in the formation of new congregations in the United States. The Church of Norway was seen as an integrated part of the Norwegian state administration with no particular responsibility for people outside of Norway, with the exception of sailors and those who remained citizens. As a consequence, no fewer than 14 Lutheran synods were founded by Norwegian immigrants between 1846 and 1900. In 1917 most of the factions reconciled doctrinal differences and organized the Norwegian Lutheran Church in America. It was one of the church bodies that in 1960 formed the American Lutheran Church, which in 1988 became a constituent part of the newly created Evangelical Lutheran Church in America (ELCA).

=== Norwegian Lutheran colleges ===
Several Lutheran colleges and higher education institutions were founded by Norwegian Americans, which retain a Norwegian lutheran identity today. Luther College, located in Decorah, Iowa, was founded by Norwegian immigrants in 1861 and is today associated with the ELCA. Concordia College in Moorhead, Minnesota, is also associated with the ELCA and was founded by Norwegian settlers in 1891. Other Norwegian Lutheran colleges include Augsburg University, Augustana College, Bethany Lutheran College, Pacific Lutheran University, St. Olaf College, and Waldorf College.

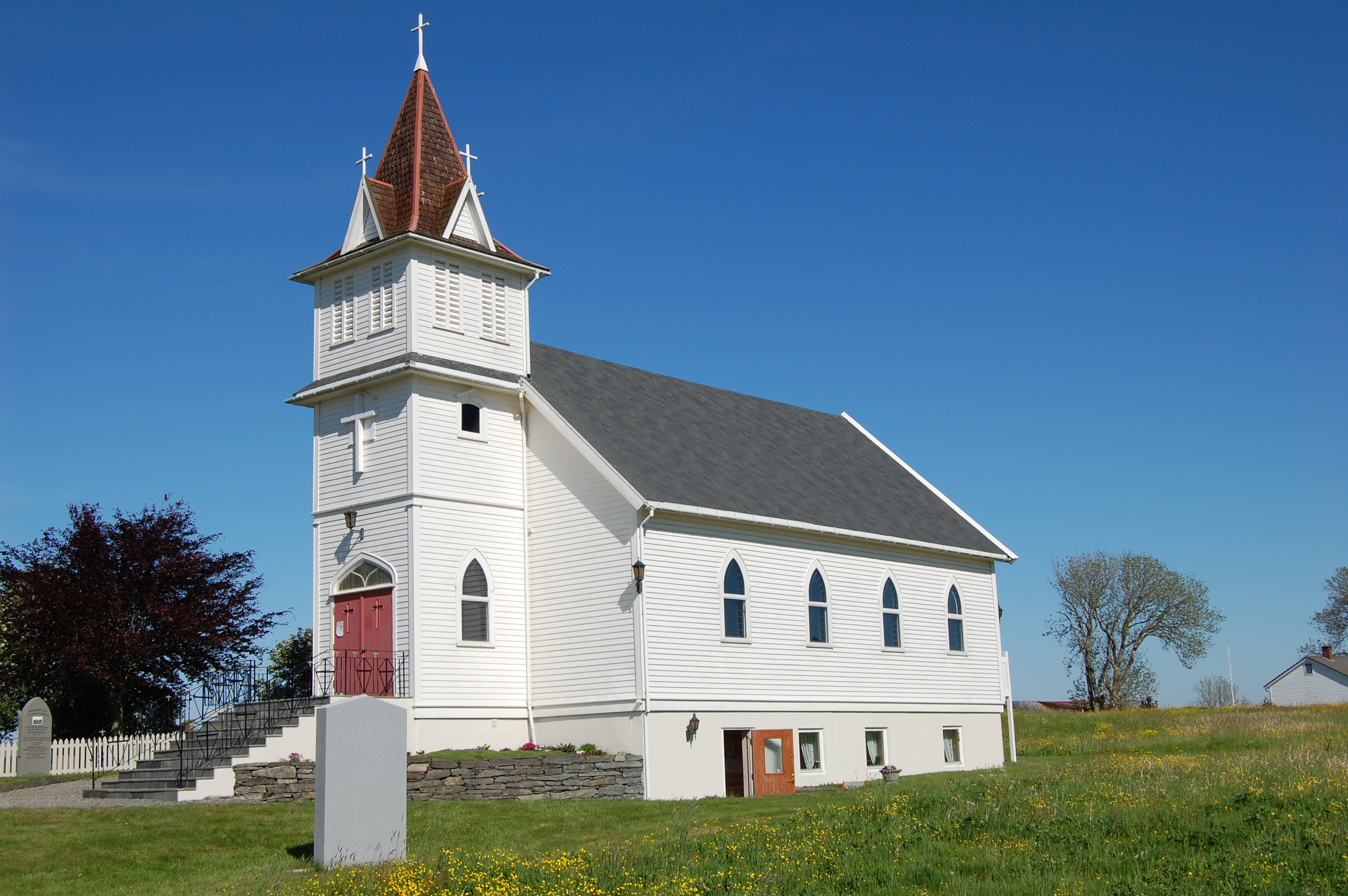
Emigrant Church in the village of Sletta on the island of Radøy in Norway. The church was built from 1908 to 1922 in Brampton, North Dakota, and moved as a gift from Norwegian emigrants in the United States in 1997.

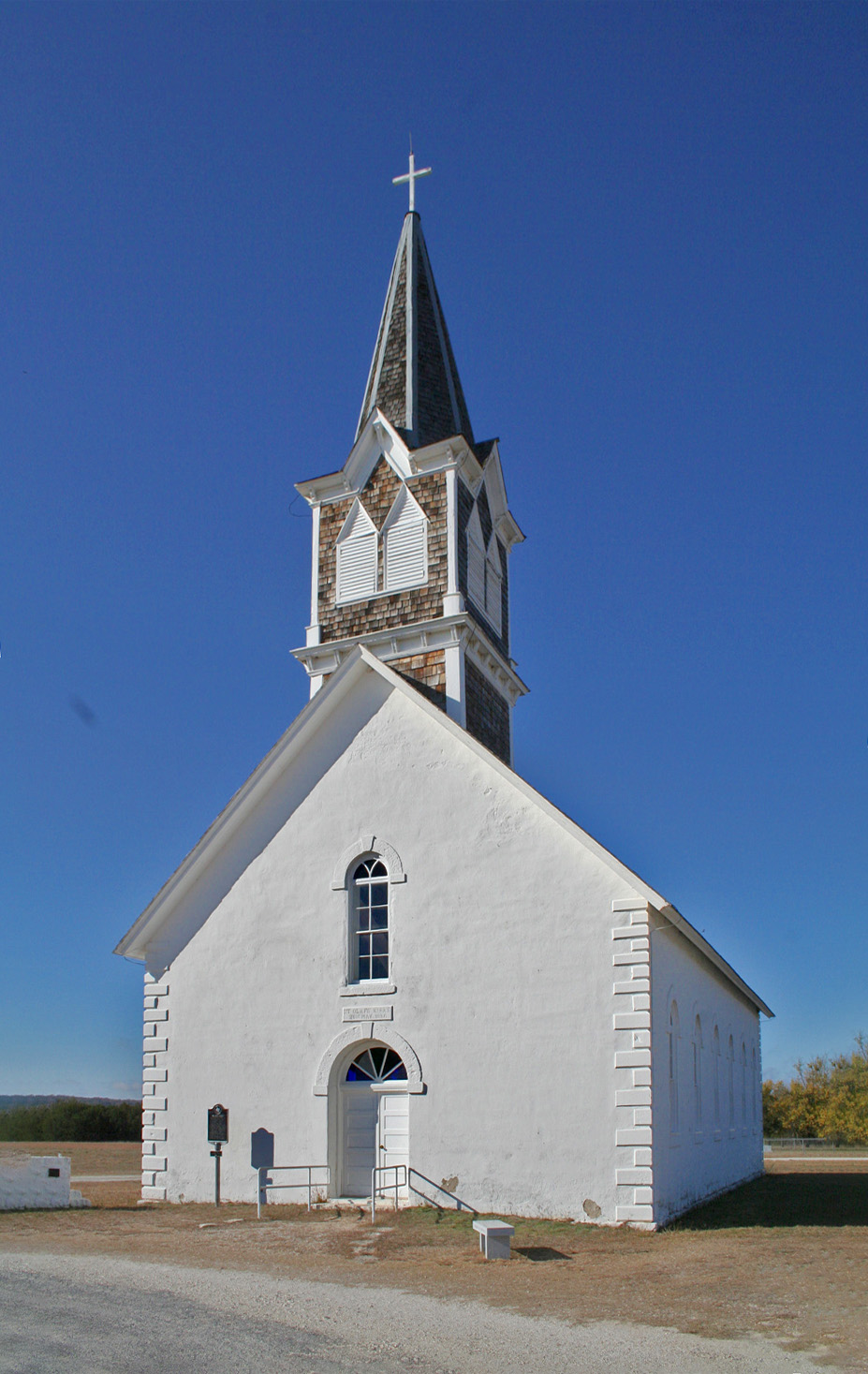
St. Olaf Kirke, constructed in 1884, in Cranfills Gap, Texas.

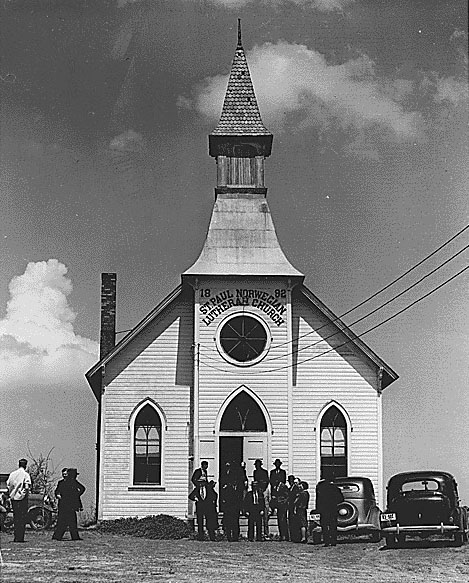
Norwegian Lutheran Church in Irwin, Iowa, in 1941.

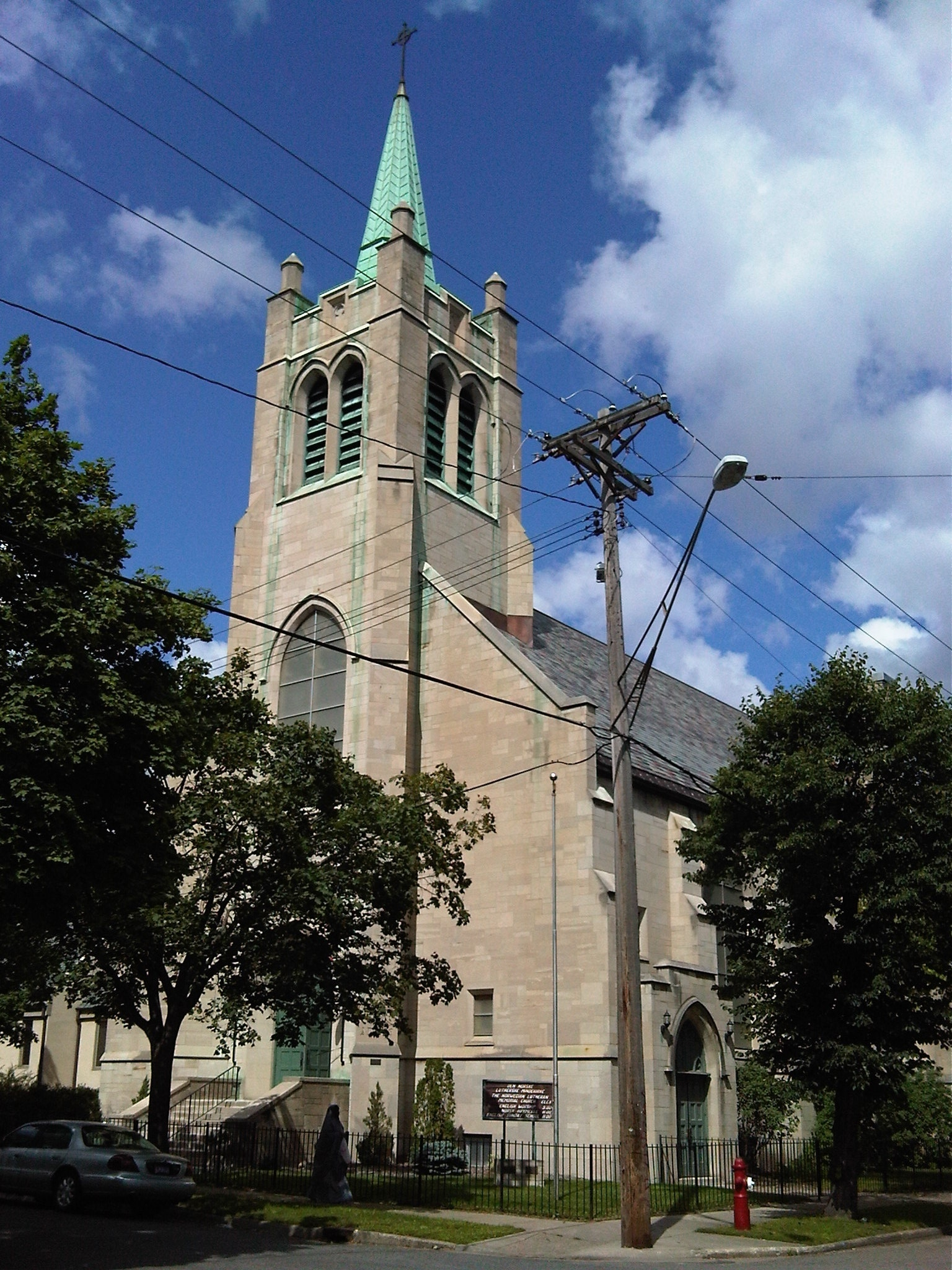
Norwegian Lutheran Memorial Church in Minneapolis, Minnesota, built in 1922.

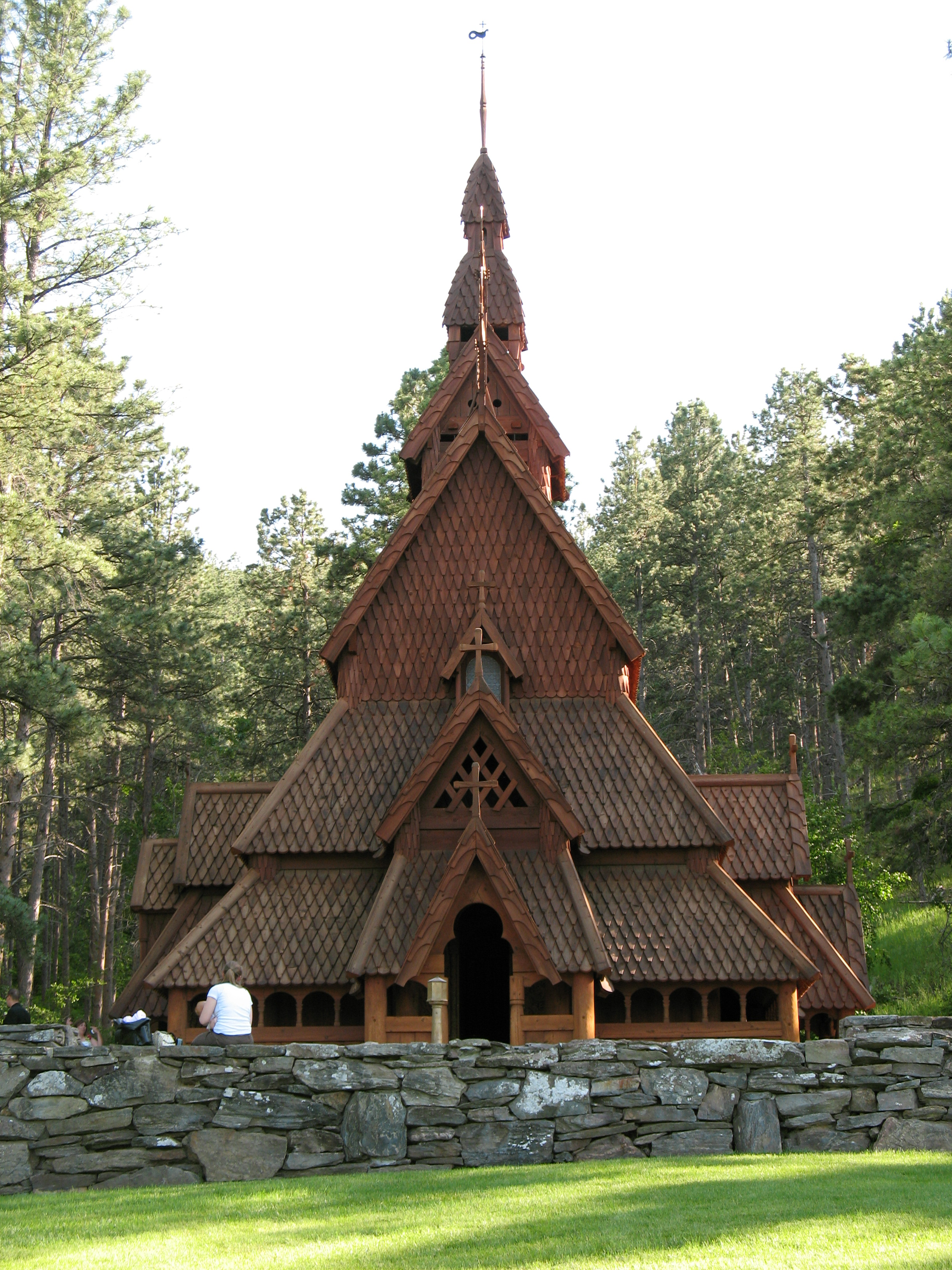
Chapel in the Hills, a replica of an historic stave church, consecrated in 1969 in Rapid City, South Dakota.

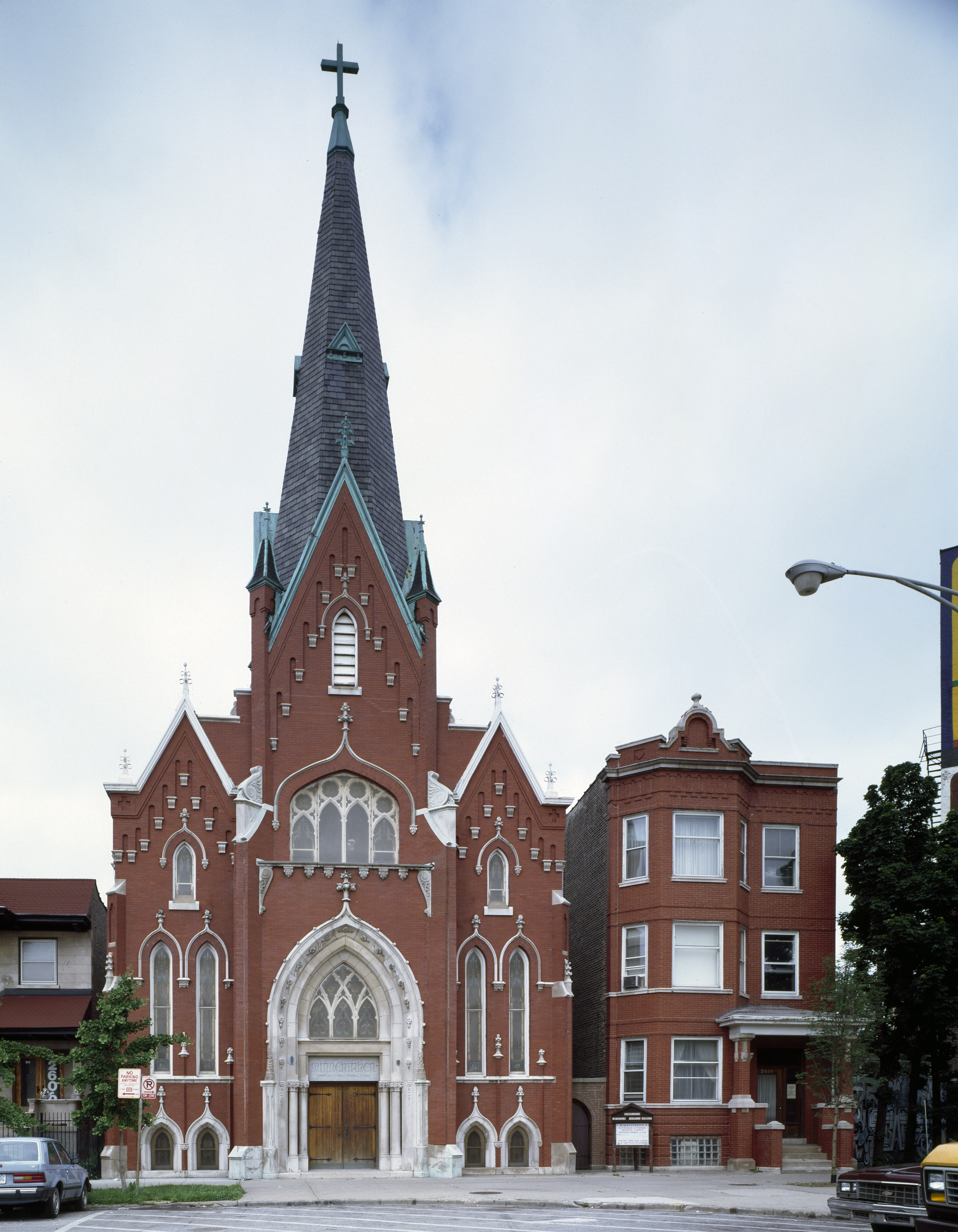
Norwegian Lutheran Memorial Church, or Minnekirken, completed in 1912 in Chicago's Logan Square neighborhood.

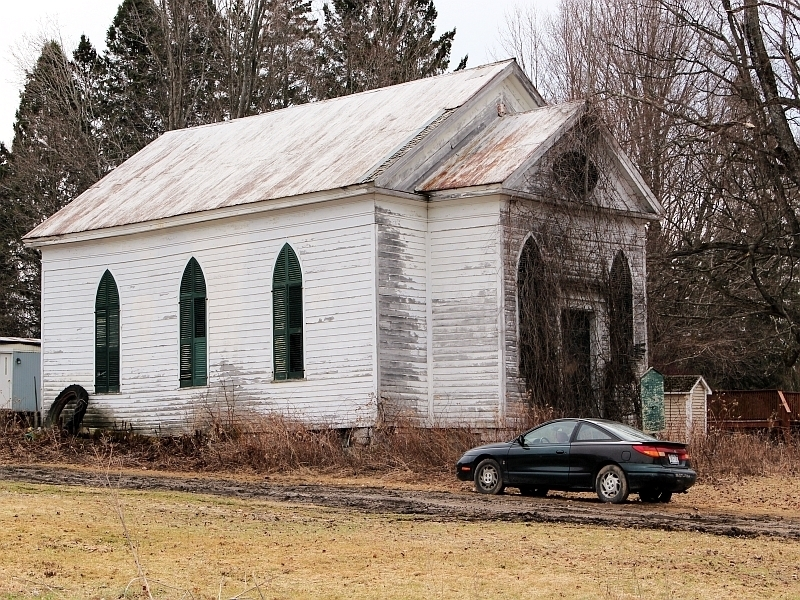
Historic Norwegian church in Herkimer County, New York

== Language usage ==
Norwegian language in the United States

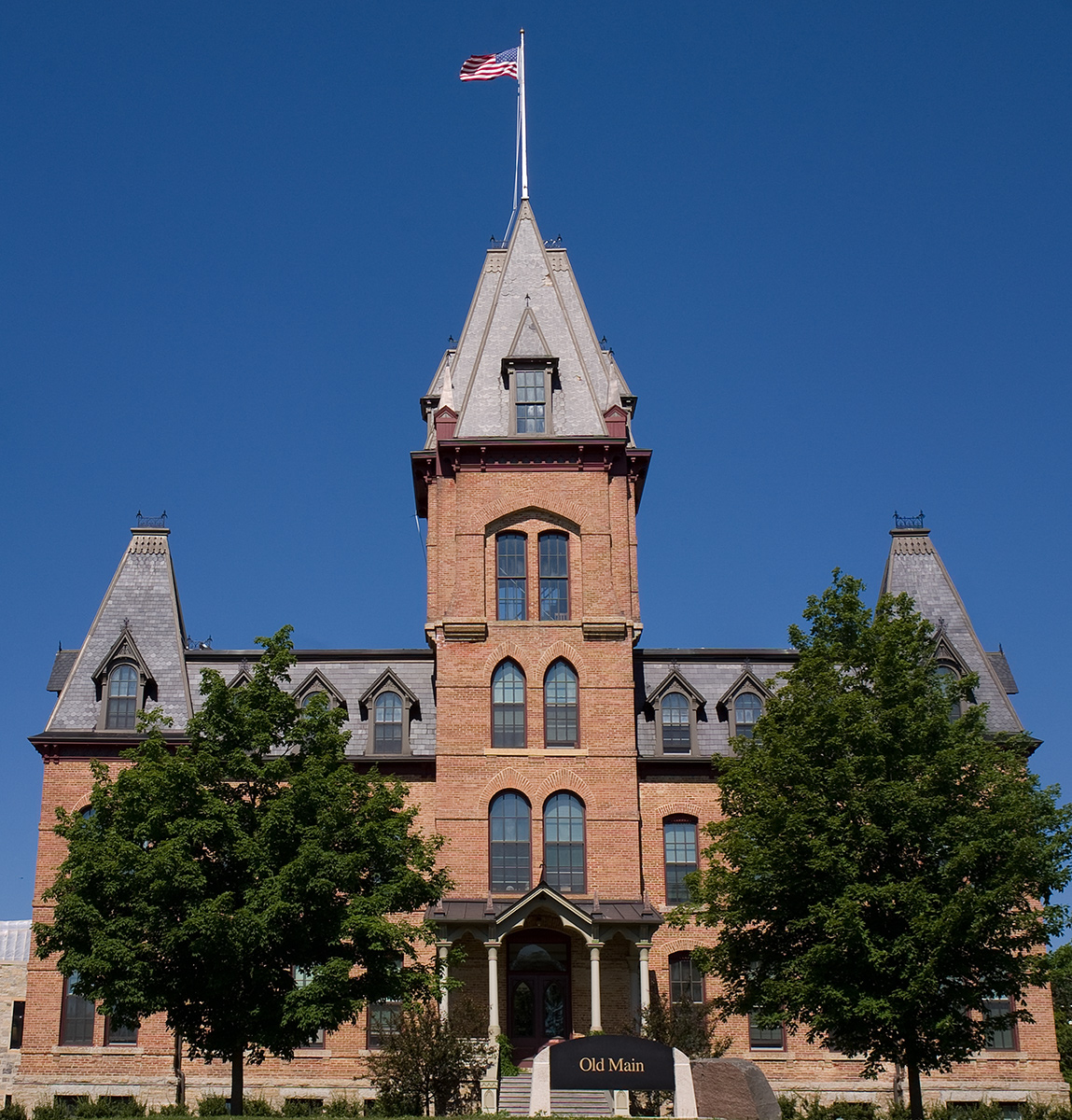
St. Olaf College

Use of the Norwegian language in the United States was at its peak between 1900 and World War I, then declined in the 1920s and 1930s. Over one million Americans spoke Norwegian as their primary language from 1900 to World War I, and more than 3,000 Lutheran churches in the Upper Midwest used Norwegian as their sole language. There were hundreds of Norwegian-language newspapers across the Upper Midwest.

- Decorah Posten and Skandinaven were major Norwegian-language newspapers.
- The Northfield Independent was another notable newspaper. The editor was Andrew Rowberg, who collected massive numbers of Norwegian births and deaths in U.S. The file he created is now known as the Rowberg File; it is maintained at St. Olaf College, and is commonly used in family research across the U.S. and Norway.
- Over 600,000 homes received at least one Norwegian newspaper in 1910.

However, use of the language declined in part due to the rise of nationalism among the American population during and after World War I. During this period, readership of Norwegian-language publications fell. Norwegian Lutheran churches began to hold their services in English, and the younger generation of Norwegian Americans were encouraged to speak English rather than Norwegian. When Norway itself was liberated from Nazi Germany in 1945, relatively few Norwegian Americans under the age of 40 still spoke Norwegian as their primary language (although many still understood the language). As such, they were not passing the language on to their children, the next generation of Norwegian Americans.

According to the U.S. Census however, only 55,475 Americans spoke Norwegian at home as of 2000, and the American Community Survey in 2005 showed that only 39,524 people use the language at home. Still, most Norwegian Americans can speak a common Norwegian with simple words like hello, yes and no. Today, there are still 1,209 people who only understand Norwegian or who do not speak English well in the United States. In 2000 this figure was 215 for those under 17 years old, whereas it increased to 216 in 2005. For other age groups, the numbers went down. For those who are from 18 to 64 years old, went down from 915 in 2000 to 491 in 2005. For those who are older than 65 years it went drastically down from 890 to 502 in the same period.

Many Lutheran colleges that were established by immigrants and people of Norwegian background, such as Luther College in Decorah, Iowa, Pacific Lutheran University in Tacoma, Washington, and St. Olaf College in Northfield, Minnesota, continue to offer Norwegian majors in their undergraduate programs. Many major American universities, such as the University of Washington, University of Oregon, University of Wisconsin–Madison, and the Indiana University offer Norwegian as a language within their Germanic language studies programs.

Two Norwegian Lutheran churches in the United States continue to use Norwegian as a primary liturgical language, Mindekirken in Minneapolis and Minnekirken in Chicago. There are also several Norwegian Seaman's Churches in the U.S. that have services in Norwegian. They are located in Houston, Los Angeles, San Francisco, Miami, New Orleans, and New York.

Literary writing in Norwegian in North America includes the works of Ole Edvart Rølvaag, whose best-known work Giants in the Earth ("I de dage", literally 'In Those Days') was published in both English and Norwegian versions. Rølvaag was a professor from 1906 to 1931 at St. Olaf College, where he was also head of the Norwegian studies department beginning in 1916.

=== Communities by Norwegian speakers ===
As of 2000, U.S. communities with high percentages of people who use Norwegian were:

1. Blair, Wisconsin 8.54%
2. Westby, Wisconsin 7.67%
3. Northwood, North Dakota 4.41%
4. Fertile, Minnesota 4.26%
5. Spring Grove, Minnesota 4.14%
6. Mayville, North Dakota 3.56%
7. Strum, Wisconsin 2.86%
8. Crosby, North Dakota 2.81%
9. Twin Valley, Minnesota 2.54%
10. Velva, North Dakota 2.52%

=== Counties by Norwegian speakers ===
As of 2000, the ten U.S. counties with the highest percentage of Norwegian-language speakers were:

1. Divide County, North Dakota 2.3%
2. Griggs County, North Dakota 2.0%
3. Nelson County, North Dakota 2.0%
4. Norman County, Minnesota 2.0%
5. Traill County, North Dakota 2.0%
6. Vernon County, Wisconsin 1.8%
7. Steele County, North Dakota 1.6%
8. Trempealeau County, Wisconsin 1.6%
9. Lac qui Parle County, Minnesota 1.5%
10. Pennington County, Minnesota 1.0%

=== States by Norwegian speakers ===
State	Age 5–17	Age 18–64	Age 65+	Total (2020)	Total (2005)	Percent (2005)	Total (2000)	Percent (2000)
United States	2,665	16,959	9,313	28,937	39,524	0.0%	55,311	0.0%
California	337	2,305	935	3,577	4,669	0.0%	5,865	0.0%
Washington	174	1,784	1,419	3,377	4,615	0.0%	5,460	0.0%
Texas	312	1,556	281	2,149	2,925	0.0%	2,209	0.0%
New York	51	1,022	983	2,056	2,833	0.0%	4,200	0.0%
Florida	179	1,167	697	2,043	2,043	0.0%	2,709	0.0%
Minnesota	196	844	722	1,762	2,972	0.0%	8,060	0.1%
Wisconsin	60	423	762	1,245	2,533	0.0%	3,520	0.0%
Colorado	184	616	137	937	622	0.0%	1,110	0.0%
Illinois	51	488	315	854	667	0.0%	1,389	0.0%
Utah	55	603	182	840				
North Dakota	14	217	591	822	1,743	0.2%	2,809	0.4%
Oregon		487	205	692	1,018	0.0%	1,105	0.0%
Massachusetts	122	357	186	665				
Pennsylvania	78	358	197	633				
Arizona	85	255	227	567	810	0.0%	1,069	0.0%
New Jersey	54	325	165	544	1,410	0.0%	1,829	0.0%
Maryland	90	282	143	515	621	0.0%	525	0.0%
Michigan	77	321	41	439	507	0.0%	740	0.0%
Virginia	113	282	37	432				
Connecticut	38	252	90	380	793	0.0%	789	0.0%
Alaska	48	254	45	347				
North Carolina		212	118	330	1,258	0.0%	360	0.0%
Georgia (U.S. state)		272	38	310	505	0.0%	255	0.0%
Ohio	25	238	19	282				
Indiana		149	104	253				
Nevada		167	79	246				
Oklahoma		183	45	228				
Rhode Island	23	163	34	220				
South Carolina	48	100	62	210				
Tennessee		198	4	202				
Arkansas	77	113		190				
Iowa		89	80	169	1,044	0.0%	1,150	0.0%
Montana	11	101	55	167	1,146	0.1%	920	0.1%
Alabama	22	64	65	151				
Missouri	12	74	58	144				
Idaho	16	61	38	115				
Nebraska	34	66		100				
New Mexico	9	67	20	96				
Maine		91		91				
District of Columbia		54	28	82				
New Hampshire	20	29	31	80				
Kansas	3	70		73				
South Dakota		38	30	68				
Kentucky	31	33	3	67				
Mississippi		48	10	58				
Vermont		24	7	31				
Louisiana		17	13	30				
West Virginia	16	14		30				
Hawaii		26		26				
Wyoming			12	12				
Delaware				0				

== Demographics ==
=== Immigrants by year or period ===
Year/period	Number of immigrants every year/period
1836–1840	1,200
1841–1845	5,000
1846–1850	12,000
1851–1855	20,270
1856–1860	15,800
1861	8,900
1862	5,250
1863	1,100
1864	4,300
1865	4,000
1866	15,455
1867	12,828
1868	13,209
1869	18,055
1870	14,788
1871	12,055
1872	13,081
1873	9,998
1874	4,565
1875	3,972
1876	4,313
1877	3,195
1878	4,833
1879	7,607
1880	19,615
1881	25,956
1882	28,788
1883	22,167
1884	14,762
1885	13,971
1886	15,123
1887	20,729
1888	21,431
1889	12,624
1890	10,969
1891	13,335
1892	17,040
1893	18,766
1894	11,876
1895	6,161
1896	6,607
1897	4,583
1898	4,819
1899	6,517
1900	10,786
(2010)	1,100
Total (1836–1900)	522,453

=== Population by region ===
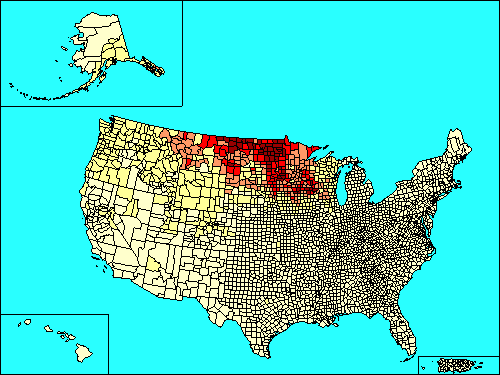
The Distribution of Norwegian Americans according to the 2000 census.

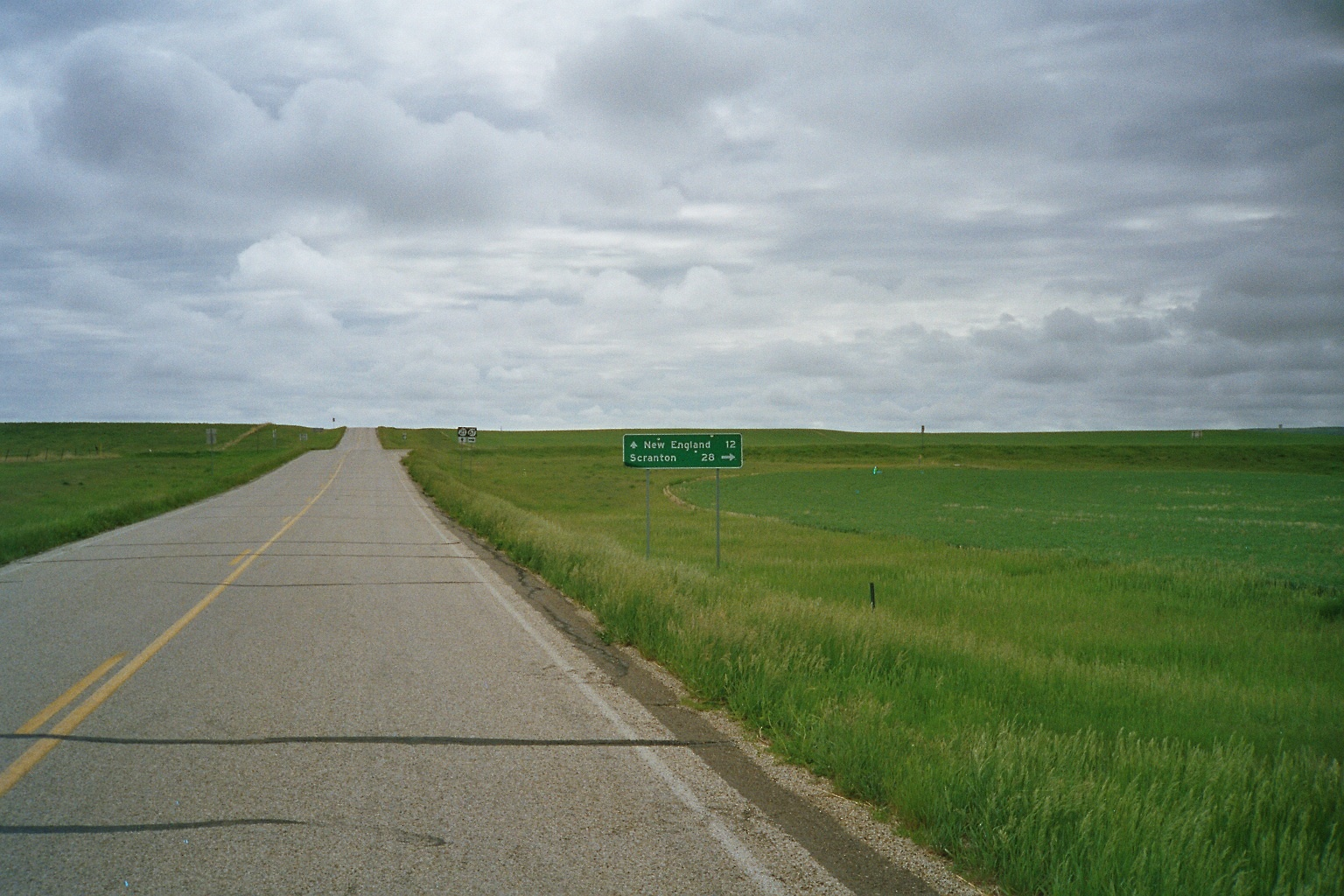
30.8% of the population in the U.S. state of North Dakota is of Norwegian ancestry.

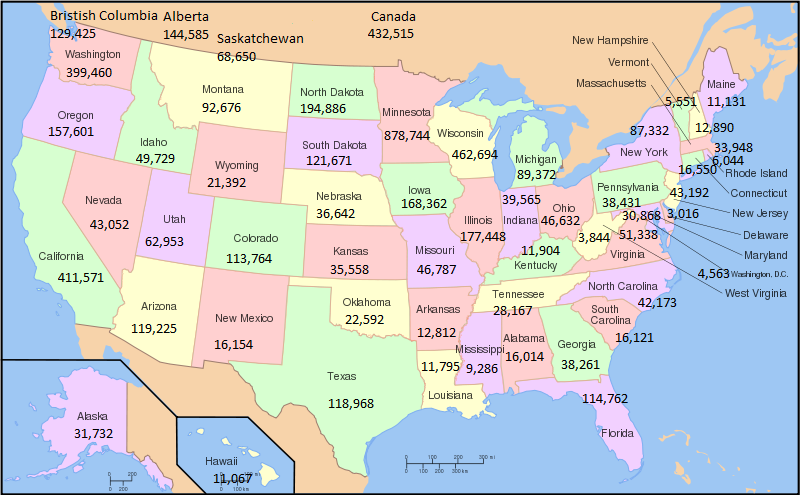
Maps with the numbers of Norwegians in the U.S. states.

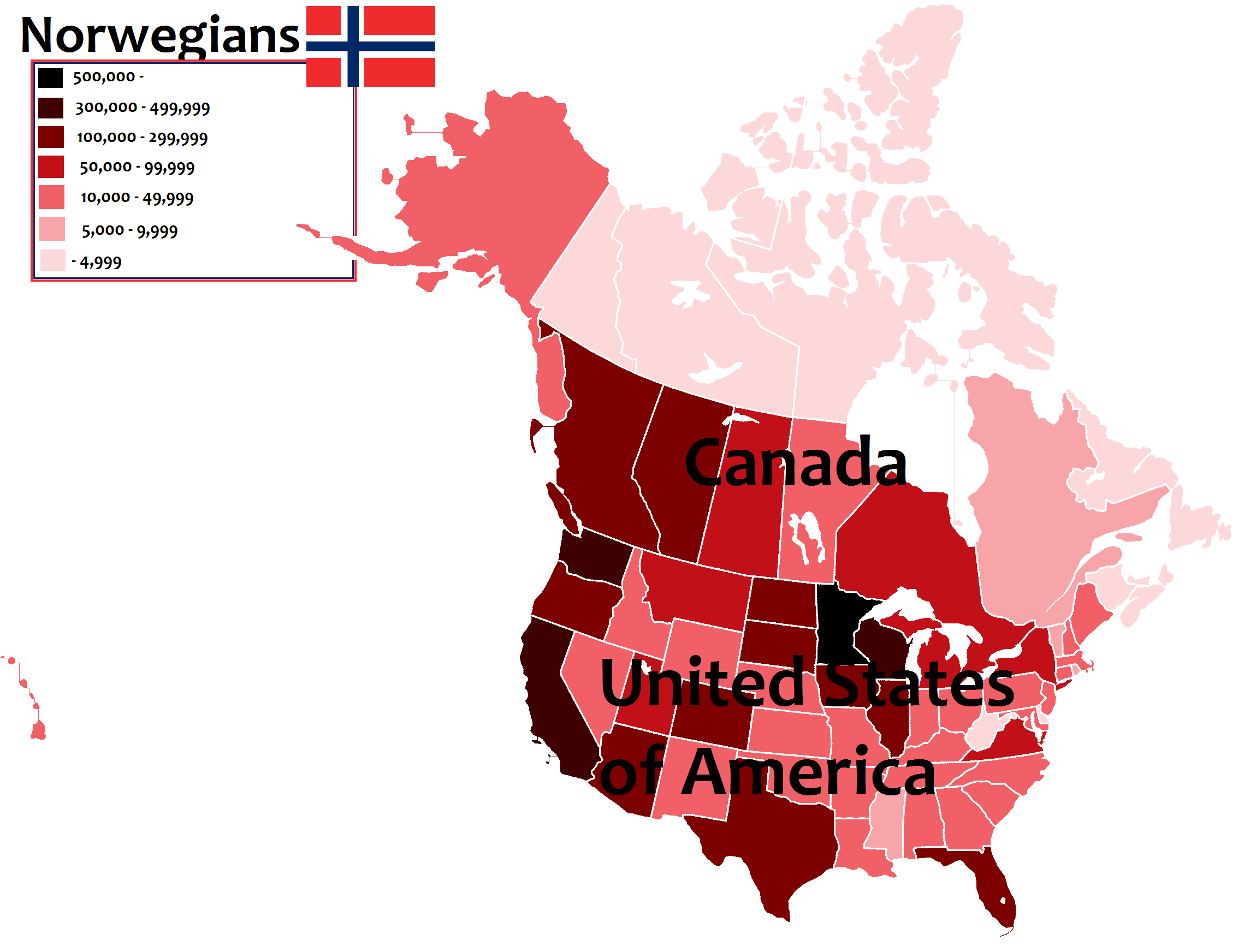
A map of the United States and Canada with number of Norwegian Americans and Norwegian Canadians in every state and province including Washington, D.C.

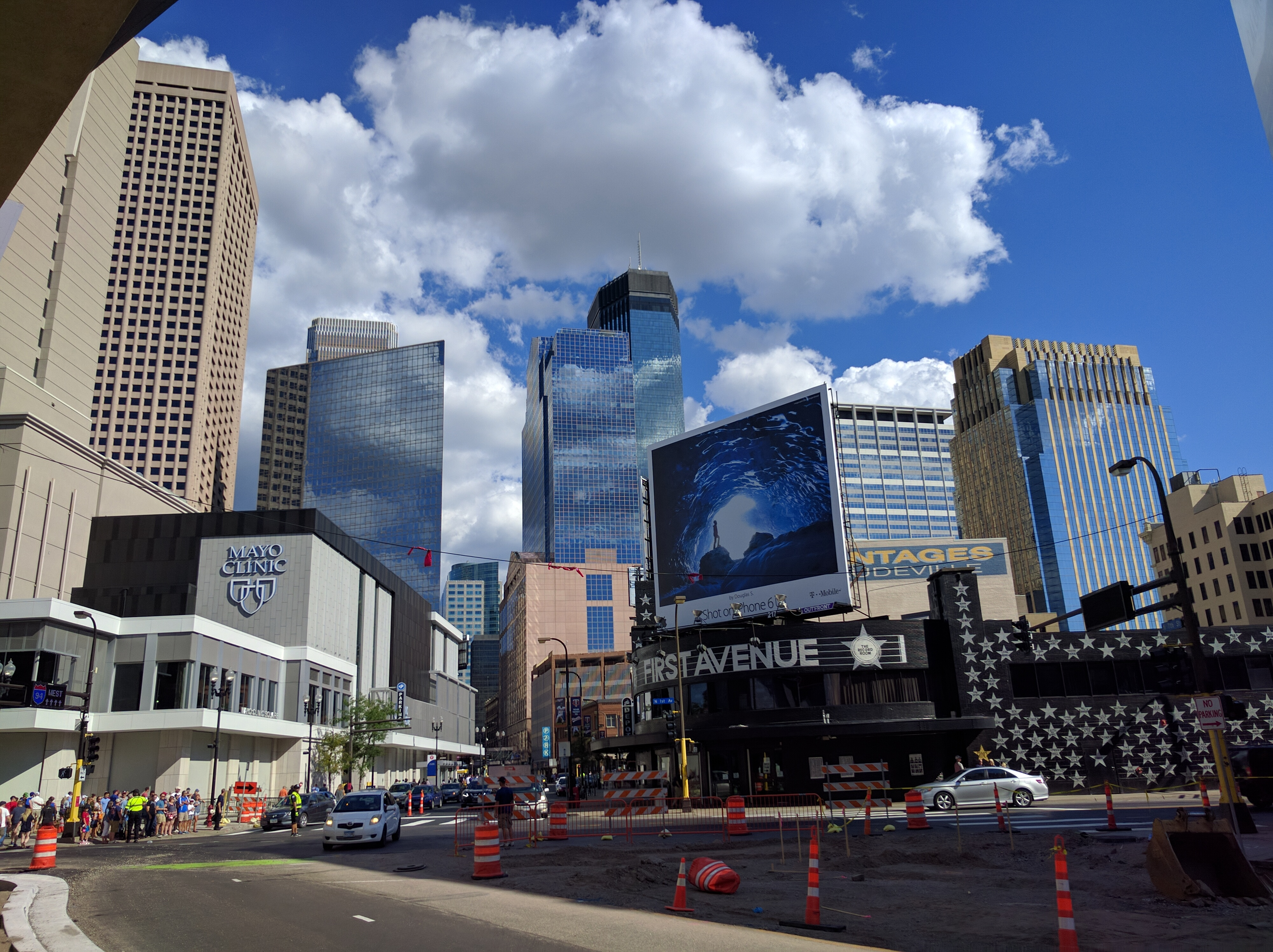
Minneapolis has the largest concentration of Norwegians outside Norway.

Region	Midwest	West	South	Northeast
Norwegian Americans	2,273,683	1,552,462	545,699	266,881
Percent of total population	3.4%	2.1%	0.5%	0.4%
Percent of Norwegian Americans	49.4%	32.9%	12.0%	5.4%

=== Historical population by year ===
Year	United States	Norwegian Americans	Percent	±%
1850	23,191,876	13,000	0.1%	—
1910	92,228,496	1,000,000	1.0%	+7592.3%
1980	226,545,805	3,453,839	1.5%	+245.4%
1990	248,709,873	3,869,395	1.5%	+12.0%
2000	281,421,906	4,477,725	1.6%	+15.7%
2009	304,059,728	4,642,526	1.5%	+3.7%

=== Historical population by state, comparison by census ===
State	Norwegian Americans (1980)	Percent (1980)	Norwegian Americans (1990)	Percent (1990)	Norwegian Americans (2000)	Percent (2000)	Norwegian Americans (2009)	Percent (2009)
United States	3,453,839	1.8%	3,869,395	1.5%	4,477,725	1.6%	4,642,526	1.5%
Minnesota	712,258	19.1%	757,212	17.3%	850,742	17.3%	868,361	16.5%
Wisconsin	391,650	9.1%	416,271	8.5%	454,831	8.5%	466,469	8.2%
California	367,949	1.7%	411,282	1.3%	436,128	1.3%	412,177	1.1%
Washington	286,077	8.1%	333,521	6.8%	367,508	6.2%	410,818	6.2%
North Dakota	184,265	30.1%	189,106	29.6%	193,158	30.1%	199,154	30.8%
Iowa	153,187	6.0%	152,084	5.4%	166,667	5.7%	173,640	5.8%
Illinois	167,995	1.7%	167,003	1.4%	178,923	1.4%	171,745	1.3%
Oregon	113,290	5.1%	124,216	4.3%	147,262	4.3%	164,676	4.3%
Texas	65,335	0.5%	94,096	0.5%	118,968	0.6%	129,081	0.5%
Arizona	44,011	1.8%	70,940	1.9%	106,771	2.1%	124,618	1.9%
Colorado	59,948	2.3%	75,646	2.2%	109,744	2.6%	119,164	2.4%
Florida	56,567	0.7%	90,375	0.6%	114,687	0.7%	117,444	0.6%
South Dakota	98,995	15.8%	106,361	15.2%	115,292	15.3%	113,543	14.0%
New York	94,083	0.6%	90,158	0.5%	90,524	0.5%	92,796	0.5%
Montana	82,579	12.0%	86,460	10.8%	95,525	10.6%	90,425	9.3%
Michigan	72,084	0.8%	72,261	0.7%	85,753	0.9%	86,872	0.9%
Utah	30,053	2.3%	36,178	2.0%	60,567	2.7%	70,946	2.5%
Virginia	24,409	0.5%	35,815	0.5%	46,877	0.7%	49,826	0.6%
Idaho	27,840	3.4%	32,956	3.2%	46,308	3.6%	47,891	3.1%
Pennsylvania	25,447	0.2%	31,146	0.2%	38,869	0.3%	47,839	0.4%
North Carolina	10,775	0.2%	20,184	0.3%	32,627	0.4%	47,136	0.5%
Missouri	23,580	0.5%	29,531	0.5%	40,887	0.7%	45,428	0.8%
New Jersey	42,697	0.6%	46,991	0.6%	48,403	0.6%	44,010	0.5%
Ohio	27,410	0.3%	31,911	0.2%	41,537	0.4%	42,658	0.4%
Nebraska	27,522	1.9%	30,533	1.9%	39,536	2.3%	39,921	2.2%
Nevada	14,531	2.1%	23,229	1.9%	38,353	1.9%	38,154	1.4%
Georgia (U.S. state)	12,214	0.3%	21,388	0.3%	33,858	0.4%	35,881	0.4%
Massachusetts	29,015	0.5%	30,726	0.5%	36,106	0.6%	34,355	0.5%
Indiana	21,725	0.5%	25,978	0.4%	34,174	0.6%	33,650	0.5%
Kansas	18,635	0.9%	21,878	0.8%	29,773	1.1%	32,242	1.1%
Maryland	18,783	0.5%	22,520	0.4%	27,131	0.5%	31,020	0.5%
Alaska	15,100	4.6%	23,087	4.1%	26,439	4.2%	30,366	4.3%
Tennessee	9,122	0.2%	12,098	0.2%	21,654	0.4%	28,009	0.4%
Oklahoma	14,065	0.6%	17,401	0.5%	21,923	0.6%	23,507	0.6%
Connecticut	18,157	0.6%	19,004	0.5%	21,693	0.6%	18,403	0.5%
New Mexico	9,909	0.8%	13,936	0.9%	18,088	1.0%	18,078	0.9%
Alabama	6,521	0.2%	8,489	0.2%	13,779	0.3%	17,230	0.4%
Wyoming	15,263	3.8%	18,047	3.9%	21,204	4.3%	16,900	3.1%
South Carolina	5,897	0.2%	9,170	0.2%	14,279	0.4%	14,916	0.3%
Arkansas	6,185	0.3%	8,778	0.3%	13,046	0.5%	13,293	0.5%
Kentucky	5,693	0.2%	7,355	0.1%	10,826	0.3%	12,345	0.3%
New Hampshire	5,592	0.7%	8,401	0.7%	10,301	0.8%	11,229	0.8%
Louisiana	8,121	0.2%	9,510	0.2%	11,520	0.3%	11,128	0.2%
Maine	5,472	0.5%	7,256	0.5%	9,827	0.8%	9,008	0.7%
Hawaii	7,707	0.8%	9,054	0.8%	9,632	0.8%	8,249	0.6%
Mississippi	3,384	0.1%	4,052	0.1%	7,088	0.2%	6,226	0.2%
Delaware	2,511	0.5%	3,036	0.4%	3,941	0.5%	4,777	0.5%
Rhode Island	3,560	0.4%	4,010	0.3%	4,307	0.4%	4,697	0.4%
Vermont	2,454	0.5%	3,537	0.6%	4,498	0.7%	4,544	0.7%
West Virginia	2,211	0.1%	2,598	0.1%	3,855	0.2%	3,880	0.2%
District of Columbia	2,006	0.3%	2,620	0.4%	2,336	0.4%	3,801	0.6%
Puerto Rico					318	0.0%	172	0.0%

== Notable people ==
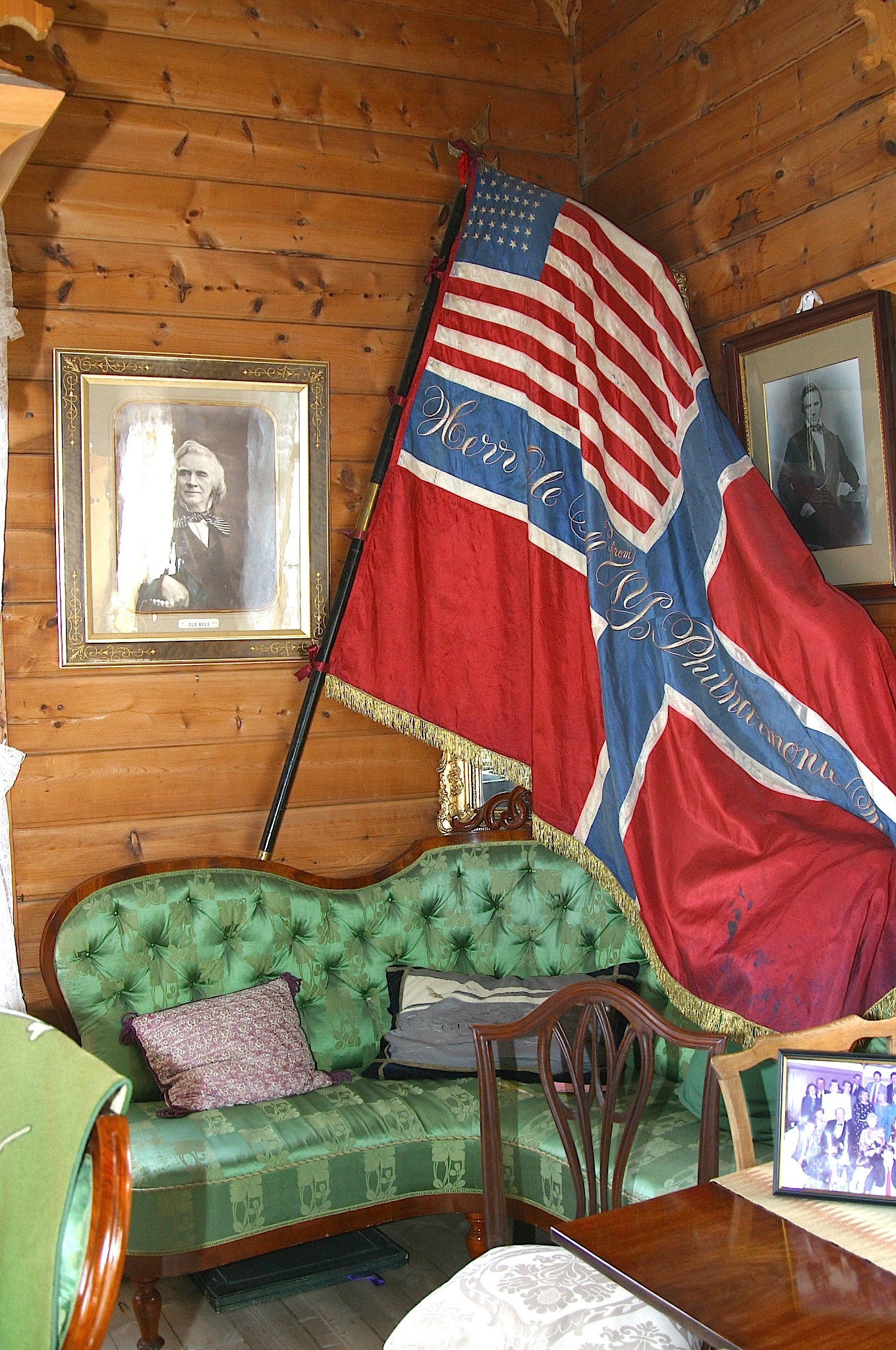
This patriotic fantasy in flag was given to the American friend, violinist and composer Ole Bull (1818–1880) as a gift from The New York Philharmonic Society. The flag of Norway has been the U.S. star banner that the union mark instead of the Norwegian-Swedish "Sildesalaten".

In entertainment, Sigrid Gurie, "the siren of the fjords," starred in numerous motion pictures in the 1930s and 1940s. Other Hollywood actors and personalities with one Norwegian parent or grandparent include James Arness, Paris Hilton, James Cagney, Peter Graves, Tippi Hedren, Lance Henriksen, Celeste Holm, Kristanna Loken, Robert Mitchum, Mary-Kate and Ashley Olsen, Elizabeth Olsen, Piper Perabo, Chris Pratt, Priscilla Presley, Michelle Williams, Rainn Wilson and Renée Zellweger. Seminal protopunk musicians Iggy Pop of The Stooges and David Johansen of the New York Dolls and Don Dokken of the heavy metal band Dokken have Norwegian ancestry. Paul Waaktaar-Savoy of the synth pop band a-ha is Norwegian, having been born and raised in Oslo. He is a naturalized American citizen and has homes in both Oslo and New York City.

In journalism, Eric Sevareid, was a well-known CBS reporter and commentator. In literature, Ole Edvart Rølvaag wrote about the immigrant experience, especially the Norwegian-American experience in the Dakotas. Rølvaag's home is a National Historic Landmark. Tomi Lahren is a Fox Nation host and former host of her own The Blaze TV show as well as a FOX News commentator.

In labor unions, Andrew Furuseth was largely responsible for the passage of four reforms that changed the lives of American mariners. Two of them, the Maguire Act of 1895 and the White Act of 1898, ended corporal punishment and abolished imprisonment for deserting a vessel. The Seamen's Act of 1915 included all these and was his main project.

Minnesota Democratic Senators Hubert Humphrey and Walter Mondale served as the 38th and 42nd vice presidents of the United States, respectively, and were nominees for president in 1968 and 1984, respectively. Earl Warren of California was the 14th Chief Justice of the United States. Pete Hegseth is the incumbent Secretary of Defense.

In science, Ernest Lawrence won the Nobel Prize in Physics in 1939. Lars Onsager won the 1968 Nobel Prize in Chemistry. Norman Borlaug, father of the Green Revolution, won the Nobel Peace Prize in 1970. Christian B. Anfinsen won the Nobel Prize for chemistry in 1972. Ivar Giaever won the Nobel Prize in Physics 1973. Carl Richard Hagen is noted for his work in physics.

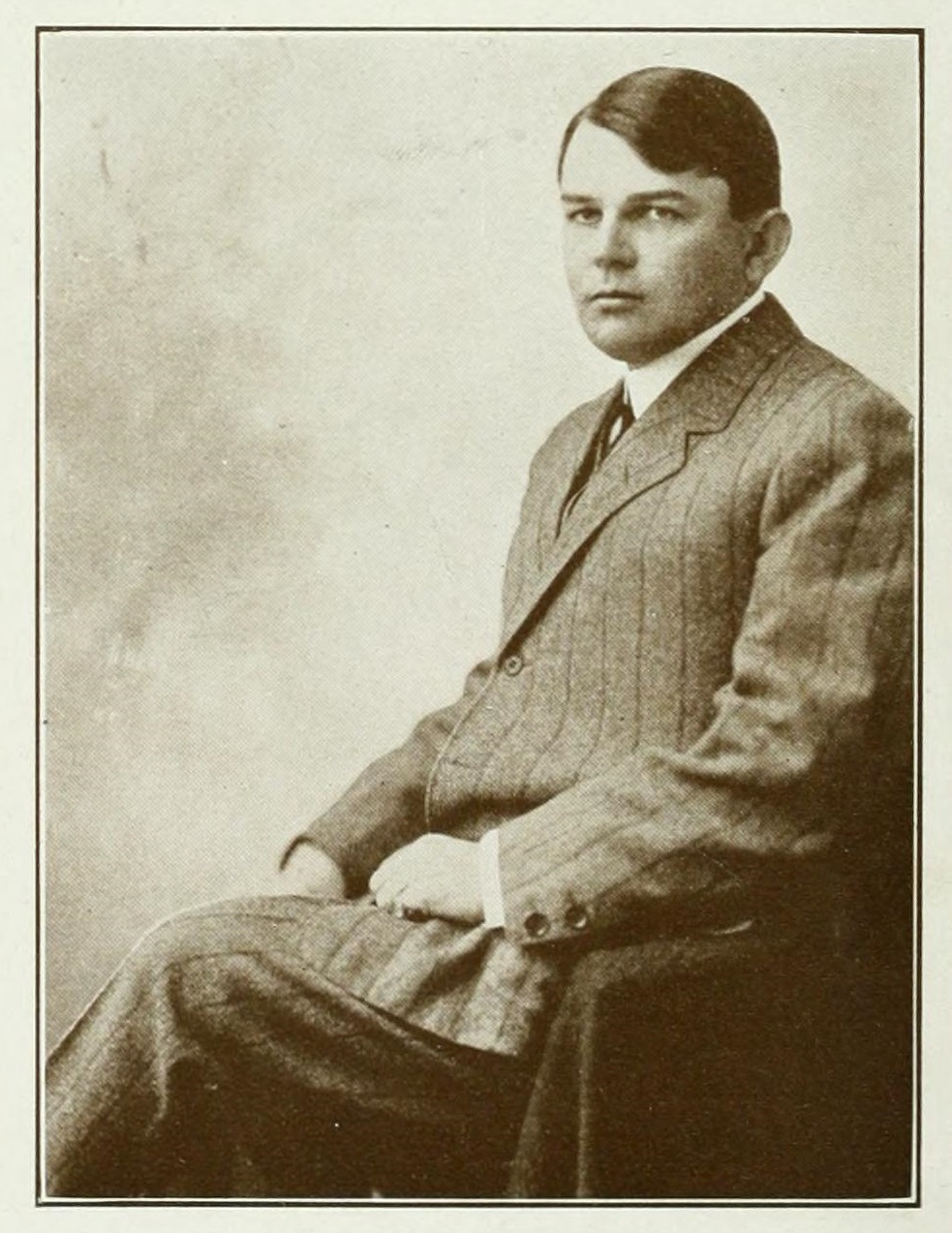
Photo of Edwin Bergstrom, known for designing The Pentagon

In engineering, Clayton Jacobson II is credited with the invention of the modern personal watercraft. Ole Singstad was a pioneer of underwater tunnels. Ole Evinrude invented the first outboard motor with practical commercial application, recognizable today on modern motorboats. Astronaut Deke Slayton was the docking module pilot for the Apollo–Soyuz mission, the first crewed international spaceflight.

In religion, Olaf M. Norlie created the Simplified New Testament. Herman Amberg Preus was a key leader in the development of the Synod of the Norwegian Evangelical Lutheran Church in America. Bernt Julius Muus was the principal founder and Thorbjorn N. Mohn was the first president of St. Olaf College. Peter Laurentius Larsen and Ulrik Vilhelm Koren both helped found Luther College in Iowa.

In business, Ole Bardahl founded the Bardahl company, Conrad Nicholson Hilton was the founder of the Hilton Hotels chain, Kenneth Harry Olsen co-founded Digital Equipment Corporation, James Trane and Reuben Trane founded Trane Inc., N. O. Nelson was the founder of the N. O. Nelson Manufacturing Co. and Alfred M. Moen founded Moen Incorporated. Gary Kildall, creator of the CP/M operating system, founded Digital Research in 1974.

In sports, Knute Rockne became one of the greatest coaches in college football history, while Babe Zaharias was named by the Guinness Book of Records as the most versatile female athlete of all time. Zaharias achieved outstanding success in golf, basketball and track and field athletics. Additionally, Stein Eriksen won the gold medal in the Giant Slalom event at the 1952 Winter Olympics, which were held in Oslo, Norway. He also won a silver medal in the slalom race. Eriksen was the first skier from outside the Alps to win an Olympic men's alpine gold medal. He also won three gold medals at the 1954 World Championships in Åre, Sweden, and a bronze medal at the 1950 World Championships in Aspen, Colorado. Shortly after his success in the 1952 Olympics, Eriksen moved to America where he continues to live. He worked as a ski-instructor and ski school-director at various ski schools such as Sugarbush in Vermont, and Aspen in Colorado. He is currently director of skiing at the Deer Valley Resort in Utah, and also serves as host of the Stein Eriksen Lodge, a ski lodge in Deer Valley, Utah.

In medicine, Owen Harding Wangensteen was a surgeon and inventor known for surgical teaching and innovation at the University of Minnesota. He developed the Wangensteen Historical Library of Biology and Medicine. Earl Bakken developed the first wearable transistorized pacemaker and founded the Fortune 500 medical technology company Medtronic as well as the Bakken Museum. John H. Lawrence is known as the father of nuclear medicine. As many historians claim, the genesis of this medical specialty in the United States took place in 1936, when John Lawrence took a leave of absence from his faculty position at Yale Medical School in order to visit his brother Ernest Lawrence at his new radiation laboratory (now known as the Lawrence Berkeley National Laboratory) in Berkeley, California.

In humanitarian work, Greg Mortenson, born in Minnesota, whose ancestors came from Tromsø in 1876, has worked since 1993 to build over 150 schools for girls in Pakistan and Afghanistan. He is the author of best-seller Three Cups of Tea, which has sold over 4 million copies in 49 countries, including Norway.

== See also ==
- Norwegian Canadians—whose history is interlinked with that of Norwegian Americans.
- Nordic and Scandinavian Americans
- Norwegian Minnesotan
- Norwegian Dakotan
