= Norwegian Lutheran Memorial Church (Minneapolis) =

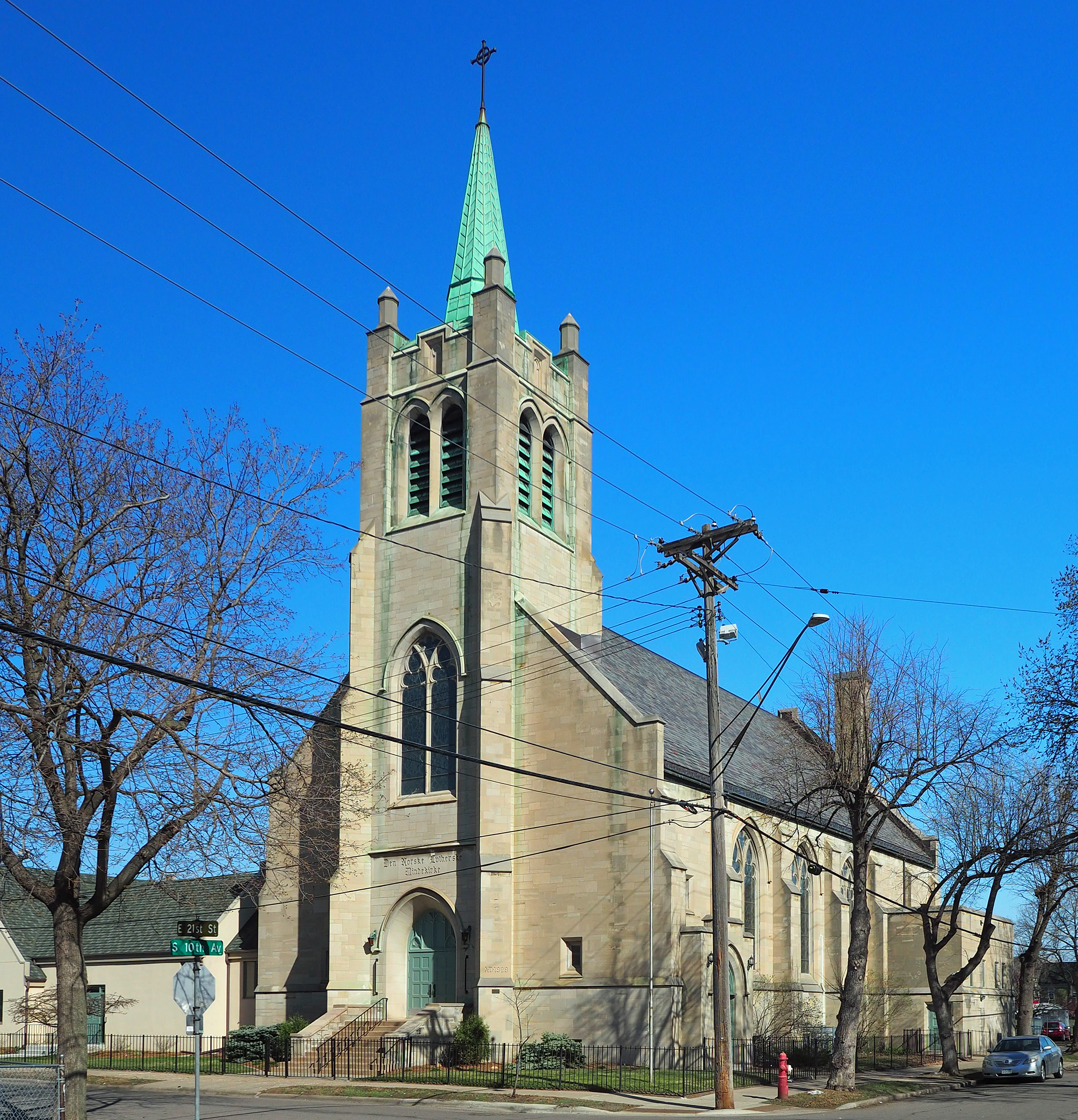
- The Norwegian Lutheran Memorial Church from the southeast
- Norwegian Lutheran Memorial Church
- 44°57′44″N 93°15′36″W
- Address: 924 E. 21st Street, Minneapolis, Minnesota
- Country: United States
- Denomination: Lutheran

History
- Founded: 1922

Architecture
- Completed: 1930

Mindekirken altar

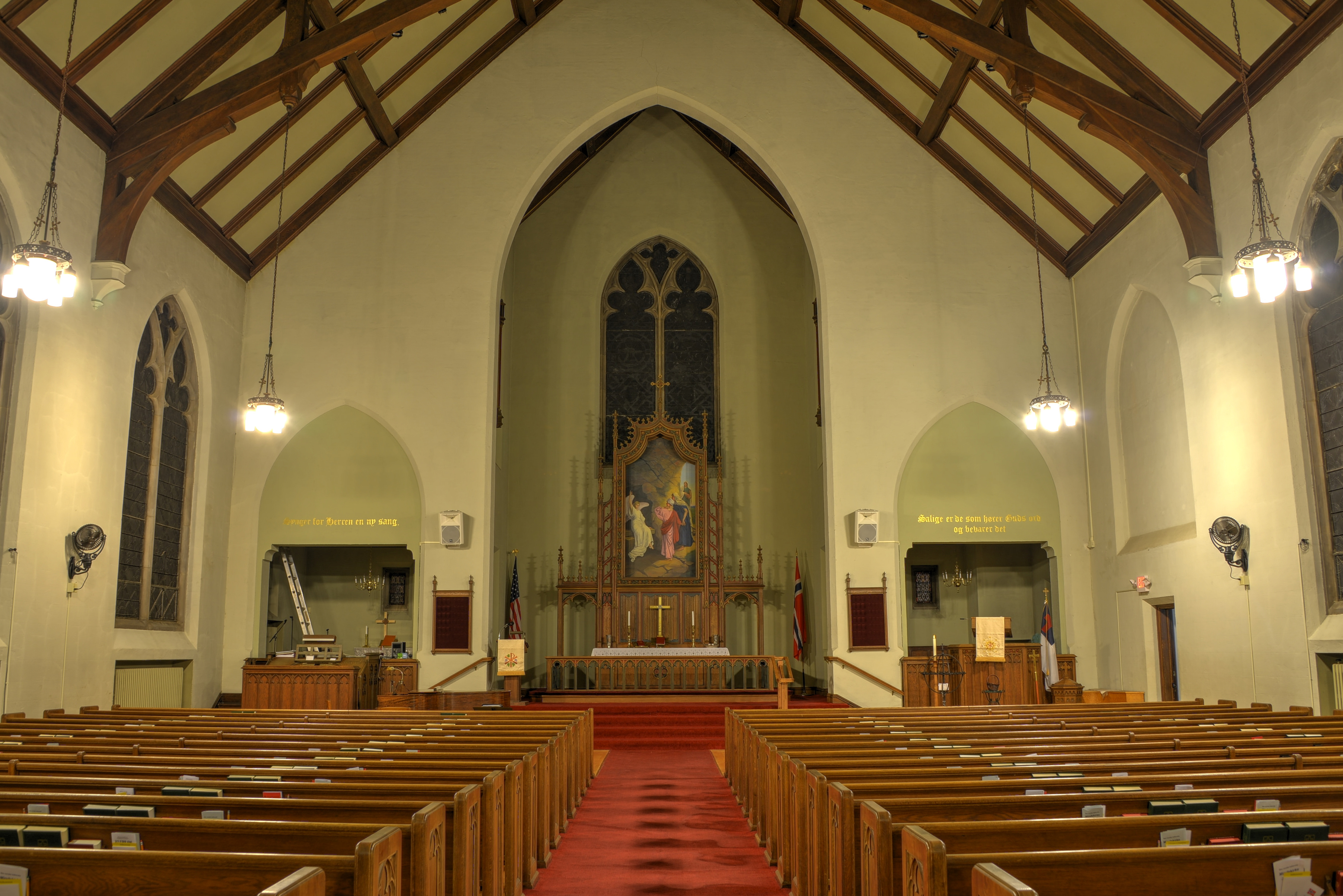
Mindekirken interior view at night

The Norwegian Lutheran Memorial Church of Minneapolis (Norwegian Den Norske Lutherske Mindekirke), better known as Mindekirken, is a Lutheran church in Minneapolis, Minnesota, United States. It is one of two American churches still using Norwegian as a primary liturgical language, the other being Minnekirken in Chicago. King Harald V of Norway is the church's patron.

== History ==
The congregation of Mindekirken was formed in 1922 by the Norwegian Lutheran Church of America in response to the rapid abandonment of Norwegian in favor of English among Norwegian Lutheran churches at that time.

The Norse-American Centennial Celebration that was held in Saint Paul, Minnesota, in 1925 to commemorate the 1825 arrival of the Norwegian immigrant ship Restaurationen helped provide the impetus for a "memorial" church to be built to house the new congregation, to serve as a living memorial to Norwegian immigration. Mindekirken was finally dedicated on May 4, 1930.

The church has been visited by members of the Norwegian royal family on several occasions. King Olav V of Norway visited on November 4, 1975 near the Sequicentennial of the Restauration voyage. HM Queen Sonja visited on October 16, 2022 to celebrate the congregation's centennial, on the same weekend as Her Majesty headlined grand opening celebrations for neighboring Norway House's Innovation and Culture Center.

To celebrate the 2025 Bicentennial of the Restauration's 1825 voyage, Mindekirken will dedicate a model church ship of Restaurationen to hang in the sanctuary.

== Mission ==
Mindekirken's mission statement reads: "To serve as a spiritual center for the Scandinavian American Community, worshiping in both Norwegian and English. To be a warm and inviting place for visitors and members alike, where people join in fellowship across different ages and cultural backgrounds. To encourage activities such as Leiv Eriksson International Festival, Syttende Mai Celebration, concerts, festive dinners and language classes."

== See also ==
- Mindekirken is located in the Ventura Village neighborhood within the Phillips community of Minneapolis, MN.
- Mindekirken is in the Minneapolis Area Synod of the ELCA.
- Mindekirken was originally a member of the American Lutheran Church (ALC), until January 1, 1988, when it merged with the Lutheran Church in America (LCA) and the Association of Evangelical Lutheran Churches (AELC), thus creating the largest Lutheran church body in the United States.
