= Chapel in the Hills =

Church in South Dakota, United States

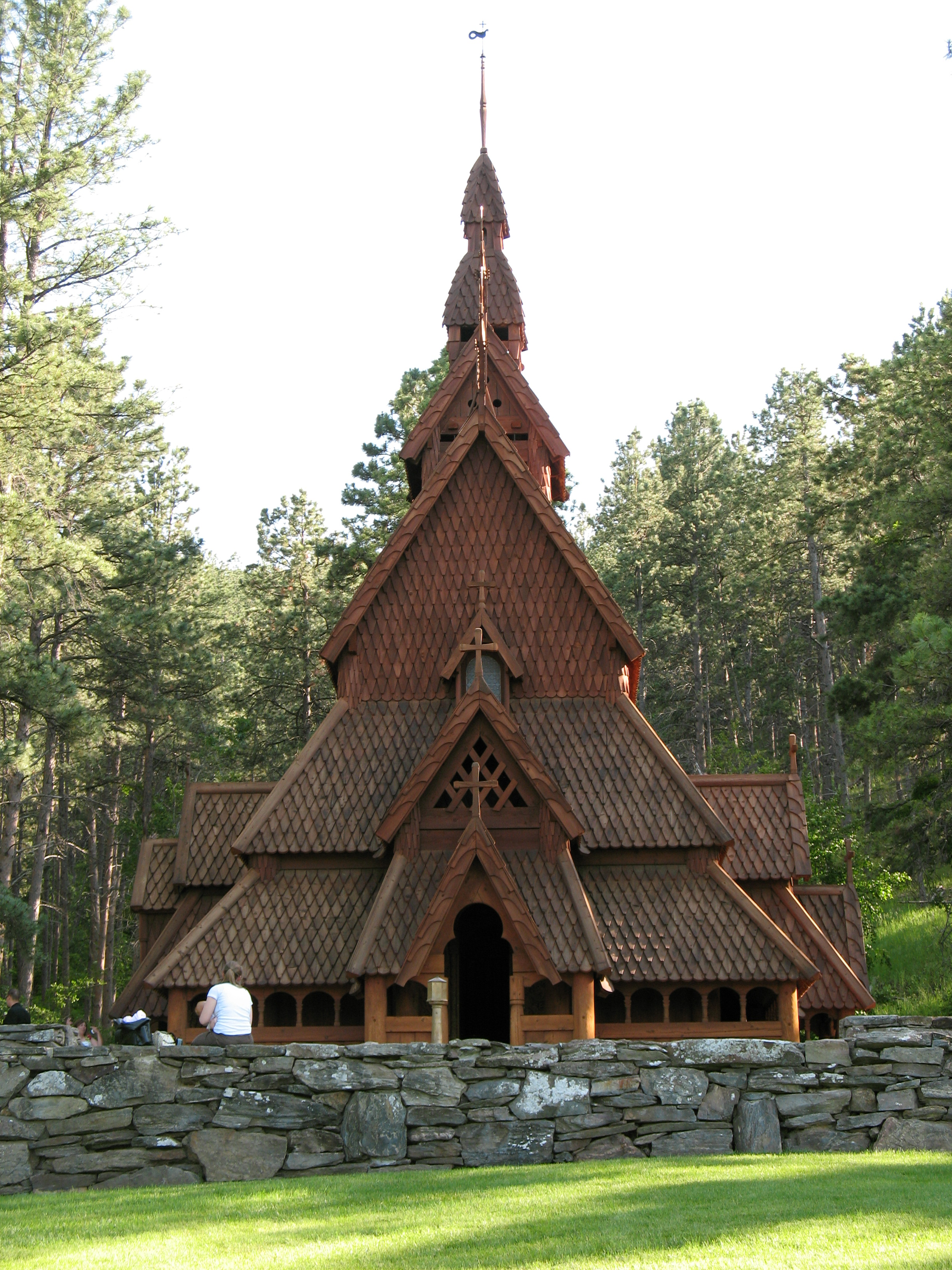

Religion
- Affiliation: Evangelical Lutheran Church in America
- Year consecrated: 1969

Location
- Location: Rapid City, South Dakota, United States
- Interactive map of Chapel in the Hills
- Coordinates: 44.048398°N 103.298714°W

Architecture
- Architects: Spitznagel and Partners
- Style: Stave church
- General contractor: Dilly Construction Company
- Groundbreaking: 1968
- Completed: 1969
- Chapel in the Hills
- U.S. National Register of Historic Places
- Location: 3788 Chapel Ln. Rapid City, South Dakota
- NRHP reference No.: 12000487
- Added to NRHP: August 7, 2012

Website
- Chapel in the Hills

Chapel in the Hills is a stave church located near Rapid City, South Dakota, United States.

== History ==
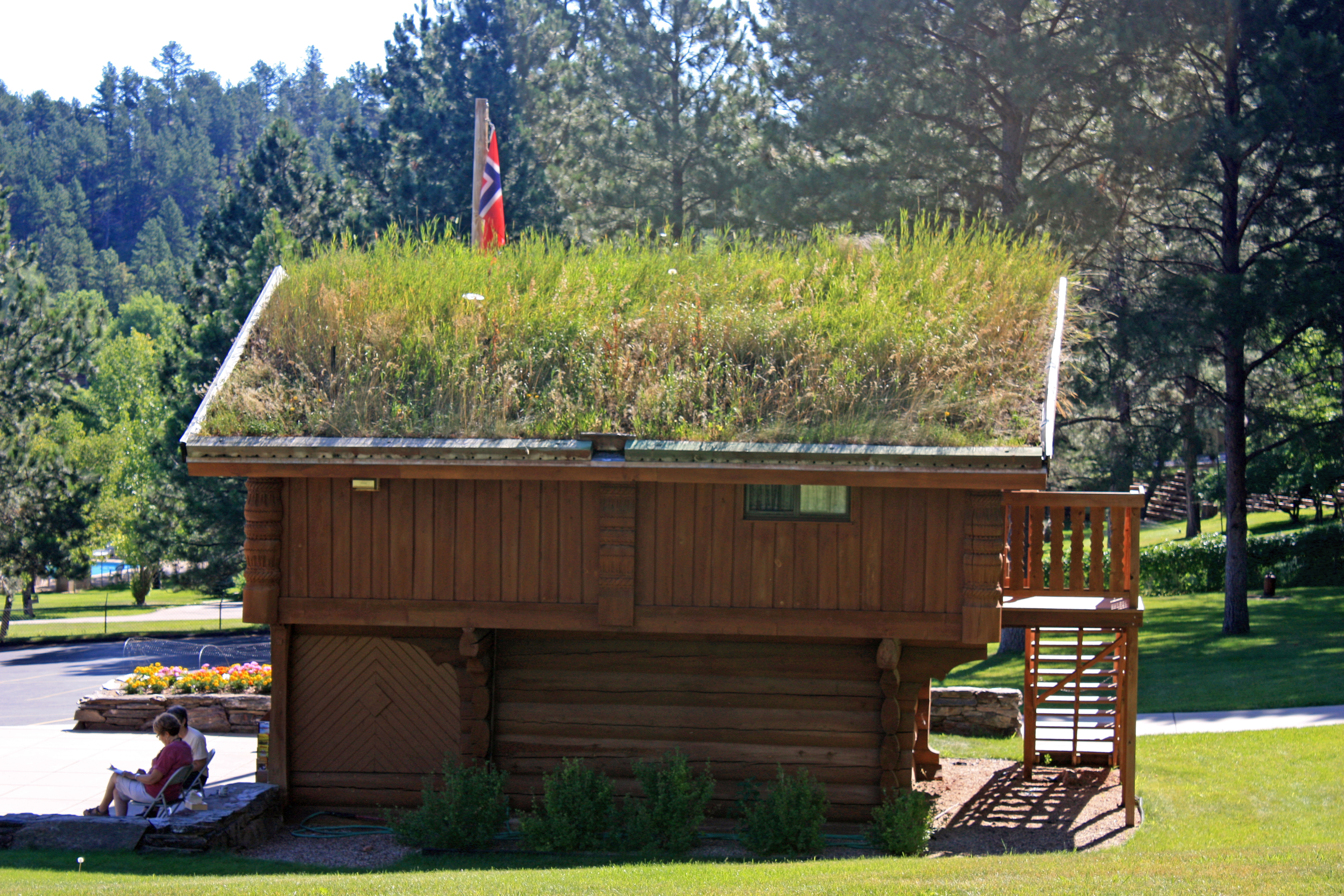
Visitor center

The Chapel in the Hills was dedicated on July 6, 1969, as the home for the radio ministry of Lutheran Vespers. Lutheran Vespers hosts such as, Richard A. Jensen were broadcast nationwide from this location in the Black Hills. The church is a special ministry of the South Dakota Synod of the Evangelical Lutheran Church in America.

The Chapel in the Hills is an exact replica of the Borgund stave church in Norway. The Borgund stavkirke was built around the year 1150 and is considered the most completely preserved stave church still standing in Norway.

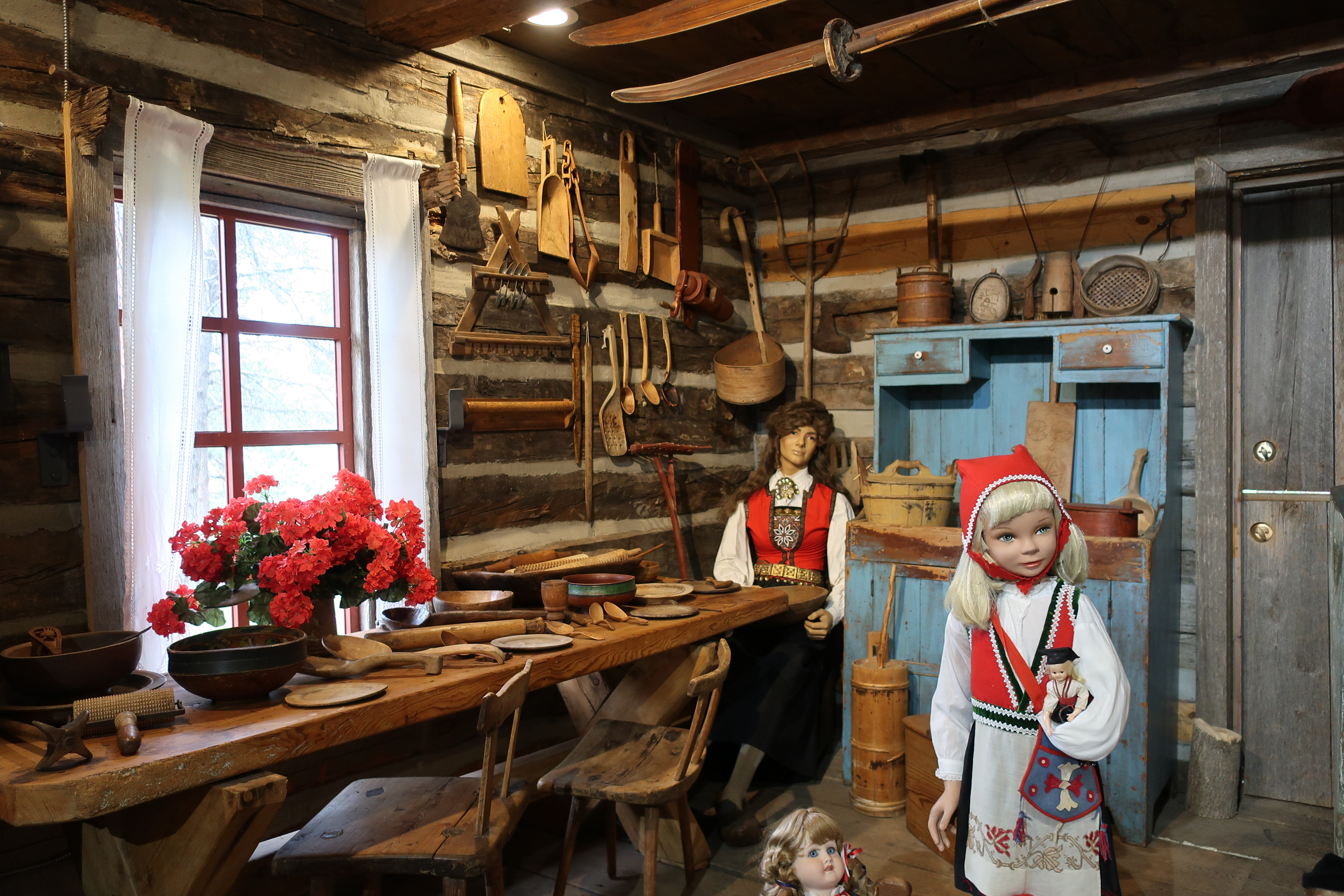
Inside the log cabin museum

The Norwegian Department of Antiquities provided a set of blueprints of the Borgund church to be used in the construction of the Chapel in the Hills. The woodcarvings resulted from the combined effort by Norwegian woodcarver Erik Fridstrøm and Rapid City resident, Helge Christiansen.

The site includes an authentic log cabin museum that was built in 1876 by Edward Nielsen, a Norwegian immigrant gold prospector from Hole, Ringerike, Norway. There is also a stabbur, a grass-roofed house, that serves as the visitor center and gift shop.

== Other sources ==
- Malmin, Olaf Gabriel Chapel in the Hills : A notable church structure in Rapid City, South Dakota (Rapid City, 1969)
