= Abbie Betinis =

American composer (born 1980)

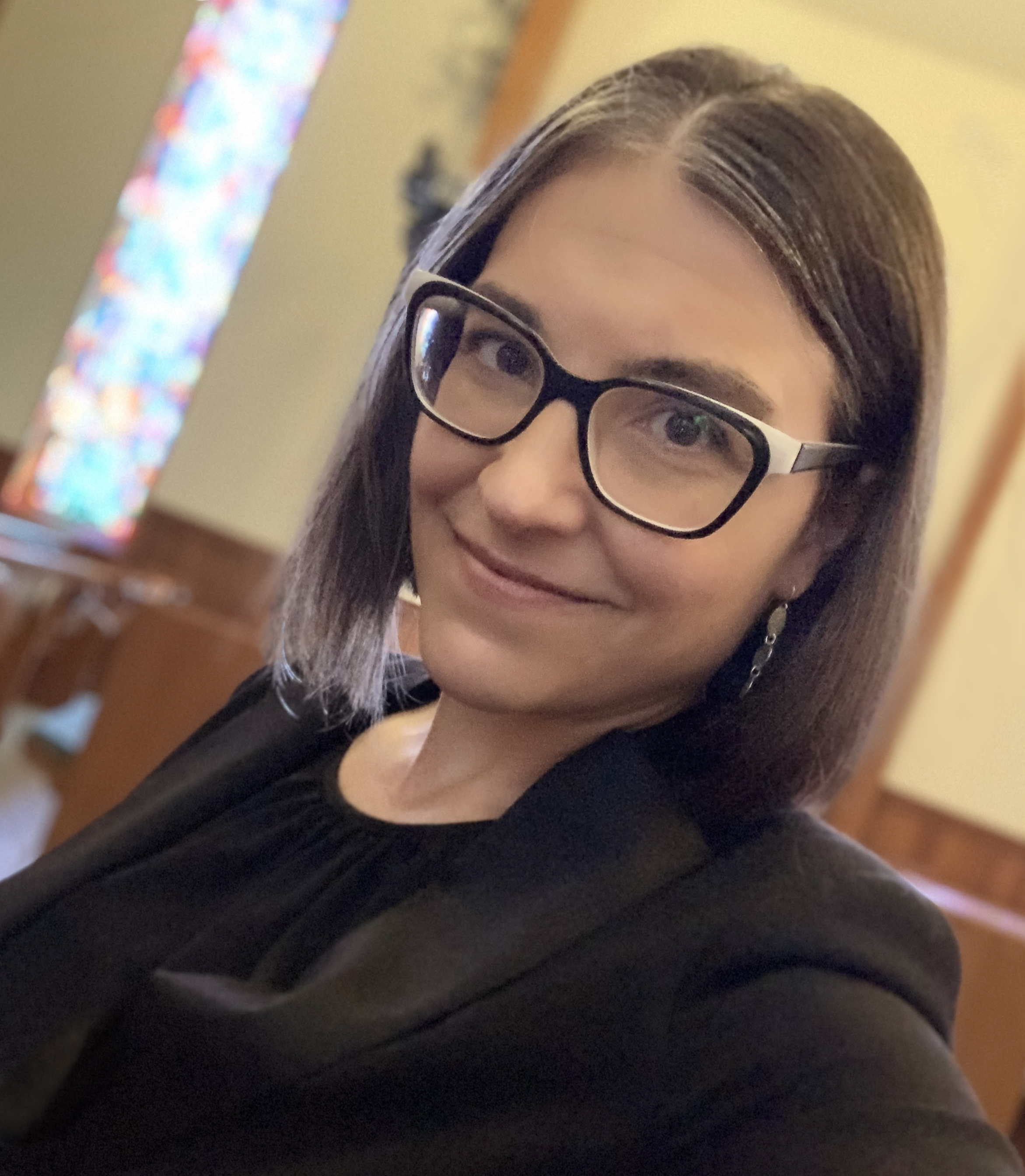

Background information
- Born: January 21, 1980 (age 46); Stevens Point, Wisconsin
- Occupation: Composer
- Years active: 2001 – present
- Website: abbiebetinis.com

Abbie Betinis (born January 21, 1980) is an American composer. She has composed music for a variety of musical ensembles, and is best known for her choral music and other vocal works.

== Early life and education ==
Born in Stevens Point, Wisconsin, Betinis began Suzuki piano and ear training at age 4 at the University of Wisconsin-Stevens Point's American Suzuki Talent Education Center (now Aber Suzuki Center). Valedictorian of her high school class, she enrolled in St. Olaf College on a piano scholarship, but during her sophomore year was diagnosed with Hodgkin's lymphoma and was forced to return home to begin chemotherapy. When she returned to St. Olaf, she changed course to pursue music composition and linguistics, graduating in 2001. She later earned a M.A. in music composition from the University of Minnesota, and studied harmony and counterpoint in the tradition of Nadia Boulanger at the European American Musical Alliance (EAMA) Summer Institute in Paris, France. Her teachers have included Mary Ellen Childs, Peter Hamlin, Philip Lasser, and Judith Lang Zaimont.

== Career ==
The music of Abbie Betinis has been described as "inventive [and] richly melodic" (The New York Times), "the highlight... bold...cathartic" (The Boston Globe), and as "intricate...with an inescapable allure." Her catalog of sixty commissioned works includes projects for the American Choral Directors Association, American Suzuki Foundation, Cantus, The Dale Warland Singers, James Sewell Ballet, The Rose Ensemble, The Schubert Club, Young New Yorkers' Chorus, and Zeitgeist.

Betinis chooses meaningful texts to set in a unique, yet accessible style. Her early residencies with The Rose Ensemble and The Singers—Minnesota Choral Artists (the latter for 10 years), helped to shape her sensibilities as a composer of vocal music and to explore and employ unconventional techniques, such as yodeling, spitting, whistling, glottal stops, and keening.

The music of Betinis is published by Augsburg Fortress, Fred Bock Music, Graphite Publishing, G. Schirmer, Kjos Music, Santa Barbara Music Publishing, and through her own venture, Abbie Betinis Music Co., which she founded in 2006 to publish and distribute her sheet music worldwide.

The grand niece of famed Christmas carol composer Alfred Burt, Abbie Burt Betinis is the third generation of the Burt family to compose and send an original carol to family and friends as part of her annual Christmas card. Each new Burt Family Carol has premiered on Minnesota Public Radio since she took up the tradition in 2001.

== Influences ==
Betinis is now a three-time cancer survivor, an experience she cites as an important influence in her work.

== Recognition ==
Betinis is a two-time McKnight Artist Fellow (2009, 2015), and has received grants and awards from the American Composers Forum, the Esoterics, Minnesota Music Educators Association, and New York's Sorel Organization, among others. Her song cycle Nattsanger (Nightsongs) for soprano, clarinet and piano won an Honorable Mention in the ASCAP Morton Gould Young Composer Awards. She and Dominick Argento are the two composers profiled in the award-winning 2009 Twin Cities Public Television documentary "Never Stop Singing," an examination of the choral music tradition in Minnesota.

== Personal life ==
Betinis lives in Saint Paul, Minnesota, where she is Composer-in-Residence at The Schubert Club, and Adjunct Professor of Composition at Concordia University.

== Discography ==
- "Bar xizam (Upward I Rise)" — Texas Music Educators Association (TMEA) 2014, University Of Texas At Arlington A Cappella Choir. Mark Records, 2014.
- "Cedit, Hyems (Be Gone, Winter!)" — Eternal Light, East Carolina University Chamber Singers. Gothic, 2010
- "Chant for Great Compassion" — No Whining, No Flowers, Cornell University Chorus, 2012.
- "Clan of the Lichens, The" — If this world could stop, Lindsay Kesselman, Christopher James Lees. Bad Wolff Music, 2014
- "From Behind the Caravan: Songs of Hâfez" — Inspirata, Ensemble Laude, 2011
- "In the Bleak Midwinter" — Candlelight Carols: Music for Chorus and Harp, Seraphic Fire. Seraphic Fire Media, 2014
- "Jerusalem Luminosa" — Transcendent Voices, Tucson Girls Chorus, 2012
- "Long Time Trav'ling" — At the River, The Singers - Minnesota Choral Artists, 2013
- "Nattsanger (Nightsongs) "— Bright Angel: American Works for Clarinet and Piano, Lindsay Kesselman, Midori Koga, Kimberly Cole Luevano. Fleur de Son Classics, 2013
- "Songs of Smaller Creatures" — Songs of Smaller Creatures and Other American Choral Works, Grant Park Chorus. Cedille, 2012
- "To the Evening Star" — Into the Night: Contemporary Choral Music, Vox Humana. Naxos, 2013
