= Liaisons: Re-Imagining Sondheim from the Piano =

Studio album by Anthony de Mare
- Released: September 25, 2015
- Recorded: 2010–2014
- Studios: American Academy of Arts and Letters; Greenfield Recital Hall, Manhattan School of Music
- Genre: Classical
- Length: 196:56
- Labels: ECM; ECM 2470–72
- Producer: Judy Sherman

Anthony de Mare chronology
Speak! The Speaking–Singing Pianist (2010)	Liaisons: Re-Imagining Sondheim from the Piano (2015)

Liaisons: Re-Imagining Sondheim from the Piano is a triple album performed by the pianist Anthony de Mare; ECM Records released the album in 2015. It consists of pieces inspired by the American musical theatre composer Stephen Sondheim's oeuvre and has works written by various classical, jazz, and other composers. The album consists of 37 tracks and is over three hours long. Composers who wrote pieces on the album include Jason Robert Brown, Michael Daugherty, Jake Heggie, Fred Hersch, Gabriel Kahane, Phil Kline, Ricardo Lorenz, Wynton Marsalis, Nico Muhly, Thomas Newman, Steve Reich, and Duncan Sheik. The album received mostly positive reviews.

== Conception and planning ==
Anthony De Mare hired Rachel Colbert to produce the project and began contacting Stephen Sondheim in 2007. De Mare initially planned on having between 20 and 25 works in the project but he eventually settled on inviting 36 composers. Each composer was able to "re-imagine" any Sondheim song they wished; de Mare requested that they kept the original melody and most of the harmonies, let them know they should be able to change the structure, and asked them to not deconstruct the song, although some did so.

Milton Babbitt, who had once taught Sondheim, had originally been chosen as one of the composers to participate in the project; his piece would have been inspired by "I'm Still Here" from Follies. His student, Frederic Rzewski replaced Babbitt upon his death in 2011. Adam Guettel was invited but declined due to feeling nervous; Elvis Costello, Sting, and Tori Amos had to decline participation due to a lack of time. Sondheim himself suggested de Mare invite Jason Robert Brown, Derek Bermel, and David Shire to compose pieces for the project. Of the thirty-six composers who contributed works, thirty-one were men and five were women. Thirty-two of them were born in the United States. The composers' ages ranged from late 20s to 80s.

Individuals and institutions commissioned each of the pieces from the various composers. The Clarice Smith Performing Arts Center commissioned Kenji Bunch's, Jake Heggie's, Frederic Rzewski's, and Bernadette Speach's pieces. The Schubert Club commissioned Mary Ellen Childs's piece and the Banff Centre commissioned Rodney Sharman's piece. Notable individuals who helped commission pieces include James S. Marcus, Beth Rudin DeWoody, and Benjamin M. Rosen. All works had been completed by 2014.

Twelve of Sondheim's musicals are represented by this album, chronologically spanning from A Funny Thing Happened on the Way to the Forum (1962) to Passion (1994). The Frogs and Bounce are notable musicals which Sondheim wrote the music for which are not represented. Over a third of the tracks are inspired by either Sunday in the Park with George or Sweeney Todd.

== Writing and production ==
The composers' backgrounds are in a variety of genres including classical, jazz, and rock, although the majority of the songs were written by contemporary classical composers. Most of the pieces are purely written for solo piano, although some pieces also featured a backing track or minor other metaphorical "bells 'n whistles". Duncan Sheik's "Johanna in Space" features a track made of several guitar improvisations layered through a tape echo. Jason Robert Brown's "Birds of Victorian England" and Steve Reich's "Finishing the Hat – 2 Pianos" are both written for multiple pianos. Certain songs like Andy Akiho's "Into the Woods", and Jherek Bischoff's "The Ballad of Guiteau", and Ricardo Lorenz's "The Worst (Empanadas) In London" feature a few words of spoken or sung dialogue. Bischoff's piece also features the slamming of a piano lid and creaking of the piano bench, and Michael Daugherty's "Everybody's Got The Right" features a shot from a prop gun. Akiho's piece was also written for a prepared piano, requiring screws and other objects to be placed in the piano strings to alter the sound.

The album was recorded between 2010 and 2014 at the American Academy of Arts and Letters and at Greenfield Recital Hall, Manhattan School of Music. The album's production was in part financed via an Indiegogo campaign.

== Reception ==
Professional ratings
Review scores
Source	Rating
All About Jazz	5/5 stars
BBC Music Magazine	4/5 stars
The Buffalo News	3.5/4 stars
Fono Forum	5/5 stars
The Guardian	4/5 stars
The New Zealand Herald	5/5 stars

Naomi Graber's review in the Journal of the Society for American Music called it "a fascinating contribution to American piano music". Jed Distler's review for Gramophone called it a "fascinating, excellently produced collection". Jesse Green called it an "astonishing" recording in New York; listening to the album was one of the magazine's entries in its "To Do" section. Joshua Kosman for the San Francisco Chronicle called the recording "indispensable" and "irresistible". Michael Feingold for The Village Voice praised de Mare's "ineffably precise playing" and referred to the compositions as "a treasure trove of approaches". Raymond Tuttle's album review in Fanfare said "most listeners probably will find something to love and something else to annoy them here" and criticized the "over-pedaled quality to many of these readings". Elliot Fisch's review in American Record Guide said de Mare performed all the songs "excellently", said the sound was "excellent", and that "this unique project deserves your attention".

Tom Huizenga named the album one of NPR's ten favorite classical albums of 2015. Anthony Tommasini also named it as one of the best classical music recordings of 2015 for The New York Times. Graham Rickson of The Arts Desk listed it as one of the best ten classical CDs of 2015, and called the album "superb", describing it as "magnificently recorded and beautifully produced". Anne Midgette for The Washington Post included it as one of her top five favorite classical recordings of 2015.

Stuart Derdeyn included Liaisons as one of "25 albums you may have missed but shouldn't have in 2015" in an article for The Province. Ted Gioia included Liaisons in a list of 20 "under-the-radar" albums of 2015 for The Daily Beast. Tom Huizenga included it as one of NPR's top 50 albums of 2015. Andre Dansby, for the Houston Chronicle, listed Liaisons as his 16th favorite album of 2015. The Guardian's jazz critic John Fordham also listed this album as one of his favorite albums of 2015.

Sondheim wrote in the liner notes, "Over the years I've heard songs of mine 'interpreted' by singers and piano-players and arrangers who change either the vocal lines or the harmonies or both, and much as my ego gets a lift when people sing my stuff, in every case I've winced. The pieces created for Liaisons are a different matter entirely; they're written by composers, not arrangers, and they aren't decorations of the songs. They're fantasias on them, responses to the melodic lines and the harmonies and occasionally the accompaniments. [...] It's fun (for me, anyway) to hear which of the song elements each composer latches on to, and how far they spin from them."

Judith Sherman won the Grammy Award for Producer of the Year, Classical at the 58th Annual Grammy Awards in part for her work on Liaisons.

== Tracks ==
The album consists of three discs and thirty-seven tracks. Information about the specific Sondheim pieces each work is inspired by comes from the sheet music.

Disc 1
No.	Title	Writer(s)	Length
1.	"A Little Night Fughetta" (after "Anyone Can Whistle" from Anyone Can Whistle and "Send in the Clowns" from A Little Night Music)	William Bolcom	1:41
2.	"Color And Light" (after "Color and Light" from Sunday in the Park with George)	Nico Muhly	5:36
3.	"Finishing the Hat – 2 Pianos" (after "Finishing the Hat" from Sunday in the Park with George)	Steve Reich	3:20
4.	"The Ladies Who Lunch" (after "The Ladies Who Lunch" from Company)	David Rakowski	7:19
5.	"Perpetual Happiness" (after "Happiness" from Passion)	Eve Beglarian	6:01
6.	"Birds Of Victorian England" (after "Green Finch and Linnet Bird" from Sweeney Todd)	Jason Robert Brown	3:04
7.	"Johanna in Space" (after "Johanna" from Sweeney Todd)	Duncan Sheik	5:56
8.	"You Could Drive A Person Crazy" (after "You Could Drive A Person Crazy" from Company)	Eric Rockwell	3:01
9.	"That Old Piano Roll" (after "That Old Piano Roll" from Follies)	Wynton Marsalis	4:38
10.	"Sorry/Grateful" (after "Sorry–Grateful" from Company)	Derek Bermel	6:59
11.	"No One Is Alone" (after "No One Is Alone" from Into the Woods)	Fred Hersch	4:03
12.	"A Bowler Hat" (after "A Bowler Hat" from Pacific Overtures)	Annie Gosfield	5:17
13.	"I'm Excited. No You're Not." (after "A Weekend in the Country" from A Little Night Music)	Jake Heggie	5:15
Total length:			62:10

Disc 2
No.	Title	Writer(s)	Length
1.	"The Demon Barber" (after "The Ballad of Sweeney Todd" from Sweeney Todd)	Kenji Bunch	5:07
2.	"Send in the Clowns" (after "Send in the Clowns" from A Little Night Music)	Ethan Iverson	5:49
3.	"The Worst (Empanadas) in London" (after "The Worst Pies in London" and "A Little Priest" from Sweeney Todd)	Ricardo Lorenz	4:53
4.	"I Think About You" (after "Losing My Mind" from Follies)	Paul Moravec	9:00
5.	"Very Put Together" (after "Putting it Together" from Sunday in the Park with George)	Mason Bates	3:08
6.	"I'm Still Here" (after "I'm Still Here" from Follies)	Frederic Rzewski	6:43
7.	"Love is in the Air" (after "Love is in the Air" from A Funny Thing Happened on the Way to the Forum)	David Shire	4:05
8.	"Epiphany" (after music from Sweeney Todd)	John Musto	5:05
9.	"Pretty Women" (after "Pretty Women" from Sweeney Todd)	Mark-Anthony Turnage	3:44
10.	"Paraphrase "Someone in a Tree"" (after "Someone in a Tree" from Pacific Overtures)	Phil Kline	5:42
11.	"In and Out of Love" (after "Liaisons" and "Send in the Clowns" from A Little Night Music)	Bernadette Speach	5:59
12.	"Another Hundred People" (after "Another Hundred People" from Company)	Daniel Bernard Roumain	7:17
Total length:			66:32

Disc 3
No.	Title	Writer(s)	Length
1.	"Into the Woods" (after Act I Opening from Into the Woods)	Andy Akiho	8:57
2.	"Every Day a Little Death" (after "Every Day a Little Death" from A Little Night Music)	Ricky Ian Gordon	5:18
3.	"Merrily We Roll Along" (after "Merrily We Roll Along" and "The Hills of Tomorrow" from Merrily We Roll Along)	Nils Vigeland	5:39
4.	"Notes on "Beautiful"" (after "Beautiful" from Sunday in the Park with George)	Rodney Sharman	5:27
5.	"Being Alive" (after "Being Alive" from Company)	Gabriel Kahane	4:45
6.	"Not While I'm Around" (after "Not While I'm Around" from Sweeney Todd)	Thomas Newman	2:55
7.	"The Ballad of Guiteau" (after "The Ballad of Guiteau" from Assassins)	Jherek Bischoff	5:53
8.	"Now" (after "Now", "Later", and "Soon" from A Little Night Music)	Mary Ellen Childs	3:22
9.	"A Child of Children and Art" (after "Children and Art" from Sunday in the Park with George)	Peter Golub	8:24
10.	"going ... gone" (after "Good Thing Going" from Merrily We Roll Along)	Tania León	7:38
11.	"Everybody's Got the Right" (after "Everybody's Got the Right" from Assassins)	Michael Daugherty	4:36
12.	"Sunday in the Park – Passages" (after music from Sunday in the Park with George)	Anthony de Mare	5:20
Total length:			68:14

== Personnel ==
Credits are adapted from the liner notes.

- Rachel Colbert – Producer for The Liaisons Project
- Judy Sherman – Recording producer and engineer
- Jeanne Velonis – Additional engineer and editing assistant
- Kevin Boutote – Engineer for backing tracks for "Birds of Victorian England"
- Duncan Sheik – Provider for backing track for "Johanna In Space"
- Christoph Stickel – Mastering
- Steve Lake – Mastering
- Paolo Soriani – Liner photos
- Fred R. Conrad – Liner photos
- Jerry Jackson – Liner photos
- Bernd Kuchenbeiser – Design

== Charts ==
Liaisons was on Billboard's Top Classical Albums chart for four weeks, with a peak position of 15 the week of October 24, 2015. It also spent four weeks on Billboard's Top Classical Crossover Albums peaking at 11 the week of October 17, 2015.

Chart	Peak position
US Top Classical Albums (Billboard)	15
US Top Classical Crossover Albums (Billboard)	11

== Sequel ==
Professional ratings
Review scores
Source	Rating
BBC Music Magazine	4/5 stars

A sequel album, Liaisons II: All Things Bright and Beautiful – Re-Imagining Sondheim from the Piano was released in 2025 by Avie Records. Tuttle's review for Fanfare concluded, "If you appreciate Sondheim's legacy, or if you respond positively to at least a few of the composers' names [...], then this release might be for you." Fisch's review in American Record Guide "The arrangers seem more interested in hearing their arrangements than in the actual song", calling it "a trial for the listener".
