= Bernadette Speach =

American composer

Bernadette Speach (born January 1, 1948) is an American avant-garde composer and pianist. Known for her minimalist approach, she often synthesizes improvisation and through-composed material.

== Biography ==
Born in Syracuse, New York, Speach earned her B.S. in Music Education from the College of Saint Rose in 1971. Five years later, while studying abroad in Siena, Italy, she was introduced to Franco Donatoni and Morton Feldman. She went on to study with Feldman, alongside composers Lejaren Hiller and Leo Smit, at SUNY Buffalo, where she finished her M.A. and Ph.D. in Music Composition, and before that studied under Jacques Louis Monod and Nicolas Rousakis at Columbia University.

Although trained in the classical idiom, Speach is equally rooted in jazz, and in the latter vein includes room for aleatory elements in her compositions, ranging from solo and chamber to orchestral and vocal/choral works. An example is her second string quartet, les ondes pour quatre (1988), which blends fixed and free durations. Notable performers of her work include the Brooklyn Philharmonic Orchestra under Lukas Foss, the Absolute Chamber Orchestra under Kristjan Järvi, pianist Ursula Oppens, saxophonist Oliver Lake, Duo Avanzando, pianist Anthony de Mare, the Soldier String Quartet, soprano Joan LaBarbara, Arditti String Quartet, and cellist Frances-Marie Uitti. Her music has been programmed in such venues as Roulette Intermedium (NYC), Festival International de Musica (São Paulo, Brazil), the Ravinia Festival (Highland Park, IL), Merkin Hall (NYC), Walker Art Center (Minneapolis, MN), the Internationales Musikinstitut (Darmstadt, Germany), and the Knitting Factory (NYC).

Her large-scale work Embrace the Universe (2001), for orchestra, mixed chorus, soprano, viola and piano was premiered May 9, 2016 at Teatro Petruzzelli in Bari, Italy. In 2010, she was commissioned by the Clarice Smith Performing Arts Center to compose a piece as part of pianist Anthony de Mare’s “Liaisons: Re-imagining Sondheim from the Piano.” The result was In and Out of Love and received its premiere at the Clarice Smith Performing Arts Center in 2011. Inspired by “Liaisons” and “Send in the Clowns” from Stephen Sondheim’s A Little Night Music, In and Out of Love was released September 2015 as part of a 3-CD set of the entire “Liaisons” project recorded by de Mare for the ECM label to critical acclaim. Its producer, Judith Sherman, received a Grammy Award for Classical Producer of the Year.

Other commissions have come from percussionist Ricardo Souza (Only/Solimente for solo vibraphone, 2004), soprano Lauralyn Kolb (Set of Three for soprano and piano, 2005), the National Endowment for the Arts 1992 (Parallel Windows – Unframed for piano and orchestra, 1996), the Minnesota Composers Forum 1992 (Avanzando for bass clarinet, piano, marimba, vibraphone and glockenspiel, 1993), iEAR Studios/Department of the Arts/Rensselaer Polytechnic Institute 1989 (9/8/89 for digital sampler and tape, 1990), the Manhattan Neighborhood Network/The Kitchen Video Workshop, 1995-96 (Angels in the Snow, a film/video documentary with solo piano), and the New York State Council on the Arts, 1992 (Baobab 4 for flute, clarinet, alto saxophone, trombone, acoustic and electric guitar, bass, two pianos, balafon, reciter, three women’s voices and dancer, 1994).

Speach has been composer-in-residence at the Brooklyn College Electroacoustic Studio (2002), received a fellowship from the New York Foundation for the Arts (1998–99), and received grants and awards from Arts Midwest (1993), Margaret Fairbank Jory Copying Assistance Program (1989 & 1997), and Meet the Composer (1985-2001). She is also a seasoned improviser—sharing performances with her husband, guitarist/composer Jeffrey Schanzer and poet Thulani Davis, among others—and as pianist is regarded for her interpretations of the keyboard repertoire of John Cage, including In a landscape and his pieces for toy piano.

Speach is a lifelong teacher and arts administrator. Before her current post at SUNY Adirondack, she held positions at Darmstadt (1988), The New School (1994–98), SUNY Purchase (2005), the College of Saint Rose (2009–14), and Brooklyn College (2001–08, 2012–13), and has been a guest lecturer at many others besides. She has also served as panelist and advisor for a large number of organizations, including Colorado Council on the Arts, Jerome Foundation, Mary Flagler Cary Charitable Trust, New Music America Festivals, NYC Department of Cultural Affairs, and the New York State Council on the Arts. She also served as executive director for The Kitchen (1996–98) and Composers’ Forum, Inc. (1986-1990) in New York City. She continues to vitalize the northeastern United States music scene through her multiple roles as fundraiser, presenter, and educator, seeking new relationships between sounds and their interpreters.

== Works ==
Pillars (2017)

for piano, electric guitar and saxophone
April 29, 2017, Tannery Pond Center at Tannery Pond Community Center, North Creek, NY.
Performed by Bernadette Speach (piano), Jeffrey Schanzer (electric guitar) and Oliver Lake (saxophone)

altrove/elsewhere (2012)

for piano/toy piano and violin
February 4, 2012, Music of Now Marathon, Symphony Space, NYC.
Performed by Bernadette Speach (piano/toy piano) and Madalyn Parnas (violin)

after sunrise (2011)

for percussion and clarinets
October 24, 2012, University of Arkansas, Fort Worth.
Performed by Duo Avanzando: Ricardo Souza (percussion) and David Carter (clarinets)

In and Out of Love (2010)

after “Liaisons” and “Send in the Clowns” (A Little Night Music) by Stephen Sondheim.
Commissioned by Clarice Smith Performing Arts Center
April 2, 2011, Clarice Smith Performing Arts Center/UMD School of Music.
Performed by Anthony de Mare (piano)
Recording: ECM New Series. Liaisons: Re-imagining Sondheim from the Piano. Grammy Award - Judith Sherman, Classical Producer of the Year.

TreeSing (2007)

for bass clarinet, marimba and piano with video processing
May 24, 2007, Roulette, New York, NY.
Performed by Margot Leverett, Bass Clarinet, Gustavo Aguilar - Marimba, Bernadette Speach - Piano, Anney Bonney - Video

A Set of Three (2005)

for soprano and piano
Texts by e.e. cummings
February 24, 2007, Hamilton College, Clinton, NY.
Performed & Commissioned by Lauralyn Kolb - Soprano, Tina Toglia - Piano

Only/Solimente (2003/04)

for solo Vibraphone
Commissioned by Ricardo Souza
June 6, 2005, Festival International de Musica, Sao Paulo, Brazil.
Performed by Ricardo Souza - Vibraphone

Embrace the Universe (2001)

for orchestra, chorus (SATB) and soloists (mezzo-soprano, viola, piano)
Text: “Hymn to Matter” from The Divine Milieu by Pierre Teilhard de Chardin
May 9, 2016, Teatro Petruzzelli, Bari, Italy.
Performed by Orchestra Sinfonica del Conservatorio “Niccolo Piccinni” (director: Giovanni Pelliccia), Ensemble vocale “Forilegium Vocis” (director: Sabino Manzo), Anastasia Abryutina (mezzo-soprano), Paolo Messa (viola) and Emanuele Arciuli (piano)

Viola (1999)

for viola and piano
April 29, 2000, Roulette, New York, NY.
Performed by Rozanna Weinberger (viola) and Anthony de Mare (piano)
Recording: Mode Records

Anne (1998)

for two sopranos, baritone, string quartet and clarinet
February 19, 1998, Merkin Concert Hall, New York, NY.
Performed by Joan LaBarbara (soprano), Cheryl Marshall (soprano), Thomas Meglioranza (baritone), J.D. Parran (clarinet) and the Soldier String Quartet

Parallel Windows – Unframed (1996)

for piano and orchestra
National Endowment for the Arts Composers’ Fellowship (1992)
March 20, 1997, The Kitchen, New York, NY.
Performed by Absolute Chamber Orchestra conducted by Kristjan Järvi with Anthony de Mare (piano)

When It Rains, Llueve (1995)

for piano
February 1, 1996, Merkin Concert Hall, New York, NY.
Written for and performed by Anthony de Mare (piano)
Recording: Mode Records
Publisher: Kallisti Music Press

Angels in the Snow (1993)

for piano solo
December 9, 1993, Real Music Series, CBGB’s Galleria, New York, NY.
Performed by Bernadette Speach (piano)
Recording: Mode Records

Avanzando (1993)

for bass clarinet, piano, marimba, vibraphone and glockenspiel.
Underwritten by the American Composers Forum with funds provided by the Jerome Foundation
November 4, 1993, Walker Art Center, Minneapolis, Minnesota.
Commissioned and performed by Zeitgeist

Chosen Voices (1991)

for toy piano and prepared guitar
June 8, 1991, MusicVistas, Inc., The Parlour, Brooklyn, NY.
Performed by Schanzer/Speach Duo
Recording: Mode Records

9/8/89 (1990)

for digital sampler and tape
March 27, 1990, RPI - iEAR Studios, Troy Music Hall, Troy, NY.
Performed by Bernadette Speach

Within (1990)

for piano and orchestra
February 15, 1990, Cooper Union, New York, NY.
Brooklyn Philharmonic Orchestra “Meet the Moderns,” conducted by Lukas Foss with Ursula Oppens (piano)

les ondes pour quatre (1988)

for string quartet
August 7, 1988, Internationales Musikinstitut, Darmstadt, Germany.
Performed by Arditti String Quartet
Recording: Mode Records
Publisher: Kallisti Music Press

Shattered Glass (1986)

for percussion solo
October 17, 1986, Experimental Intermedia Foundation, New York, NY.
Performed by Bobby Previte
Recorded by Michael Pugliese on Mode Records

== Poetry/music collaborations with Thulani Davis ==
Meditations: Abandon All Hope of Fruition (2004)

for reciter and piano
April 21, 2004, Pen and Brush, New York, NY.
Performed by Thulani Davis (reciter) and Bernadette Speach (piano)

Meditations: Kundun and The Womb of Buddha (2002)

for reciter and piano
May 16, 18 & 19, 2002, The Performing Garage, New York, NY.
Performed by Thulani Davis (reciter) and Bernadette Speach (piano)

Meditations: Upriver Sea Islands from The Translator and Womb of Buddha (2001)

for reciter and ensemble
May 27, 2001, PICA (Portland Institute of Contemporary Art), Portland, Oregon.
Performed by Thulani Davis (reciter), Lyndee Mah (voice), Bernadette Speach (piano), Jeffrey Schanzer (guitar) and Skip Elliot Bowman (bass)

Passages and Outtakes (2000)

for chamber ensemble
April 29, 2000, Roulette, New York, NY.
Performed by Thulani Davis (reciter), Alva Rogers (voice and Percussion), Jeffrey Schanzer (guitar) and Bernadette Speach (piano)

Woman Without Adornment (1995)

for chamber ensemble
Settings from the Novel 1959 by Thulani Davis
March 29, 1995, The Kitchen, NYC.
Performed by Alva Rogers (mezzo Soprano), Thulani Davis (reciter), Bernadette Speach (piano), Jeffrey Schanzer (guitars) and Pablo Aslan (bass)
Recording: Mode Records

Baobab 4 (1994)

for flute, clarinet, alto saxophone, trombone, acoustic and electric guitar, bass, two pianos, balafon, reciter, three women’s voices and dancer.
Commissioned by MusicVistas, Inc. with funds provided by the New York State Council on the Arts
April 9, 1994, MusicVistas and P.S. 122, New York, NY.
Performed by Rob DeBellis (reeds), Jeff Hoyer (trombone), Jeffrey Schanzer (guitars), Lindsey Horner (bass), Myra Melford (piano), Thulani Davis (poet/reciter), Michelle Kinney (voice), Alva Rogers (voice), Dawn Saito (voice), Bernadette Speach (conductor, piano II, balafon) and Ron Brown (dancer)

Telepathy Suite (1986–87)

for chamber ensemble
March 8, 1987, Celebrate Brooklyn Festival, Prospect Park Picnic House, Brooklyn, NY.
Performed by Thulani Davis (reciter), Oliver Lake (alto saxophone), Jeff Hoyer (trombone), Myra Melford (piano), Jeffrey Schanzer (guitar), Lindsey Horner (bass), and Bernadette Speach (piano and conductor)
Recording: Mode Records

== Improvisations for Piano and Guitar ==
Debabelized Brook (2004)

April 4, 2004, Flea Theater, New York, NY, with video by Anney Bonney.

Hell’s Gate (2004)

April 4, 2004, Flea Theater, New York, NY, with video by Anney Bonney.

Toy Rings (2002)

in collaboration with John J.A. Jannone (electronics)
February 8, 2002, Brooklyn Society for Ethical Culture, Brooklyn, NY.

Glove Quartet (2002)

in collaboration with Holland Hopson (saxophone and electronics) and John J.A.Jannone (electronics)
February 8, 2002, Brooklyn Society for Ethical Culture, Brooklyn, NY.

Lago (1999)

December 9, 1999, Greenwich House Music School, New York, NY.

Outside In (1996)

June 1, 1996, Lafayette Avenue Presbyterian Church, Brooklyn, NY.

at the same time (1993)

February 14, 1993, Music Designs, New York, NY.

Sound Crowds (1990)

November 24, 1990, Cirque Divers, Liège, Belgium.

It’s Your Turn (1990)

November 24, 1990, Cirque Divers, Liège, Belgium.
Recording: Mode/Avant

3-1/2 (1990)

September 15, 1990, MusicVistas, Inc., Roulette, New York, NY.
Recording: Mode/Avant

Blue (1989)

February 9, 1990, Real Art Ways, Hartford, CT.
Recording: Mode/Avant

Phill’s Phault (1988)

July 31, 1988, Logos Foundation, Ghent, Belgium.

Two in the Morning (1986)

October 17, 1986, Experimental Intermedia Foundation, New York, NY.
Recording: Mode/Avant

== Recordings ==
Liaisons: Re-imagining Sondheim from the Piano (ECM 2470-72, 2015)

Anthony de Mare

Reflections (Mode 105, 2002)

Bernadette Speach
Chamber Works

Dualities (Mode/Avant 02, 1992)

Schanzer/Speach Duo
Improvised Duets, Solos

Without Borders (Mode 16, 1989)

Bernadette Speach
Chamber Works
