= Teta =

Teta may refer to:

== Films ==
- Teta (film), an American short film
- La Teta y la Luna, a Spanish/French film
- La Teta Asustada, a Peruvian film

== Other ==
- TETA, abbreviation for Triethylenetetramine, an organic compound
- 15374 Teta, an asteroid
- Teta Lando, an Angolan musician
- Teta Hyral, a character in Final Fantasy Tactics video game
- Empress Teta, an Old Republic character in the Star Wars universe
- Mikel Arteta, Spanish football manager, sometimes nicknamed 'Teta'
- Teta (Czech mythology), a mythical female magician of 8th century Czech mythology, the sister of Libuše

== See also ==
- Tetas (disambiguation)
