= No One Is Alone =

No One Is Alone may refer to:

- "No One Is Alone" (Desperate Housewives), an episode of Desperate Housewives
- "No One Is Alone" (song), from the Stephen Sondheim musical Into the Woods
- No One Is Alone, a 2006 album by Glenn Yarbrough
- No One Is Alone, a 2007 album by Barbara Cook
- No One Is Alone, a 1996 album by Laurie Beechman
