= The Battalion Drum and Bugle Corps =

Drum and bugle corps in Salt Lake City, U.S.

- Location: Salt Lake City, Utah, U.S.
- Division: DCI Open Class
- Founded: 2014
- Director: Tyler Hess
- Website: battalioncorps.org

The Battalion Drum and Bugle Corps is a junior drum and bugle corps based in Salt Lake City, Utah. The ensemble competes in the Open Class division of Drum Corps International (DCI). Beginning in 2027 they will be competing in the World Class division.

The corps participates in national tours during the summer season, performing at competitions and events across the United States.

== History ==
Established in 2014 in Salt Lake City, The Battalion Drum and Bugle Corps was formed to provide a local option for youth pageantry arts in Utah, utilizing a unique touring schedule that accommodates religious services. The organization launched its inaugural competitive season in 2016, embarking on regional tours before expanding to national competitions. In 2022, the corps made history as the first-ever drum corps from Utah to compete at the Drum Corps International World Championships, finishing in seventh place in the Open Class finals. The corps advanced to the DCI World Championship Semifinals for the first time in 2024, ultimately earning its first Open Class bronze medal in 2025.

In June 2025, the corps' regional expansion and training operations were highlighted in a dedicated broadcast profile by KSL TV, which documented the launch of their national tour concluding at the DCI World Championships. The news segment detailed the corps' rigorous daily preparation facilities in Ogden and its capacity to attract elite student performers from across the country to Utah's pageantry arts circuit.

== Show summary (2016–2026) ==
Key
Light blue background indicates DCI Open Class Finalist
Pale green background indicates DCI World Class Semifinalist

| Year | Repertoire | World Championships | |
| Year | Repertoire | Score | Placement |
|---|---|---|---|
| 2016 | Run to You! Run To You by Pentatonix & Ben Bram / to wALk Or ruN in wEst harlem by Andy Akiho / Meetings Along the Edge by Ravi Shankar & Philip Glass / Wayfaring Stranger (Traditional) | Did not attend World Championships | |
| 2017 | Listen to the Silence; Original Music by Alexander Entin, John Matthews & Shilo Stroman | Did not attend World Championships | |
| 2018 | Seeing Red; Music by Anton Bruckner, Eric Satie & Ludwig van Beethoven / Original Music by Alexander Entin, John Matthews & Shilo Stroman | Did not attend World Championships | |
| 2019 | Humanity; Shenandoah (Traditional) / Many Languages, One World by Alexander Entin, John Matthews & Shilo Stroman / Sunken Cathedral by Claude Debussy / Symphony No. 4, Mvt. 4 by Pyotr Ilyich Tchaikosvky / Original Music by Alexander Entin, John Matthews & Shilo Stroman | Did not attend World Championships | |
| 2020 | Season canceled due to the COVID-19 pandemic | | |
| 2021 | Onward; Repertoire unavailable | No scored competitions | |
| 2022 | eXpand; Also Sprach Zarathustra by Richard Strauss / Infinite Wisdom by Shilo Stroman, John A. Matthews II, Alexander Entin & Neal Titus / I'm Always Chasing Rainbows, Beyond the Surface & Frequency Postlude by Harry Carroll & Joseph McCarthy | 75.600 | 7th Place; Open Class; Finalist |
| 2022 | eXpand; Also Sprach Zarathustra by Richard Strauss / Infinite Wisdom by Shilo Stroman, John A. Matthews II, Alexander Entin & Neal Titus / I'm Always Chasing Rainbows, Beyond the Surface & Frequency Postlude by Harry Carroll & Joseph McCarthy | 73.163 | 27th Place; World Class |
| 2023 | In Our Element; Unstoppable by Sia Furler & Christopher Braide / Ouroboros by Zoran Rosendahl / Hypercube by Oliver Waespi | 75.475 | 5th Place; Open Class; Finalist |
| 2023 | In Our Element; Unstoppable by Sia Furler & Christopher Braide / Ouroboros by Zoran Rosendahl / Hypercube by Oliver Waespi | 74.725 | 26th Place; World Class |
| 2024 | Dead Reckoning; Malagueña by Ernesto Lecuona / Spanish Fantasy by Chick Corea / My Spanish Heart by Chick Corea | 79.188 | 4th Place; Open Class; Finalist |
| 2024 | Dead Reckoning; Malagueña by Ernesto Lecuona / Spanish Fantasy by Chick Corea / My Spanish Heart by Chick Corea | 74.425 | 24th Place; World Class; Semifinalist |
| 2025 | Foretold the Ravens; Commencement by Johnny Richards / The Rite of Spring by Igor Stravinsky / Artemis and Apollo by Johnny Richards / Aspect by Johnny Richards | 79.750 | 3rd Place; Open Class; Finalist |
| 2025 | Foretold the Ravens; Commencement by Johnny Richards / The Rite of Spring by Igor Stravinsky / Artemis and Apollo by Johnny Richards / Aspect by Johnny Richards | 79.125 | 21st Place; World Class; Semifinalist |
| 2026 | In Search Of; First Essay for Orchestra by Samuel Barber / On the Waterfront by Leonard Bernstein / Symphony No. 1, Op. 9: III. Andante tranquillo by Samuel Barber / Music for Strings, Percussion and Celeste by Béla Bartók | 81.500 | 2nd Place; Open Class; Finalist |
| 2026 | In Search Of; First Essay for Orchestra by Samuel Barber / On the Waterfront by Leonard Bernstein / Symphony No. 1, Op. 9: III. Andante tranquillo by Samuel Barber / Music for Strings, Percussion and Celeste by Béla Bartók | 79.225 | 20th Place; World Class; Semifinalist |
