= Rose Ensemble =

American musical group

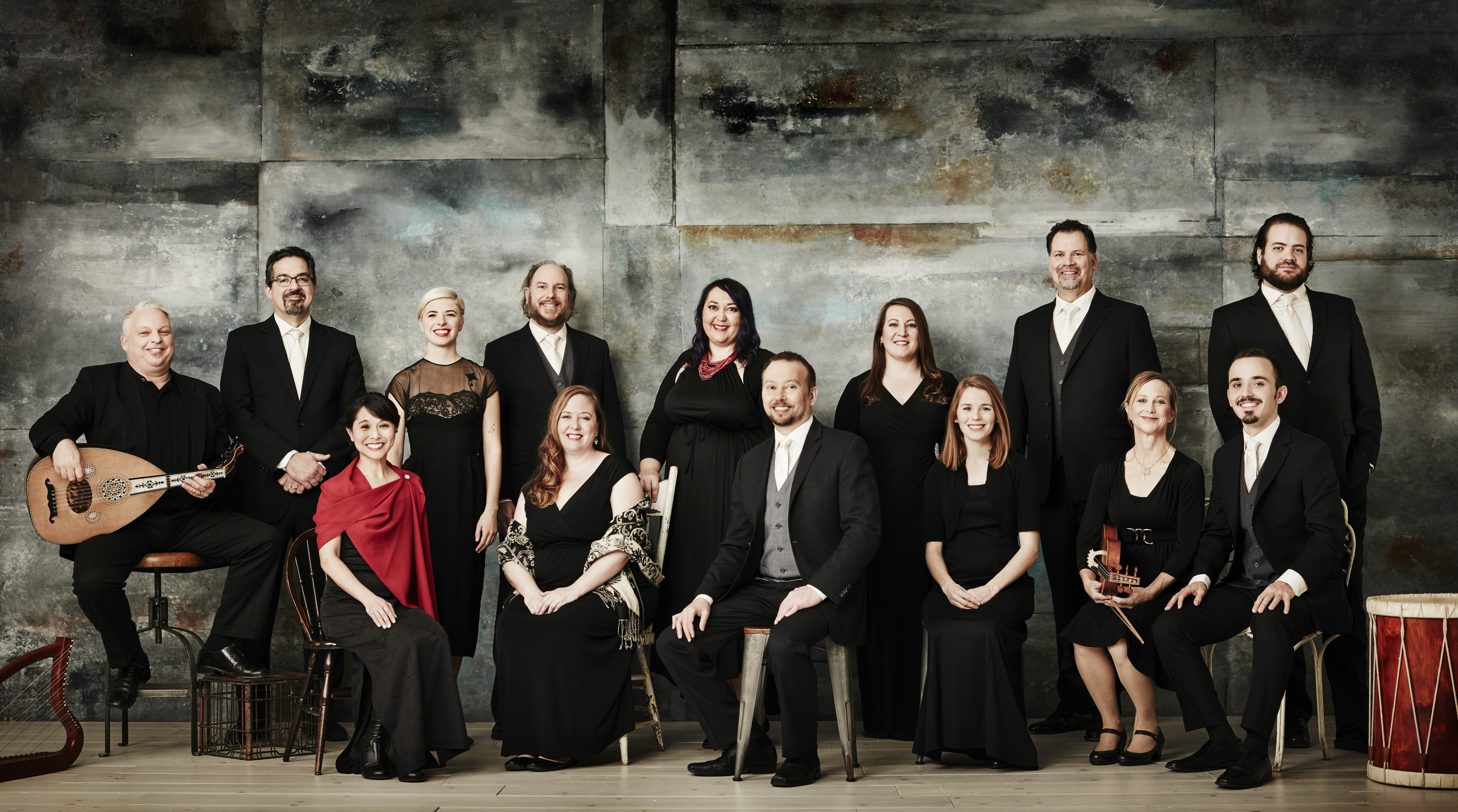
The Rose Ensemble

The Rose Ensemble is an early-music group based in St. Paul, Minnesota, and founded in 1996 by Artistic Director Jordan Sramek.

The Rose Ensemble has appeared on American Public Media and the European Broadcasting Union (most notably with annual holiday broadcasts) and has performed extensively throughout the Americas and Europe.

== Past Touring Programs ==
- Il Poverello: The Life and Legacy of St. Francis of Assisi
- Christmas in Baroque Malta: Italian Majesty at Mdina Cathedral
- Land of Three Faiths: Voices of Ancient Mediterranean Jews, Christians, and Muslims
- The Last Queen of Hawai'i: Music from the Soul of the Hawaiian Saga
- American Roots: Harmonies that Shaped a Nation
- A Renaissance Requiem: Tomas-Luis de Victoria's Mass for the Departed
- Slavic Wonders: Feasts and Saints in Early Russia, Bohemia, Poland and Ukraine

== Collaborations ==
With Voces8:

- Renaissance Music for Two Choirs (2009)
- Voices of Venice & Rome: The Glory of Italian Renaissance Choral Music (2010)
- The Miraculous Mass of Mary: North American Premiere of a Renaissance Masterpiece (2012)

With Piffaro, The Renaissance Band:

- Spain in the New World: Song and Dance in Early Mexico, Guatemala, Bolivia, and Peru (2012)
- Welcome the People: The Musical Legacy of the Reformation (2017)

With the Minnesota Orchestra:

- Navidad en Cuba: Christmas in Havana Cathedral (2014)

With the Dark Horse Consort:

- The Requiem of Pedro de Escobar: As it might have been performed at Seville Cathedral, for the funeral of Prince Juan (1478–1497) (2015)
- Empire, Religion, War, Peace: Music from Europe's 30-Year Conflict, 1618–1648 (2018)

== Commissions ==
From its founding, The Rose Ensemble performed numerous works commissioned for or by them. These have included works by Carol E. Barnett, Eric Barnum, William Beckstrand, Abbie Betinis, Edie Hill, Linda Kachelmeier, Michael Karmon, Sergey Khvoshchinsky, J. David Moore, Stephen Paulus, John Rommereim, Timothy Takach, and Victor Zupanc.

== Educational Programs and Outreach ==
The Rose Ensemble provided educational programming for students in elementary, middle school, high school, and university settings, as well as outreach programs in public libraries, senior homes, and various community organizations.

For high school and college students, Sramek and ensemble members provided a wide range of clinics, masterclasses, lectures, and interactive discussions, as well as opportunities for integrated rehearsals and performances with Ensemble musicians.

Public library programs highlighted the research of concert programs, demonstrations of historical instruments, and cultural context within musical traditions.

The Senior Community Outreach program featured a variety of early-American music, and as designed to maximize comfort of and participation by seniors of all abilities.

== Awards and achievements ==
- Recipient of a Rockefeller Arts & Religion in the Twin Cities Award
- 2005 Chorus America's Margaret Hillis Award for Choral Excellence
- First-place winner in the sacred music category at the 2007 Tolosa International Choral Competition (Spain)
- First-place winner in BOTH the sacred and secular music categories at the 2012 Tolosa International Choral Competition
- 2018 Early Music America's Laurette Goldberg Award for Lifetime Achievement in Early Music Outreach

== Recordings ==
- Seasons of Angels: Harmony of the Spheres
- Slavic Holiday: Legends from Ancient Czechoslovakia and Poland
- The Road to Compostela
- Fire of the Soul: Choral Virtuosity in 17th-Century Russia and Poland
- Celebremos El Nino: Christmas Delights from the Mexican Baroque
- Rosa Das Rosas: Cantigas de Santa Maria & Other Spiritual Songs for the Virgin
- Nā Mele Hawaiʻi: A Rediscovery of Hawaiian Vocal Music. Featured in the HBO limited series, The White Lotus, and Disney's live-action Lilo & Stitch.
- And Glory Shone Around: Early American Carols, Country Dances, Southern Harmony Hymns, and Shaker Spiritual Songs
- Il Poverello: Medieval & Renaissance Music for Saint Francis of Assisi
- A Toast to Prohibition: All-American Songs of Temperance and Temptation
- Treasures from Baroque Malta
