= Utah Chamber Artists =

American choir and orchestra

- Chamber orchestra and choir
- Founded: 1991
- Location: Salt Lake City
- Principal conductor: Barlow Bradford
- Website: www.utahchamberartists.org

The Utah Chamber Artists is a choir and orchestra based in Salt Lake City, Utah, was established in 1991 by Music Director Barlow Bradford. The ensemble consists of forty singers and forty players.

The choir performed on the National Public Radio program "First Art," appeared on the Mormon Tabernacle Choir's weekly broadcast, performed with Keith Lockhart and the Boston Pops Esplanade Orchestra, and sung on various occasions with the Utah Symphony. Dale Warland and Paul Salamunovich have also been guest conductors during the ensemble's regular concert series. In 1996, the choir was invited to perform with the Israel Chamber Orchestra. Dr. Bradford conducted the ensembles in a concert tour of Israel which culminated in a studio recording of the John Rutter "Requiem."

Utah Chamber Artists orchestra and choir have recorded several compact discs. Their first, "Welcome All Wonders; A Christmas Celebration," was awarded an "Indie" from National Association of Independent Record Distributors & Manufacturers. Utah Chamber Artists have recorded a second Christmas CD, "Joyous Day," which includes Barlow Bradford's arrangements of carols.

The choir and orchestra offer a concert season in Salt Lake City in addition to touring and recording performing a variety of music.
