= Alexandra Hidalgo =

Venezuelan-American director

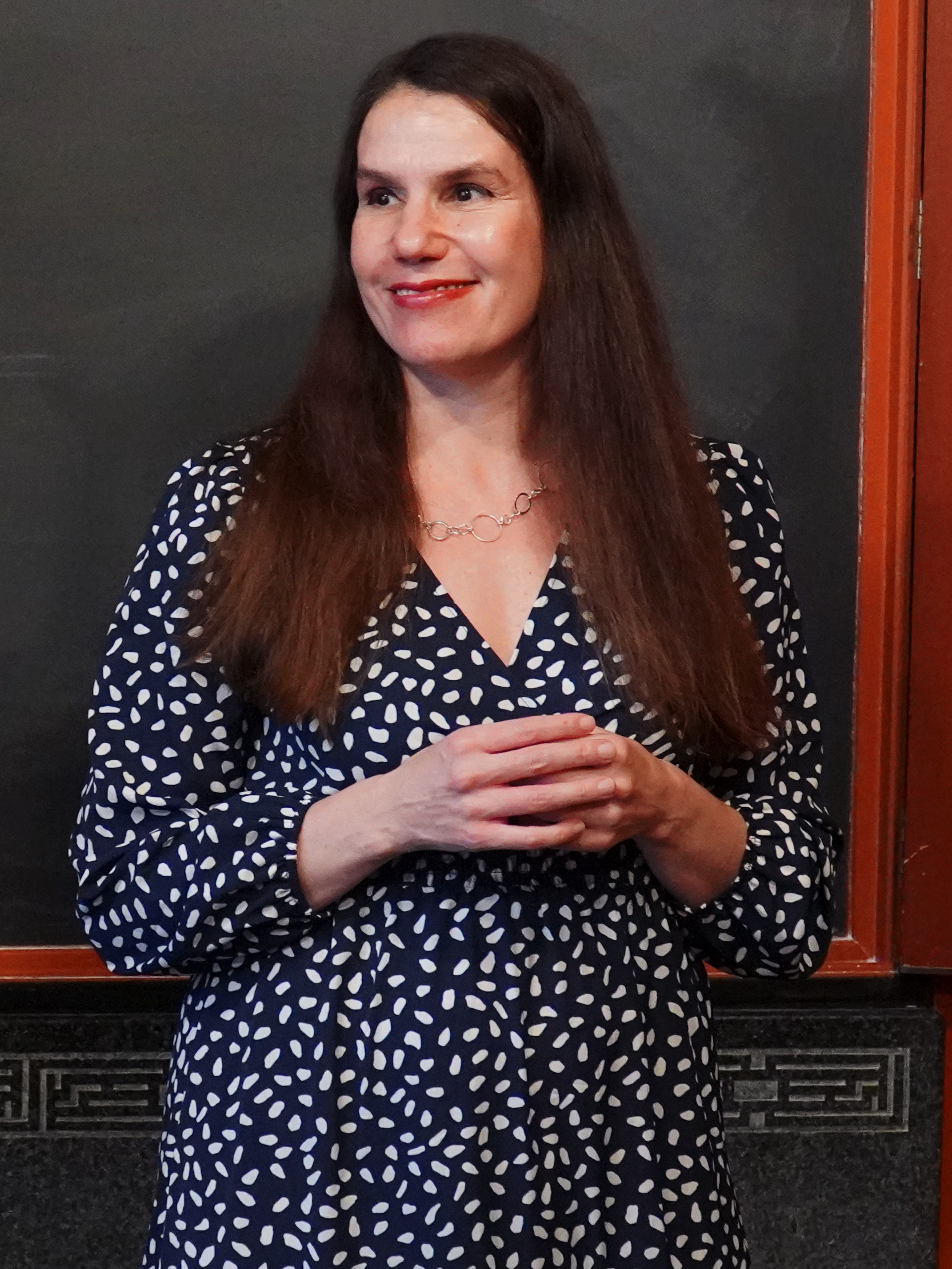
- Born: Caracas, Venezuela
- Occupations: Director; writer; producer; editor; theorist
- Years active: 2009–present

Alexandra Hidalgo is a Venezuelan-American writer, filmmaker, editor, and theorist. She is best known for her work on the documentaries Teta and Vanishing Borders and for her video book Cámara Retórica: A Feminist Filmmaking Methodology for Rhetoric and Composition.

== Early life and education ==
Alexandra was born in Caracas, Venezuela and immigrated to Dayton, Ohio at the age of sixteen. She holds a BA from the Honors Tutorial College, a MA in creative writing from Naropa University, and a Ph.D. in Rhetoric and Composition from Purdue University.

== Career ==
Hidalgo is the Crow Chair and associate professor of English at the University of Pittsburgh. Before moving to Pittsburgh, she was an associate professor at Michigan State University’s Department of Writing, Rhetoric, and American Cultures. She is the co-founder and editor-in-chief of the digital peer-reviewed journal constellations: a cultural rhetorics publishing place. From 2010 to 2014, she was the editor-in chief of the online publication agnès films: supporting women and feminist filmmaker.

Hidalgo's YouTube channel, All the Love!, features content about family, books, movies, and TV shows. Notable videos from the channel include: her on-location review of When Harry Met Sally (1989) with her husband Nathaniel Bowler; her sit-down “TV Take” on Amy Sherman-Palladino’s Étoile (2025); as well as her sit-down “Bookish Take” on Ann Patchett’s Tom Lake (2023).

Her newsletter, Love in Many Genres, also explores similar topics, using “prose, video, and photography to explore love in all its messy and wondrous glory.” Notable essays from Love in Many Genres include: “Traveling Heavy,” a reflection on traveling to the 2025 Association of Writers & Writing Programs Conference (AWP) in Los Angeles, California and the cost and benefit of going the extra mile in our professional endeavors; “Can We Make Our Past Selves Happy?” in which Hidalgo muses on giving a guest talk at the University of Colorado Boulder and her time at Naropa University as a Creative Writing MFA student from 2002 to 2004; as well as “Mothers and Grandmothers,” a deep-dive into how time and distance can hinder some relationships while leaving others unscathed.

Hidalgo's debut documentary feature, Vanishing Borders, screened at the All Lights India International Film Festival and Glendale International Film Festival. It also won a Kudos Endeavor Award for Human Spirit feature at the Docs Without Borders Film Festival. In 2017, her documentary film, Teta, screened at the Athens International Film and Video Festival and Boston Latino International Film Festival. It also won the Best Documentary Film Award at the 10th Jaipur International Film Festival.

== Themes ==
Hidalgo explores love, motherhood, immigration, and the experiences of women filmmakers in her films, writing, and academic work.

Love:

Hidalgo argues that contrary to general belief, it can be useful to get feedback from those closest to us, including spouses. She discusses the value of what she calls “Feedback Partners,” who can be romantic partners, relatives, collaborators, or friends who have a sustained investment in one's work over the course of one's lifetime. She describes her work with her husband, Nathaniel Bowler, this way:

“Nate and I have spent 22 years editing draft after draft of each other's writing, and he reluctantly works as the cinematographer for my films. We untangle each other's creative visions and tackle our artistic anxieties together. In a lifetime of magnificent feedback friendships and collaborations, no one is more pivotal to my success and sanity than my feedback partner.”

Bowler not only works as her editor, but is also the cinematographer in her film and video projects.

Motherhood:

Hidalgo looks at motherhood from the perspective of being a daughter and also a mother. She examines how complicated it can be for mothers and daughters to remain close and connected to each other when separated by immigration and when dealing with the repercussions of traumatic events like divorce.

Hidalgo also looks at how being a mother can expand one's creative and intellectual boundaries, as she discusses her films and writing featuring her children:

“It wasn't until I had my first son that I learned to film images that reached viewers’ emotional cores. After he was born, I had many complex and undeniable feelings for this being that words could not explain, and I needed the camera and its prowess at capturing visual metaphors to help me untangle my love for him.”

Immigration:

Being an immigrant from Venezuela to the US, Hidalgo analyzes the ways immigrants develop hybrid identities that, while sometimes difficult to sustain, can also be an asset to immigrants and their host country. She looks at “immigration from various angles, including what immigrants gain from coming to a country and what the country gains from their presence.”

Hidalgo is interested in using media and academic writing to help people “understand that immigrants are human beings with really powerful stories." She argues that “The more we hear these personalized stories, the more we become compassionate.”

Women filmmakers:

Hidalgo explores the ways that women filmmakers engage women audiences and inspire them to tell their own stories:

“I cried the first time I watched [Agnès Varda’s] ‘The Gleaners and I’ after having to teach violent, white-male driven films to my students week after week—there was this sense of relief, followed by the pure joy of seeing this woman's journey. Gleaners made it clear that I could also make films and that I could do it on my own terms.”

She has collaborated on a number of campaigns on behalf of women filmmakers, including a 2017 open letter to the Cannes Film Festival requesting better treatment of mothers and parents in general, which included “easy steps for Cannes to take that can lead to more inclusivity, from letting parents know where they can and cannot bring children to providing child care, dedicated breastfeeding venues and meet-ups for parents.”

== Personal life ==
Hidalgo descends from a family of writers. Her father, the Venezuelan American economist, writer, and inventor Miguel Hidalgo, disappeared in the Venezuelan Amazon when she was six years old. The mystery and his absence had a profound impact on her life.

Her grandmother, Olga Briceño, was a celebrated writer of historical fiction books in Spain during the 1930s. In 1945, Briceño published her memoir Cocks and Bulls in Caracas in the US about her experiences growing up in Venezuela. Hidalgo's desire to be a storyteller was shaped by their legacies.

At the age of 16 in 1993, Hidalgo moved to Dayton, Ohio, marking a pivotal transition in her life. Seven years later, she married Nathaniel Bowler, a key collaborator who works as the cinematographer for her films and also edits her writing. Together, they navigate the complexities of filmmaking while balancing their roles as parents to their two sons, William and Santiago Hidalgo-Bowler. Hidalgo often incorporates her experiences as a mother and her family dynamics into her creative projects, adding depth and personal resonance to her work.

== Filmography ==
Year	Title	Contribution	Note
2009	PERFECT: A Conversation with the Venezuelan Middle Class About Female Beauty and Breast Implants	Director/Cinematographer/Producer	
2014	Vanishing Borders	Writer/Director/Editor/Producer	
2016	William and Santiago Simultaneous	Director/Editor/Cinematographer/Producer	
2017	Teta	Writer/Director/Editor/Producer	
2017	A Place at the Table	Director/Editor/Cinematographer/Producer	

== Books ==
- 2017 - Cámara Retórica: A Feminist Filmmaking Methodology for Rhetoric and Composition (video book)
- 2018 - Pixelating the Self: Digital Feminist Memoirs ISBN 978-0-9864333-8-2
