= Vanishing Borders =

2014 documentary film

- Film poster
- Directed by: Alexandra Hidalgo
- Written by: Alexandra Hidalgo
- Produced by: Shanele Alvarez, Alexandra Hidalgo
- Starring: Teboho Moja; Melainie Rogers; Daphnie Sicre; Yatna Vakharia
- Cinematography: Shanele Alvarez
- Edited by: Alexandra Hidalgo
- Music by: Ricardo Lorenz
- Release date: February 14, 2014
- Country: United States
- Language: English

Vanishing Borders is a 2014 American documentary film written, directed, and produced by Alexandra Hidalgo. The film was screened at the All Lights India International Film Festival, Glendale International Film Festival and Commffest, Toronto.

== Plot ==
The film tells the stories of four immigrant women — Teboho Moja, Melainie Rogers, Daphnie Sicre and Yatna Vakharia — living in New York City and improving their communities with their work and activism to celebrate the ways in which immigration can transform not only those who immigrate but the places to which they move.

Teboho Moja is a South African professor of higher education, who worked in the anti-apartheid movement.

Melainie Rogers is an Australian nutritionist whose private practice hires primarily women.

Daphnie Sicre is a Latina raised in Spain, who is an activist and a Ph.D. candidate in educational theater.

Yatna Vakharia is an Indian mother of two and school volunteer, who began attending college when her children became teenagers.

== Awards ==
- Won - Kudos Endeavor Award for Human Spirit Feature at the Docs Without Borders Film Festival, 2016
- Won - International Award of Excellence at the International Film Festival For Environment, Health and Culture, 2016
