= Michael Schelle =

American composer (born 1950)

Michael Schelle (pronounced Shelley; born January 22, 1950, in Philadelphia), is a composer of contemporary concert music. He is also a performer, conductor, author, and teacher.

== Background ==
Schelle grew up in Bergen County, in northern New Jersey, where he studied piano and conducting with Walter Schroeder. After receiving a pre-collegiate certificate from the Trinity College of Music in London, he changed direction for a B.A. in theatre and philosophy from Villanova University (PA). During his four years at Villanova, Schelle was the keyboard player in various regional rock bands, and also Composer in Residence for the Villanova Graduate Theatre, scoring productions of Waiting for Godot, Rhinoceros, and other modernist classics directed by Irene Baird and David Rabe.

Returning to music after Villanova, with eyes now opened wide by discovering experimental theatre, the avant garde, and the music of Igor Stravinsky, Béla Bartók, Charles Ives, Frank Zappa, Edgard Varese, Karlheinz Stockhausen, Krzysztof Penderecki and John Cage, Schelle went on to receive graduate composition degrees from the Hartt School of Music (Connecticut) and the University of Minnesota. Schelle studied composition with Arnold Franchetti, Aaron Copland, Paul Fetler, and Dominick Argento.

== Commissions ==
Schelle's music has been commissioned and / or performed by over 350 orchestras, symphonic bands and professional chamber ensembles across the US and abroad including the Detroit Symphony, the Minnesota Orchestra, Chicago Symphony, Buffalo Philharmonic, Cincinnati Symphony, Milwaukee Symphony, Louisville Orchestra, Indianapolis Symphony, Nashville Symphony, Albany (NY) Symphony, Springfield (Mass) Symphony, Dayton Philharmonic, Honolulu Symphony, Kansas City Symphony, Greenwich (CT) Chorus and Orchestra, Manhattan Chamber Orchestra, Saint Paul Chamber Orchestra, Cleveland Chamber Symphony . . . . also, XTET (Los Angeles), ISIS (Austin, TX), Voices of Change ensemble, the Pittsburgh New Music Ensemble, the Urban Quartet (Phoenix) , the Eastman New Music Ensemble, the Indiana University New Music Ensemble and many others.

- Recent international performances of his music have included Kammerorkester Basel (Switzerland), Czestochowa Philharmonic (Poland), Kremlin Chamber Orchestra, St. Petersburg Chamber Philharmonic, Warsaw Chamber Opera, Brno Philharmonic (Czech Republic), Orquestra Sinfonica Nacional (Costa Rica), the Vale of Glamorgan Music Festival (Cardiff, Wales), Firenza New Music Festival (Italy), the Koenig Ensemble of London and the Kuala Lumpur (Malaysia) Performing Arts Center Wind Symphony.
- Schelle is the author of the 1999 film music book, The Score (Silman-James Press, Los Angeles).
- Schelle is the featured composer in the 2005 documentary, "Extreme Orchestra" IMDb
- Three (3) extended "Composer in Residence" appointments in Japan: Nagoya Imperial University and Aichi Prefectural University of Music and Fine Arts https://web.archive.org/web/20150304180351/http://www.aichi-fam-u.ac.jp/ja/international-exchange/artist-in-residence.html (2009, 2011, 2013)
- Two (two) extended "Composer in Residence" appointments in Poland: Kraków Academy of Music (2016, 2019) and Chopin University of Music (Warsaw, 2016, 2019)
- Schelle's 2002 Wright Flight piano concerto (recorded on Albany Records with the Dayton Philharmonic, Andrew Russo, piano) was 'on tour' throughout China in January 2010 for multiple performances with the South Shore Orchestra (Chicago) in Shanghai, Beijing, Ningbo and Hangzhou.
- Much of Schelle's orchestra and wind ensemble music is published by Lauren Keiser Music Publishing / Keiser Classical, in St. Louis and New York City.

== Grants and awards ==
Schelle has received composition grants and awards from the Rockefeller Foundation, the National Endowment for the Arts, the New York State Arts Council, the New England Foundation for the Arts, the Welsh Arts Council (Cardiff), Arts Midwest, the Great Lakes Arts Alliance, American Piano Awards, the International Percussive Arts Society, the Barlow Endowment for Music Composition (Utah, 1989), the National Band Association (2012 Revelli Composition Prize) and many other organizations.

In 2005/2006, funded by a grant from the American Symphony Orchestra League, Inc. (NYC), Schelle was Composer in Residence for the Albuquerque Youth Symphony organization, writing a new work for each of the five AYS orchestras. All five works were premiered in May 2006, at Popejoy Hall on the campus of the University of New Mexico.

2007/2008: by way of a generous Individual Artist Grant from the Arts Council of Indianapolis, Schelle enjoyed an extended visit to Japan where he worked with legendary avant garde composer Hifumi Shimoyama (b. 1930) in Tokyo. Schelle also received an ACI grant in 1999/2000.

2023: Schelle wins the "Crossroads of America" composers competition sponsored by the South Bend (IN) Symphony Orchestra with his "Summit at San Quentin". First Prize includes a commission for a major new orchestral work to be premiered during the SBSO 2023/24 season.

== Guest composer ==
In addition to working with many American orchestras, Schelle is a frequent Guest Composer for American universities and schools of music, where he gives master classes on his music and works with young composers and student ensembles. Among many others, he has been featured for guest composer residencies at Indiana University, CCM, Arizona State University, Washington State University, California Lutheran University, Sam Houston State University. Carnegie Mellon University, Kent State University, Southern Illinois University, University of Louisiana-Lafayette, Eastern Michigan University, State University of New York, University of Notre Dame, Capital University (OH), University of Massachusetts, Trinity University (TX), University of Wisconsin-Madison and many others. He has also held extended residencies at the Spoleto USA Festival (Charleston, SC), the Wolf Trap Center for the Performing Arts (Vienna, VA), the MacDowell Colony X2, and for various prestigious new music festivals across the US and abroad.

From 2009 to 2013 he served three times as the featured Composer in Residence at both Nagoya Imperial University (Japan) and Aichi Prefectural University of Fine Arts and Music (Japan).

April 2016, May 2019: guest composer / visiting professor at the Chopin University of Music (Warsaw, Poland) and the Krakow Academy of Music.

Schelle's 2014 opera "The End of Al Capone" (music and libretto by Schelle) was premiered in Indianapolis April 2015, and produced in May 2019 by Warsaw Chamber Opera / Chopin University New Music Consortium.

29 December 2022 : Schelle's "Escape from Xishuangbanna", commissioned by the Confucius Institute, is premiered at Carnegie Hall in NYC by the Asian Cultural Symphony Orchestra.

== Compositions ==
Orchestral

- The Fifth Horseman of the Apocalypse (2023)
- Profile in Courage (2023)
- At Long Last (2023), string orchestra
- The Affirmation (2023)
- Escape from Xishuangbanna (2022)
- Trapped Like Rats (2021)
- The Sixth Dimension of Light (2021), string orchestra
- Summit at San Quentin (2019), chamber orchestra
- Virus (2019)
- Resilience (2015), viola, cello and orchestra
- Sun-Wukong (2013)
- Through the Bright Lights of Hell (2013)
- The Exorcism of the Sugar Plum Fairy (2012)
- Guardian (2011), solo violin and orchestra
- Rain (2009), soprano and orchestra
- The Beast of Brazil (2005)
- Ear Infection (2005)
- Vox Humana (2005)
- Extraction on No. 8 (2005)
- Chrysalis (2004)
- Crashout (2004)
- Wright Flight (2002), piano concerto
- Samurai (1999)
- Spider Baby (1996)
- Mayday! (1995)
- Spirits (1993), six biographies for orchestra
- Jonestown Echo (Rev. Jim Jones), from Spirits
- Detour to Nowhere (John Dillinger), from Spirits
- Limberlost (Gene Stratton Porter), from Spirits
- One for the Gipper (Knute Rockne), from Spirits
- Ben Bonhommes Rouge (Ezra Pound), from Spirits
- The Last Ride (James Dean), from Spirits
- Blast (1992)
- Rapscallion (1990)
- After the Meridian: Times of Future Passed (1990), for soloists, chorus and orchestra
- The Big Night (1989)
- Kidspeace (1987)
- Concerto for Two Pianos and Orchestra (1986)
- Swashbuckler! (1984)
- Play Us Chastity on Your Violin (1984), for solo violin and chamber orchestra
- Pygmies II (1983)
- Pygmies (1982)
- Masque (1979)
- El Salon Medico (1977)
- Lancaster Variations (1976)

Wind Ensemble / Symphonic Band

- Hangover Hotel (2020)
- A Far Cry from Fairview (2019)
- O Magma Mysterium (2016)
- Fear Strikes Out (2015), for trombone and wind ensemble
- Extraction on No. 9 (2013)
- The End of the World (2011) - "E.O.W" was the winner of the 2012 National Band Assoc. William D. Revelli Composition Prize
- Prayer (2004), for cello and chamber winds
- When Hell Freezes Over (1996)
- Guttersnipe (1994)
- Contraband (1991)
- Seven Steps from Hell (1985)
- Cliffhanger March (1984)
- King Ubu (1981)

Opera / Choral / Vocal

- The End of Al Capone (2014), mono-opera for voice and large chamber ensemble
- Ra-ahmen (2010), SATB and four doublebasses
- Aesop Rules (1997), 55:00 musical for kids (grades 1–5), tenor sax, keyboards, percussion
- Pipuff (1992), SATB
- Struwwelpeter (1991), for tenor and piano (or chamber ensemble)
- The Great Soap Opera (1988), 90:00 chamber opera
- Six Seasonal Anthems (1987), SATB, organ
- Dei Angelus (1987), SATB, organ
- Caroleluia (1987), SATB
- Swanwhite (1981), for soprano and piano
- The Wife Wrapt in Wether's Skin (1977), TTBB

Chamber

- Kingfish Levinsky (2023), oboe (or soprano sax), tenor sax and piano
- Kingfish Levinsky (2023), clarinet, cello and piano
- Kingfish Levinsky (2023), bass clarinet, contrabass and piano
- Cut and Run (2023), clarinet and piano
- When Fears Cease to Be (2023), violin and accordion
- Fear and Loathing in the Carthusian Monastery at Valldemossa (2022), for 2 pianos (6 hands) and chamber ensemble
- Fear and Loathing in the Carthusian Monastery at Valldemossa (2022), for 2 pianos (6 hands)
- Kurashikku (2021), flute / bass flute, clarinet / bass clarinet and piano
- Jackhammer Heracles (2021), alto sax (or B♭ clarinet) and piano
- Discreet Street (2021), for double bass and piano
- In the Shame of Her Own Silence (2021), flute, clarinet, violin, cello, piano
- Fünf Verschwörungstheorien (2021), wind quintet (fl, ob, cl, horn, bsn)
- Stasis at Warp Speed (2020), clarinet and piano
- Papa Hemingway's Polydactyls (2020), chamber ensemble
- Hichirikima (2020), for two cellos
- JUKAI: The Mt. Fuji Suicide Forest (2019), hichiriki and chamber ensemble
- Summit at San Quentin (2019), large chamber ensemble
- Psalm of these Days (2019), for eight pianos
- The Tragic Paradigm of Miss Mi$-T's Misguided Expectations (2019), chamber ensemble
- The Eisenstein Mummers (2018), chamber ensemble
- Hesitation Killed the Cat (2018), chamber ensemble
- Rosemary's Baby's Accordions (2018), chamber ensemble
- Vorsichtig (2017), guitar duo
- The Illusion of Invincibility (2017), violin and piano
- My Tears Fall Dry (2017), violin and piano
- Chords That Rhyme With Your Eyes (2017), clarinet and piano
- Bury the Hatchet (2017), for guitar quartet
- Tranquilizer (2015), for chamber ensemble
- The Wolves of Parnassus (2014), for chamber ensemble
- Mystic Mourning (2014), for solo violin and chamber ensemble
- Burning Crusaders (2014), for five trumpets and percussion
- Crusher (2013), for solo guitar w/piano accompaniment
- Meine Grossmutter Kostbaren Klarinette (2013), for clarinet and piano
- My Precious Iron Lung (2013), for horn and piano
- My Precious Iron Cello (2013), for euphonium and piano
- Aka Sakana (2012), for solo clarinet
- Their House Was Around Here, Somewhere ... (2012), for piano and chamber ensemble
- Sprechstisambastimme (2011), for string quartet
- Red Knuckles (2011), for clarinet and tenor sax
- Say Goodnight, Gracie (2010), for large chamber ensemble
- Nagoya Spiral (2009), for any four players and pre-recorded medium
- Calhoun (2009), for large chamber ensemble
- The Fall of Susan McClary (2009), for chamber ensemble
- No Child Left Behind (2007), large chamber ensemble
- The Viola the Wind Swept Away (2007), for solo viola (or any instrument) and chamber ensemble
- Heartland (2007), for clarinet, tenor sax, violin, cello, bass, piano and percussion
- Struwwelpeter (2006), for tenor and piano (1991), for tenor and chamber ensemble (2006)
- It's Curtains for You, Bub (2005), for large chamber ensemble
- Prayer (2004), for solo cello with harp and piano
- Gimme Shelter (2001), for violin and piano
- Godzilla (1997) for clarinet, bass clarinet, tenor sax, piano, bass, percussion
- Berlin Archetype (1990) for clarinet, cello, piano (and off-stage trumpet and tenor)
- Inizio (1989), for violin and cello
- Musica Magnetizzare (1988), for five chamber players
- Howl (1986), for solo clarinet and four chamber players
- Play Us Chastity on Your Violin (1984), for solo violin and large chamber ensemble
- Music for the Alabama Kid (1984), for chamber ensemble
- Music for Two Pianos (1982)
- Cry Wolf (1981), for cello and 5 percussionists
- Music for the Last Days of Strindberg (1979), for chamber ensemble
- Chamber Concerto (1978), for solo violin, flute, cello and piano

Solo

- The Case of the Hesitant Heretic (2022), for piano
- Campari (2020), for piano
- Ulterior Motives (2019), for piano
- Fünf Fantasien nach Bach (2011–19), for piano
- Fünf Halluziationen von Beethoven (2016–19), for piano
- Aka Sakana (2012), for solo clarinet
- Straight, No Lithium (2010), nine bipolar preludes for piano
- Janus: Third Sonata (1998), for piano
- Subwoofer (1996), for flute
- Hammerstein (1995), for piano
- Racing With Rabbits (1988), solo percussionist
- Rattlesnake (1983), solo percussionist
- Blue Plate Special (1983), for tuba alone (with aux. percussion)
- Redbud (1982), for double bass
- Second Sonata (1979), for piano

== Current ==
Schelle is Composer in Residence and Founder/Director of the JCA Composers Orchestra (new music ensemble) at the School of Music, Butler University, Indianapolis, IN, USA.
