= Donald Keats =

American composer, teacher, and pianist (1929–2018)

Donald H. Keats (May 27, 1929 – April 27, 2018) was an American composer, teacher, and pianist.

== Biography ==
Keats attended Yale University as an undergraduate, where he studied with Quincy Porter and Paul Hindemith. He completed his MA at Columbia University, where he studied with Otto Luening and Henry Cowell. He attended the Staatliche Hochschule für Musik in Hamburg as a Fulbright Scholar before returning to America. Keats received his PhD from the University of Minnesota, where he studied with Dominick Argento and Paul Fetler. He also won two Guggenheim Fellowships (1964–65, 1972–73), an NEA grant, and was a Fulbright scholar (1954–55, renewed 1955-56). He also studied composition at Yale with Henry Cowell.

He taught at Antioch College from 1957 to 1975, and the University of Denver's Lamont School of Music from 1975 to 1999. He also taught at the Aspen School of Music and was visiting professor at the University of Washington from 1969 to 1970. He died on April 27, 2018, at the age of 88.

== Important works ==
- Symphony No.2: (An) Elegiac Symphony (1964)
- Piano Sonata (1971)
- String Quartet #1
- String Quartet #2
- Keats considers his First Symphony as an important piece; both it and his Elegiac Symphony won Rockefeller Foundation-sponsored competitions, resulting in performances by the Kansas City Philharmonic and the Seattle Symphony respectively
- Principal Publisher: Boosey & Hawkes
