= Claudette Sorel =

French-American pianist and educator (1932–1999)

- Born: 10 October 1932; Paris, France
- Died: 6 August 1999 (aged 66); Hampton Bays, New York, U.S.
- Education: Juilliard School; Curtis Institute of Music; Columbia University
- Occupations: Pianist, educator

Claudette Sorel (10 October 1932 – 6 August 1999) was a French-American pianist and educator. She was an advocate of equal rights for women in the arts, and especially equal rights for women whose aspirations were to become pianists.

== Early life and education ==
Sorel was born in Paris, France, on 10 October 1932. She emigrated to the United States with her family in 1940 prior to the Nazi invasion of France. At age 10 she received a scholarship to study at the Juilliard School, and at age 11 she debuted on the concert recital stage, performing with the New York Philharmonic Orchestra at Carnegie Hall. A reviewer in The New York Times wrote that "a child capable of so polished and eloquent an example of pianism has a future worth watching". She went on to study at the Curtis Institute of Music from 1948 to 1953, and simultaneously studied mathematics at Columbia University.

== Career ==
She performed frequently as a piano soloist both during and after her studies. While researching the composer Sergei Rachmaninoff at the Moscow Conservatory, Sorel discovered two nocturnes by the composer that had never previously been performed. She premiered these in 1973 at a recital celebrating the composer's centenary. This was her last public recital – the following year she was injured in a fall on an ice-covered sidewalk and quit performing.

Later in her life, Sorel published books for young pianists and taught piano at the University of Kansas, Ohio State University and SUNY Fredonia. At SUNY she chaired the piano department and was the first woman to be named a Distinguished Professor at the institution. Sorel founded the Sorel Organization in 1996, dedicated to the memory of her parents; this organization promotes women in music. She was an advocate for women in the arts, publishing an article in Music Journal in 1968 advocating equal opportunities for women pianists.

Sorel died of cancer in Hampton Bays, New York, on 6 August 1999.
