= Edward Harrison (timpanist) =

Edward Harrison is Principal Timpanist of the Lyric Opera of Chicago and Artist Faculty and Head of Percussion at the Chicago College of Performing Arts, Roosevelt University. An internationally known maraca expert, Harrison is considered the leading exponent of contemporary maraca playing in the United States and Europe. In 1999, he performed the world's first concerto for maraca soloist with symphony orchestra, which was written for him by Ricardo Lorenz, at Chicago's Orchestra Hall. The composition was entitled Pataruco: Concerto for Maracas. The Chicago Sun-Times lauds his "remarkable mastery as a solo performer". He has served on the faculty at DePaul University, Northwestern University and Concordia University Chicago.

Ed Harrison has performed with Leonard Bernstein, Sir Georg Solti, McCoy Tyner, and Paquito D'Rivera. He performs frequently with the Chicago Symphony at the Ravinia Festival. He has done radio and television performances for Nova (Public Broadcasting Service), Metromedia, National Public Radio, WFMT, and WGBH. Harrison has performed on commercial soundtracks (jingles) for McDonald's, Kraft Foods, Sears, Kellogg, and Ameritech.

Harrison is a Master of Music alumni of the New England Conservatory, where he studied with Everett Firth. He attended the Tanglewood Music Center on a Leonard Bernstein Fellowship in 1983 and was invited to return the following year by the Artistic Directors. Harrison was a principal percussionist with the Chicago Sinfonietta from 1994 to 1998. While in Venezuela as Principal Timpanist of the Caracas Philharmonic, he studied with the Joropo virtuoso Maximo Teppa.
