= Dale Warland Singers =

Professional chorus

The CD Cover to "Harvest Home," the last album recorded by the Dale Warland Singers, released in 2005

The Dale Warland Singers (DWS) was a 40-voice professional chorus based in St. Paul, Minnesota, founded in 1972 by Dale Warland and disbanded in 2004. They performed a wide variety of choral repertoire but specialized in 20th-century music and commissioned American composers extensively. In terms of sound, the DWS was known for its purity of tone, intonation, legato sound and stylistic range. During their existence, the DWS performed roughly 400 concerts and recorded 29 CDs.

== Biography ==
Dale Warland was born in Fort Dodge, Iowa, on April 14, 1932, the son of farmers and grandson of Norwegian immigrants. His parents were not highly educated but instilled in him a love of beauty and the arts. Both his father and grandfather sang in the local church choir. (His grandfather held the attendance record for singing in rehearsal and Sunday worship without a single absence.) Warland began taking piano lessons with the church choir director at the age of five and also sang every day in his one-room schoolhouse.

Warland's first conducting job was in high school, in which he had to direct an offstage choir for a school musical. He also began writing music around this time, and even won first prize from the Iowa Federation of Music Clubs for one of his motets. Warland attended St. Olaf College in Northfield, Minnesota, graduating in 1954, where he was directing his own choir in his junior year. After graduating, Warland served in the Air Force for two years where he led a choir consisting of officers and enlisted men. Afterwards, Warland earned his master's degree at the University of Minnesota in 1960 and his Doctorate at the University of Southern California in 1965. Warland taught at Humboldt State College (California), Keuka College (New York), and eventually settled at Macalester College in St. Paul, where he taught from 1967 to 1986.

== History ==
During his career as a college educator, Warland had expressed interest in conducting a professional choir in which the membership was more stable than a college choir. The actual inception of the Dale Warland Singers (DWS) took place in 1972, when Warland received a call from the Walker Art Center (Minneapolis) asking if he would put together a concert of new music. Warland assembled a choir of forty singers, and the concert, which took place on June 12, 1972, was a success.

The unique sound of the DWS is based on many factors. Warland decided he needed forty singers to attain the sound he wanted, rather than the standard sixteen to twenty for most chamber choirs. He chose singers not based on homogeneity but on personality and warmth. He would also audition and choose seating arrangements with his back to the ensemble so that he was judging by sound alone. Singers for the ensemble were chosen based on their strong musical skills, beautiful voice, solid vocal technique, and positive attitude. 355 singers participated in the organization during its existence.

Warland began the DWS during a time when professional choirs were uncommon. However, the 1980-81 season was a turning point in which the DWS offered its first subscription series and hired a full-time manager. In 1982, the DWS began to pay its singers, which set a new precedent for professional choirs nationally.

In 1975, the DWS began regularly performing at the Walker Art Center. The DWS made many tours across the country and to Europe. They have collaborated extensively with many notable ensembles and musicians including the Mormon Tabernacle Choir, Chanticleer, and the Dave Brubeck Quartet. The DWS has additionally sung under the conductors Robert Shaw, Leonard Slatkin, Stanislaw Skrowaczewski, Neville Marriner, Edo de Waart, Hugh Wolff, Bobby McFerrin, David Zinman, Roger Norrington, and James Conlon.

The DWS made many radio appearances, including Garrison Keilor's A Prairie Home Companion and annual broadcasts of "Echoes of Christmas" and "Cathedral Classics" which reached audiences of 1.5 million across the United States. The DWS have also appeared in feature film soundtracks, most notably those of My Best Friend's Wedding and The Garden of Redemption.

The DWS presented its final concert, “I Have Had Singing: A Choral Celebration,” on May 30, 2004, at Orchestra Hall in Minneapolis. Warland had many reasons for retiring at this time. He was at his height musically and wanted time for other pursuits. Because the finances of the ensemble were usually a struggle (the choir never earned an endowment and rarely finished a concert season in the black), the board of directors decided that it was better to disband the choir than to find a successor.

The archives for the DWS are located at the Cincinnati College-Conservatory of Music, which consists of the score library (including more than 1,100 copies of all 270 commissioned works), all organizational and artistic records, and over 300 audio and video recordings of the ensemble's performances.

== Literature ==
The repertoire of the DWS consisted of works ranging from the great choral masterworks to American folk songs to vocal jazz. However, the choir's specialization was twentieth century music. Commissioning and premiering new works was an important part of the DWS's mission. Warland commissioned 270 works from 150 composers, which include Libby Larsen, Dominick Argento, Aaron Jay Kernis, George Shearing, Dave Brubeck, Peter Schickele, Alice Parker, Kirke Mechem, Mary Ellen Childs, Augusta Read Thomas, Janika Vandervelde, Bernard Rands, Emma Lou Diemer, Brent Michael Davids, Bill Banfield, and Eric Whitacre. Stephen Paulus, Frank Ferko and Carol Barnett have been composers-in-residence with the ensemble. Significant works commissioned by the DWS include Water Night by Eric Whitacre, A Procession Winding Around Me by Jeffery Van, and The Road Home by Stephen Paulus. In their final season alone, the DWS premiered sixteen new works by fourteen composers. In 1987, the DWS created a reading and commissioning program, called Choral Ventures, for emerging composers. This program resulted in the commissioning of over fifty works by emerging composers.

In honor of the DWS and their legacy to new music, the American Composers Forum established the "Dale Warland Singers Fund for New Choral Music" in 2004, dedicated to commissioning, performing and recording new choral works.

== Significant performances ==
- 1987: American Choral Directors Association National Conference, San Antonio
- 1987: Colorado Music Festival
- 1990: World Symposium on Choral Music (Sweden, Estonia and Finland)
- 2002: World Symposium on Choral Music (Minneapolis)
- 1982, 1990, 1999, 2003: Chorus America Conferences
- 2002: Ravinia Festival

== Awards ==
=== Warland ===
- 1988: St. Olaf College Distinguished Alumnus Award
- 1989: Outstanding Alumnus Award from University of Southern California Thornton School of Music
- 1995: Michael Korn Founder's Award
- 2001: McKnight Distinguished Artist Award
- 2001: Chorus America's Louis Botto Award For Innovative Action and Entrepreneurial Zeal
- 2003: ASACP's Victor Herbert Award
- 2003: Sally Irvine Ordway Award
- 2004: Distinguished Master Artist Award, University of South Florida
- 2005: American Composers Forum Champion of New Music Award
- 2006: Choral Arts Society of Philadelphia's Individual Leadership in Choral Music Award
- 2007: American Choral Director's Association's Robert Shaw Choral Awards

=== Dale Warland Singers ===
- 1992: Margaret Hillis Achievement Award for Choral Excellence (1992)
- ASCAP Award for Adventurous Programming (1992, 1993, 1996, 1999)
- Grammy nomination for the album Walden Pond (2003)

== Discography ==
- 1979: Echoes of Christmas
- 1979: La Fiesta de la Posada: A Christmas Choral Pageant
- 1980: 250 Years of Great Choral Music
- 1980: Choral Mosaic
- 1981: Americana: A Bit of Folk
- 1981: Carols of Christmas
- 1981: Gloria: 'Twentieth Century Choral Music
- 1981: Swedish Choral Ballads
- 1982: Sing Noel:'Christmas Music of Daniel Pinkham
- 1983: Sing We of Christmas
- 1986: On Christmas Night
- 1987: Stephen Paulus: Carols for Christmas
- 1988: Dominick Argento: Peter Quince at the Clavier—I Hate and I Love
- 1990: A New Creation
- 1991: The Dale Warland Singers: Choral Currents
- 1992: Christmas Echoes, Vol. 1
- 1992: Christmas Echoes, Vol. 2
- 1994: Cathedral Classics
- 1994: Fancie
- 1995: December Stillness
- 1996: Blue Wheat
- 1997: A Rose in Winter
- 1999: Bernstein & Britten
- 2002: Christmas with the Dale Warland Singers
- 2003: Rachmaninoff Vespers
- 2003: Walden Pond
- 2004: Reincarnations
- 2004: Lux Aurumque
- 2005: Harvest Home: Songs from the Heart
