= Tetas =

Tetas may refer to:

- Tetas de Liérganes, a mountain in Cantabria, Spain.
- Tetas de Viana, twin mountains in Guadalajara Province, Spain
- Tetas de María Guevara, Isla Margarita, Venezuela
- Tetas de Cerro Gordo in San Germán, Puerto Rico
- Cerro Las Tetas in Salinas, Puerto Rico
- Cerro de Las Tetas, Serranía del Perijá, La Guajira, Colombia
- Cerro de Las Tetas, Chile
- Cerro Tres Tetas in Potosí, Bolivia
- Cerro Tetas, Chiclayo Province, Peru
- Cerro de Las Tetas, Tinaquillo, Cojedes, Venezuela
- Cerro las Tres Tetas, Barquisimeto, Venezuela
- Cerro Tres Tetas, Argentina
- Tres Tetas Mountain or El Chichión in Costa Grande of Guerrero, Mexico
- Los Tetas, a Chilean Funk band
- Sin tetas no hay paraíso, a Colombian television series

== See also ==
- Teta (disambiguation)
