= Never Stop Singing =

2009 American documentary film

- Starring: Dominick Argento; Anton Armstrong; Philip Brunelle; David Cherwien; Rene Clausen; Stephen Paulus; Robert Robinson; Kathy Romey; Dale Warland
- Narrated by: Brian Newhouse; Julie Moore
- Music by: Mark Henderson
- Country of origin: United States
- Original language: English

Production
- Producers: Peter Myers; Skip Davis
- Cinematography: Matt Ehrling
- Editor: Skip Davis
- Running time: 59 minutes
- Production companies: TPT Documentaries; Wenger Foundation

Original release
- Network: Twin Cities PBS
- Release: June 7, 2009

Never Stop Singing is a one-hour public television documentary film produced by Peter B Myers about choral music in Minnesota that premiered on Twin Cities Public Television (TPT) on June 7, 2009. The film was produced by Peter Myers and co-produced and edited by Skip Davis between February 2008 and April 2009. The documentary includes video from more than 40 interviews with well-known Minnesota composers, conductors, and singers.

== Synopsis ==
The film documents through interviews and examples, the work of Minnesota musicians Dominick Argento, Anton Armstrong, Philip Brunelle, David Cherwien, Rene Clausen, Stephen Paulus, Robert Robinson, Kathy Romey, Dale Warland and other composers who share their passion for the choral arts, and includes performance excerpts featuring Cantus, Minnesota Chorale, and Twin Cities Community Gospel Choir, among others.

== Reception ==
- In 2010, the documentary won an "Arts & Entertainment Program" Upper Midwest Regional Emmy Award as presented by the National Academy of Television Arts and Sciences.
