= Andy Akiho =

American musician and composer (born 1979)

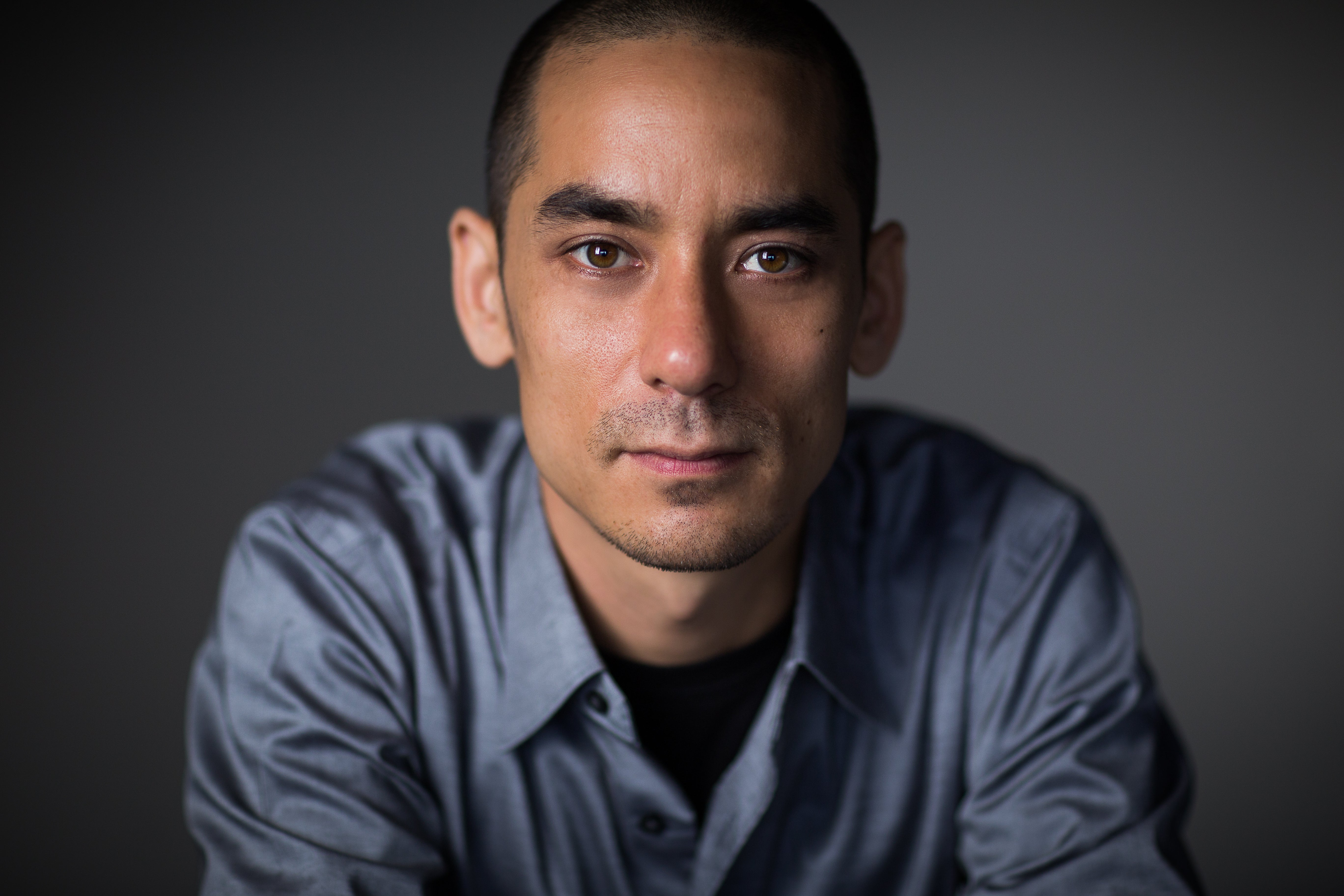
- Akiho in 2025
- Born: February 2, 1979 (age 47); Columbia, South Carolina, U.S.
- Education: University of South Carolina (B.M.), Yale University
- Occupations: Composer, musician
- Years active: 1997–present
- Website: www.andyakiho.com

Andy Akiho (born February 7, 1979, Columbia, South Carolina) is an American musician and composer of contemporary classical music. A virtuoso percussionist based in New York City, his primary performance instrument is steel pans. He took interest in becoming a percussionist when his older sister introduced him to a drum set at the age of 9. Akiho first tried his hand at the steel pan when he became an undergraduate at the University of South Carolina. He began taking several trips to Trinidad after college to learn and play music. From there, he started writing pieces of his own.

== Education ==
Akiho, who is of Japanese heritage, is a graduate of the University of South Carolina with a B.M. in percussion performance, the Manhattan School of Music with a M.Mus. in contemporary performance, and the Yale School of Music with a second M.Mus. in composition. While he was an undergraduate, he was also a member of the Carolina Crown Drum and Bugle Corps of Fort Mill, South Carolina and then of The Cadets Drum and Bugle Corps of Allentown, Pennsylvania.

== Career ==
Akiho has tried to learn everything he could with what was available to him at the time as a percussionist while at the University of South Carolina. He has played in a percussion ensemble as a classical percussionist, concert band, and in orchestras. Akiho had also joined a local West African percussion ensemble, Brazilian drumming ensembles, and steel bands. He began to realize once he finished at South Carolina that he truly loved playing the pans the most and from there he traveled to Trinidad several times without knowing anyone or having any connections. He started by speaking to the locals telling them that he had really wanted to play the steel pan there. During his first visit, he had stayed in Trinidad for five weeks playing with a big band who called themselves the PCS Starlift Steel Orchestra which was led by Ray Holman. In the following year, he played with another steel orchestra called Phase II which was led by Len "Boogsie" Sharpe.

Akiho's interest and confidence in going in the direction of music composition was influenced by him doing the Bang on a Can Summer Festivals in 2007 and 2008. Akiho has studied compositions with Julia Wolfe, David Lang (composer), and Michael Gordon (composer) and was greatly influenced by his teachers Christopher Theofanidis, Ezra Laderman, and Martin Bresnick at Yale School of Music. Jacob Druckman’s “Come Round,” performed at the Manhattan School of Music played a huge role in influencing Akiho when he began composing.

Akiho is involved in a stage production collaboration with The Industry's director, Yuval Sharon, who re-imagines Bertolt Brecht’s play Life of Galileo by taking part in composing the original music for. He found it challenging to collaborate with someone because he was used to doing abstract work to then working in a disciplined environment collaborating with someone who knew what they wanted. The project gave him the feeling that he was writing music for a movie, which in turn inspired him to want to do more of those kinds of collaborative work.

== Awards ==
Sources:

- 2008 Brian Israel Prize
- 2009 ASCAP Morton Gould Young Composers Award
- 2010 Horatio Parker Award
- 2011 Finale National Composition Competition Grand Prize
- 2011 Woods Chandler Memorial Prize
- 2011 Yale School of Music Alumni Award
- 2012 Carlsbad Composer Competition Commission
- 2012 Chamber Music America (CMA) Grant
- 2014 Chamber Music America (CMA) Grant
- 2014 American Composers Orchestra Underwood Emerging Composers Commission
- 2014 Fromm Foundation Commission from Harvard University
- 2014–15 Luciano Berio Rome Prize
- 2015 Lili Boulanger Memorial Fund
- 2022 Grammy Award for Best Contemporary Classical Composition (Nominated)
- 2022 Pulitzer Prize for Music finalist for Seven Pillars
- 2023 Grammy Award for Best Contemporary Classical Composition (Nominated)
- 2024 Grammy Award for Best Contemporary Classical Composition (Nominated)
- 2024 Grammy Award for Best Classical Compendium (Nominated)
- 2024 Grammy Award for Best Classical Instrumental Solo (Nominated)
- 2025 Grammy Award for Best Classical Instrumental Solo
- 2025 Grammy Award for Best Classical Compendium

== Compositions ==
Akiho's early works were largely Caribbean-themed, folk and jazz based works for steel bands and steel pan players like himself. With increased experience and education, he has evolved into a composer of contemporary concert music.

Sources:

- Phatamachickenlick (1997) for snare drum duet
- Hip-Hopracy (2001) for 9 percussionists
- Macqueripe (2002) for tenor steel pan
- Omnipresent (2003) for tenor steel pan
- Daidai Iro (Orange) (2005) for steel pan, cello, bass, and drums with toy piano & glockenspiel optional; also for solo tenor steel pan
- Aka (Red) (2006) for steel pan, cello and/or double bass, drums, and optional violin
- Momo Iro (Pink) (2006) for steel pan, guitar, bass, and drums; also for solo tenor steel pan
- Murasaki (Purple) (2006) for steel pan, harp, cello, bass, and drums; also for solo tenor steel pan
- Hadairo (Beige) (2007) for string quartet, harp, steel pan, bass, and drums; also for solo tenor steel pan
- Karakurenai (Crimson) (2007/2011) flexible instrumentation for one or more players
- I falleN TwO (2008) for steel pan and string quartet
- the rAy's end| (2008) for trumpet, violin, and steel pan
- Vick(i/y) (2008) for prepared piano
- Ki-Iro (2009) for woodwinds, strings, harp, piano & 3 percussion
- to wALk Or ruN in wEst harlem (2008) for flute, bass clarinet, violin, cello, vibraphone, and drums; also (2016) for 8 member percussion ensemble
- 21 (2009) for cello (double loop pedal and kick drum) and steel pan (double tambourine) or marimba (double tambourine)
- Alloy (2009) for steel pans band & metallic drum set
- Amalgamation (2009) for saxophone quartet and digital playback
- NO one To kNOW one (2010) for soprano, flute, clarinet (doubles bass clarinet), cello, piano, percussion, vibraphone and/or steel pan (vibes & pan play same score)
- LIgNEouS 1 (2010) for marimba and string quartet
- Erase (2011) for flute, clarinet (doubles bass clarinet), violin, cello, piano, percussion
- Five Movements for Piano Trio (2011) for piano, violin, and cello
- In/Exchange (2011) for steel pan and string quartet
- LIgNEouS 3 (2011) for marimba and string quartet
- Six Haikus (2011) for baritone voice, trumpet, trombone, and bass clarinet
- Stop Speaking (2011) for snare drum and digital playback
- -intuition ) (Expectation (2012) for trumpet and marimba
- Oscillate (2012) for string orchestra, piano, and 3 percussion
- Three Shades, Foreshadows (2012) for cello and digital playback
- Spiel (2013, rev. 2020) for solo glockenspiel
- Bagatelle (2013) for solo piano
- Transparency (2013) for solo piano
- Two Bridges (2014) Three Movements for Harp Duo
- Deciduous (2014) for violin and lead/tenor steel pan
- LIgNEouS 2 (2014) for marimba and string quartet
- String Quartet 1 "Mobile on a Stream Into the Now" (2012) for string quartet
- Revolve (2013) for string quintet
- Speaking Tree (2013) for brass quintet, string quintet, and percussion
- ...or not at all (2013) for solo glockenspiel
- Tarnished Mirrors (2013/2015) Concerto for ping pong, violin, percussion, and orchestra
- Ricochet (2015) Ping Pong Players (2), Solo Violin, Solo Percussion, Orchestra (2,2,2,2 | 2,2,2,1 | Timp, 2 Perc | Strings)
- Pillar IV (2014) for percussion quartet
- Two Bridges (2014) three movements for harp duo
- Beneath Lighted Coffers (2015) Concerto for steel pan and orchestra
- LIgNEouS 4 (2016) for marimba and string quartet
- LIgNEouS 5 (2016) for marimba and string quartet
- Prospects of a Misplaced Year (2017) for piano and string quartet
- Lost on Chiaroscuro Street (2017) for clarinet, violin, cello, and piano
- Cobalt Canvas (2018) for flute, 2 clarinets, bassoon, trumpet, horn, trombone, 1 percussion, piano (2 players|4 hands), 3 violins, 2 violas, 2 cellos, and double Bass
- Umi (2018) for snare drum and digital playback
- Aluminous (2019) for string quartet and vibraphone
- Percussion Concerto (2019) Concerto for percussion and orchestra
- Amethyst (2020) for solo vibraphone
- Seven Pillars (2021) for percussion quartet
- mARImbA (2021) for solo marimba & vibraphone
- carTogRAPh (2021) for solo multi-percussion
- BeLoud, BeLoved, BeLonging (2022) for wind quartet and steel pan
- Giant's Causeway (2022) for vibraphone and piano
- Sculptures (2023) for orchestra and sculptures
- Portal (2023) for open instrumentation
- Nisei (2024) Concerto for cello and orchestra
- Copper Canvas (2025) for flute, oboe, clarinet, baritone sax and/or bassoon, horn, 2 percussion, piano, harp, 2 violins, viola, and cello
- Timpani Concerto (2026) Concerto for timpani and orchestra

== Discography ==
NO one To kNOW one (Innova Recordings #801), 2011 – Performer and composer

The War Below, 2018 – Composer

Seven Pillars, 2021 – Composer

=== Featured on ===
Vicky Chow – AORTA (New Amsterdam Records) – Composer "Vick(i/y)"

Mariel Roberts – Nonextraneous Sounds (Innova Recordings #247) – Composer "Three Shades, Foreshadows"

RighteousGIRLS – Gathering Blue (Panoramic Recordings PAN03) – Composer "KARakurENAI"

Loadbang – Monodramas (Analog Arts AA1402) – Composer "Six Haikus"

Anthony de Mare – Liaisons: Re-Imagining Sondheim from the Piano (ECM Records 2470-72) – Arranger "Into the Woods"

Hong Kong Philharmonic Orchestra & Bright Sheng – Intimacy of Creativity – Five Year Retrospective (Naxos Records 8.573614-15) – Composer and performer "21 (Acoustic Version)"

Phillip O'Banion – Digital Divide (bcm&d Records 888295404686) – Composer "Stop Speaking"

== Cover versions ==
An alumnus of two top Drum Corps International performing ensembles, Akiho is becoming a popular composer within the activity. In the summer of 2014, the Bluecoats performed to wALK Or ruN in wEst harlem. In 2016, it was performed by The Battalion while Golden Empire, Legends, and Oregon Crusaders played NO one To kNOW one. In 2017, the first corps he marched with, Carolina Crown, had NO one To kNOW one as a featured piece. In 2024, Phantom Regiment used Pillar III.
