= Paul Fetler =

American composer (1920–2018)

Paul Fetler (February 17, 1920 – July 7, 2018; born in Philadelphia, Pennsylvania) was an American composer. He received his bachelor's degree from Northwestern University and was taught composition by David Van Vactor. Following his bachelor's, Fetler earned a master's degrees from Yale, and then accepted a position at the University of Minnesota where he obtained his doctorate. In addition to Vactor, Fetler also studied with Paul Hindemith, Quincy Porter, and Boris Blacher, and taught many composers at Minnesota including Eric Stokes, Donald Keats, Marjorie Rusche, Michael Schelle, Stephen Paulus, Libby Larsen, and Carol Barnett. See: List of music students by teacher: C to F#Paul Fetler.

== Compositional style ==
Fetler's style is atypical of the well-known composers of the 20th century. Fetler's music, as he has described it, is “the merger of listener and music.” Few recordings of Fetler's music exist, though in 2009, the Ann Arbor Symphony Orchestra released an album of Fetler pieces. Works include Fetler's Three Poems by Walt Whitman, Capriccio, and Violin Concerto no. 2.

Three Poems by Walt Whitman, scored for orchestra and narrator, is described as “delicate and sometimes languid but essentially reflective and thoughtful.” The 2nd movement is an exception and is described as “lear in the storm hysteria” by reviewer Bret Johnson.

Fetler's 2nd violin concerto focuses on the interaction of the soloist with the orchestra rather than technical virtuosity, allowing for rich harmonies and thoroughly developed ideas. The challenge to the soloist and ensemble is to set an ethereal and mysterious scene. There is a slight similarity to the Samuel Barber Violin Concerto.

In addition, Fetler wrote many sacred and secular choral works.

Much of Fetler's music focuses on subtlety, richness, and intimacy. Fetler demonstrates a great deal of comfort with orchestration on both small and large scales. The 2nd violin concerto is a demonstration of this as there are many sections featuring few or solo instruments contrasted by sections with full orchestra. Fetler describes his compositional style as “progressive lyricism”. There is little about his style that is avant-garde, especially when compared to composers like John Cage. Fetler's music attempts to engage the listener so they become intertwined with the music, as if there is perfect unity between the piece, performers, and the audience. In this way Fetler's music is very intellectual, though overall conservative, and carefully constructed.

== Selected works ==
=== Choral ===
Sing Alleluia (SATB)

December Stillness (SATB) The following choral works are listed here: http://www.lieder.net/lieder/f/fetler.html. Drum (SATB), Text: Langston Hughes

Madman's Song (SATB), Text: Elinor Wylie

November Night (SATB), Text: Adelaide Crapsey

Now This is The Story (SSA), Text: Dorothy Parker

Wild Swans (SATB), Text: Edna St. Vincent Millay

All Day I Hear (SATB), Text: James Joyce

April (SATB), Text: Sir William Watson

=== Orchestra ===
Celebration

Three Poems by Walt Whitman

Capriccio

Violin Concertos

Contrasts for Orchestra, Mercury Living Presence LP MG50282 (OOP), Minneapolis Symphony, Antal Dorati, Conductor..

Pastoral Suite: Mvt 1 Moods of the River; Mvt 2 Ancient Mountain Chant; Mvt 3 Song of the Wind. Golden Crest LP CRS 4153 (OOP). Macalester Trio (Dedicated to Joseph Roche, Violinist of the Macalester Trio)

=== Chamber ===
Three Impressions (Guitar and Piano) - https://www.amazon.com/Schott-Three-Impressions-Guitar-Piano/dp/B003AGRCT8/ref=sr_1_1?ie=UTF8&qid=1353893033&sr=8-1&keywords=paul+fetler+three+impressions

=== Solo ===
Guitar: Folia Lyrica (for Thomas Koch)

Monologue: https://www.youtube.com/watch?v=LKx7cKs5eU0

Organ: "I Bind unto Myself Today" (tune: ST. PATRICK'S BREASTPLATE)

== Major awards ==
- Guggenheim Award recipient - 1953, 1960
- Society for American Music - 1953
- Ford Found Grantee
- Certificate of Merit from Yale University Alumni Association - 1975
- NEA Award - 1975, 1977, 1987
