= No One Is Alone (song) =

Song by Stephen Sondheim

"No One Is Alone" is a song by Stephen Sondheim from the musical Into the Woods, performed toward the end of Act II as the piece's penultimate number.

== Production ==
During the show's tryouts at the Old Globe theatre, this song was absent. The LA Times recounts: "At that point, there was simply a spot in the 'Woods' script that said 'quartet for Cinderella, Red Riding Hood, Baker and Jack.' During intermission at a Wednesday evening performance, Sondheim showed up with 'No One Is Alone.' He played it for the cast after the show that night, and it was part of the score by Friday. The next day Sondheim and Lapine left for New York." There was initially an issue over whether the song had been inspired by a preexisting poem. James Lapine explained to LA Weekly that he killed the Baker's Wife in Act II because in real life, tragedies happen to human beings, and quoting "No One Is Alone," "Sometimes people leave you halfway through the woods". Stephen Sondheim liked the duality of the title, which trumped the alternate title of "No Man Is An Island".

In 1994, lyrics from the song were emblazoned on a signed charity t-shirt for the Minnesota AIDS Project.

Rob Marshall recounted a story where he heard President Barack Obama quote the song during a speech at the 10th anniversary of 9/11, which inspired him to direct the film version of the stage musical. Half of the number was cut for the film.

== Context ==
In the musical, this song is sung during Act II, as the four remaining leads (Baker, Cinderella, Little Red Riding Hood, Jack) try to understand the consequences of their wishes, and begin to decide to place community wishes over their own. In the musical, the song is interrupted by the arrival of the Giant, but the uninterrupted version appears on the cast album.

The song serves a dual purpose that can demonstrate themes revolving around the notation that even when life becomes hard, others can still support the followed journey. As well as the basis that nothing will always go the way expected, and everything will not revolve around the way it's expected.

== Critical reception and analysis ==
In 1987, Frank Rich of The New York Times described the song as "cathartic" and "beautiful", and thought the song's "terrifying opening admonition" of mother cannot guide you as a callback to the frantic rant in the Gypsy number "Rose's Turn". In 2014, the publication's Stephen Holden suggested that the song was a " double-edged lullaby" due to "acknowledg[ing] that everyone is ultimately alone" while asserting that the "shared understanding of that isolation makes life bearable". The LA Times thought the song was "remarkable". While claiming that the song has the potential to come across as "unearned sentimentality", Variety thought the crew of the original stage version managed to turn the song into an "affirmation of the newfound society of sorts that represents a clearing in the woods". New York Magazine thought the song was the closest to being a self-contained tune, as opposed to the others which come across as musical "foreplay". The Cambridge Companion to the Musical suggests the song is a "benevolent anthem to outsiders".

The LA Times also commented on the switch from "individually sought wish-fulfillment" to "togetherness" that becomes realised in this song. Chris Bay described the song as a "magnificent double duet" in his essay A Look Behind Into the Woods. In Don Whittaker and Missy Wigley's essay Once Upon a Time to...Happily Ever After, cited the song's universal theme that permeates throughout Sondheim's work, from Bobby in Company to George in Sunday In The Park With George to Fosca in Passion. Into The Woods cinematographer Dion Beebe asserted that the song accurately sums up the struggles and challenges of life: "you will lose people in the Woods as you go and your expectations will change as you experience the joys and sadness of life." The book You Could Drive a Person Crazy: Chronicle of an American Theatre Company stated that the second meaning of the reassuring and positive song, which is a warning and caution for how one's actions affect others, "raises this show out of the ordinary". The book Sondheim and Lloyd-Webber: The New Musical and New York Magazine both suggest the song has an aural resemblance to The Candy Man. The song has the form of AABA. The song is frequently compared with You'll Never Walk Alone from Carousel, which You've Got to Have a Dream: The Message of the Musical rejects. In analysing how the second act relies on a sense of accumulated community wisdom, Reading Stephen Sondheim: A Collection of Critical Essays draws ties between this song and an earlier number called It Takes Two, which was originally included as a reprise in the Act II finale in the pre-Broadway tryouts.

Bustle ranked the song at #2 in a ranked list of songs from the film version. The book Walking in the Wonder: A Memoir of Gratitude for a Lifetime of Miracles' states the number is the "hit song" of the show.

== Covers ==
The song was covered in the Glee episode "Bash", in which Kurt Hummel's friends rally around him after he is the victim of a gay bashing, while trying to defend another gay man from being attacked.

Jazz artist Cleo Laine recorded a version of the song for her album Cleo Laine Sings Sondheim, which secured Jonathan Tunick the 1988 Grammy Award for Best Instrumental Arrangement Accompanying Vocalist(s)/Best Background Arrangement.

The film version of the song was nominated for an OFTA Film Award for Best Music, Adapted Song, along with two other numbers from the production.

Judy Collins recorded a cover of the song on her album "A Love Letter to Sondheim" in 2017.

The American jazz composer Fred Hersch composed a piece "No One Is Alone" for Liaisons: Re-Imagining Sondheim from the Piano inspired by the Sondheim song.

The song was performed by Mandy Patinkin as Satan in the Touched By An Angel episode "Netherlands" when he tempts Monica to climb to the top of a cliff and jump off.

Bernadette Peters, who originated the role of the Witch in the Broadway production, sang the song for Take Me to the World: A Sondheim 90th Birthday Celebration.
