= Rodney Sharman =

Canadian composer and flutist

Rodney Sharman (born 24 May 1958) is a Canadian composer and flutist based in Vancouver. His music has been performed in over 30 countries worldwide. He has won several international and national awards, including First Prize in the 1984 CBC Competition for Young Composers. His chamber opera, Elsewhereless, a collaboration with Atom Egoyan, premiered in 1998 and has been staged 35 times internationally.

== Biography ==
Sharman earned degrees from the University of Victoria School of Music (Victoria, B.C.) and the Staatliche Hochschule für Musik (Freiburg, Germany). In May 1991, he earned a PhD from the State University of New York at Buffalo. Sharman studied under Murray Adaskin, Rudolf Komorous, Brian Ferneyhough, Morton Feldman, David Felder, Frederic Rzewski, Louis Andriessen and Lucas Foss.

Sharman was guest composer at the Institute of Sonology (Utrecht, Netherlands) in 1983-84. He taught at Wilfrid Laurier University, the University of British Columbia School of Music, the School for the Contemporary Arts and Faculty of Graduate Liberal Studies, Simon Fraser University. Sharman was the Vancouver Symphony’s (VSO) Composer-in-Residence from 1997 to 2000 and its Composer/Music Advisor from 2000 to 2001. He was Composer-in-Residence of the National Youth Orchestra of Canada in 2004, and he was Composer-in-Residence of the Victoria Symphony 2008-2010.

The Canadian Section of the International Society for Contemporary Music (ISCM) elected him President from 1991-95. Canadian League of Composers (CLC) elected Sharman President from 1993-98. He has served on the CLC Council from 1988 to 1999.

In 1990, Sharman was awarded the Kranichsteiner Music Prize at the Darmstadt summer courses in Germany.

== Style ==
Sharman's music is notable for its heavy use of extended techniques and exploration of new timbres. He often writes for uncommon instruments or unusual ensembles. He is also known for his opera transcriptions, cabaret songs, and music for harp.

== Selected works ==
- The Proximity of Mars (1988)
- In Changing Light (1995)
- Elsewhereless (1998)
- Scarlattiana (1999)
- Four Seasons, One Tree (2001)
- The Ecstasy of Saint Teresa (2005)
- Departures (2008)
