= Colorado Creative Industries =

Agency of the state government of Colorado, US

Colorado Creative Industries, formerly known as the Colorado Council on the Arts, is an agency of the state government of Colorado, responsible for the promotion of the arts. It was formed in July 2010, when the Council on the Arts and Art in Public Places programs merged to become Colorado's Creative Industries Division. Its budget combines state funds with federal funds from the National Endowment for the Arts, and it is a division of the Colorado Office of Economic Development and International Trade. Its offices are located in Denver.

== Activities ==
The agency's activities include:

- Awarding grants to arts organizations
- Creating designated art districts in cities and towns
- Providing affordable housing to artists
- Giving awards to artists

== See also ==
- State of Colorado
