= Sorel Organization =

- The Elizabeth and Michael Sorel Charitable Organization
- Formation: 1996; 29 years ago
- Founder: Claudette Sorel
- Type: Nonprofit
- Headquarters: New York City, New York, U.S.

The Elizabeth and Michael Sorel Charitable Organization, commonly known as the Sorel Organization, is a nonprofit organization based in New York City. Its mission is "to keep musical excellence alive and to help expand the boundaries for women in music". The organization sponsors several competitions for women composers, conductors, and musicians, including the Sorel Medallions. The Sorel Organization was founded in 1996 by Claudette Sorel.
