= Prospect Park Picnic House =

Building in New York City

Coordinates: 40.6656°N 73.9716°W

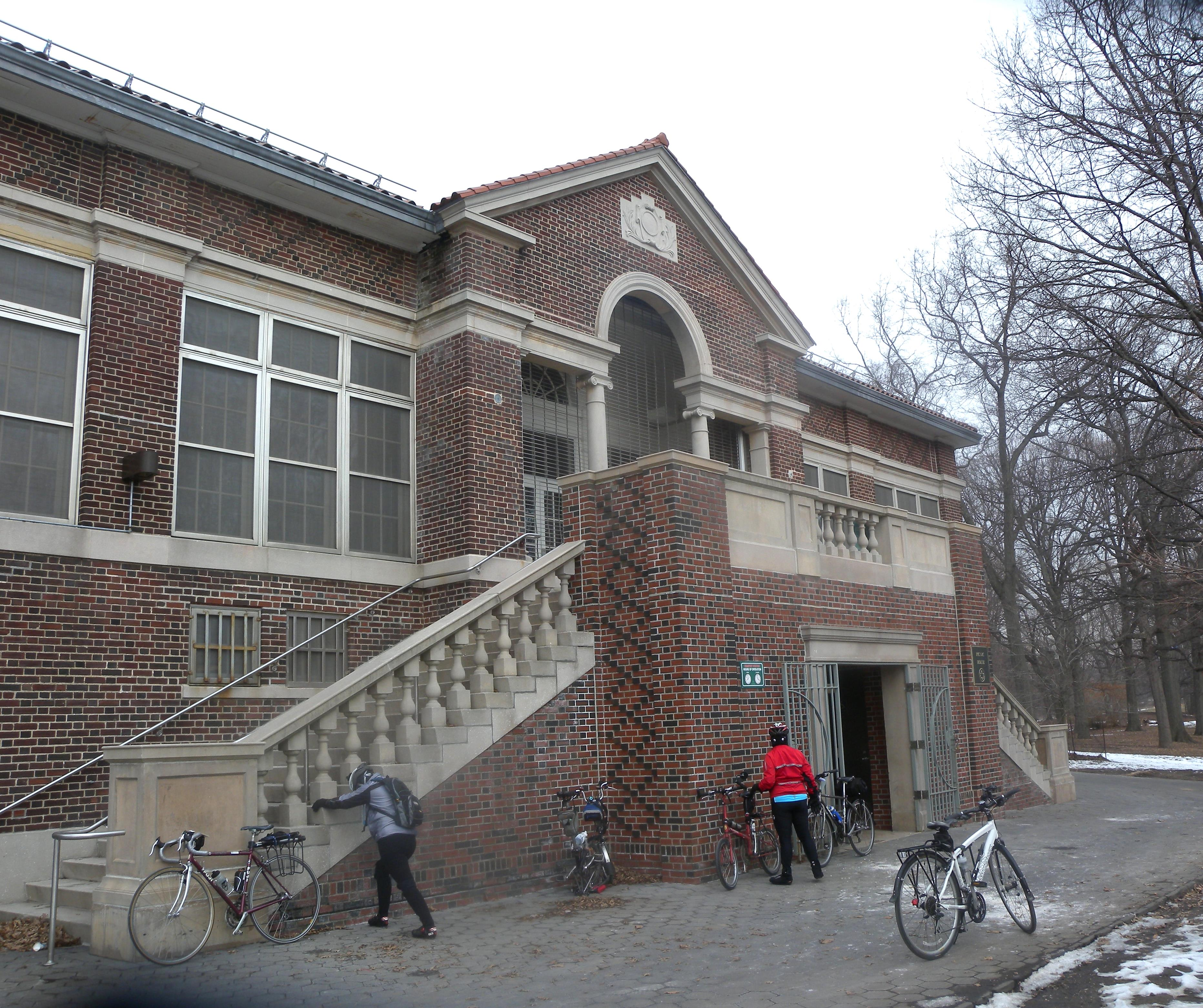
Eastern side of the Picnic House Southern face of Prospect Park Picnic House in summer

Map of notable buildings and structures at Prospect Park (note: not all entrances shown). Click on points for more details.

The Prospect Park Picnic House is located in Long Meadow on the west side of Prospect Park in Brooklyn, New York City, United States. Built in 1927, in the colonial revival style it replaced an earlier rustic structure that had burned down the previous year. The Picnic House is a two story structure with an open room on the upper story and bathroom facilities, storage and a concession stand below. The structure was designed by J. Sarsfield Kennedy, who is most known for designing the "Gingerbread House" (1917) in Bay Ridge. The building was designated part of the Prospect Park Scenic landmark, a New York City scenic landmark, in 1975 and is part of the park's National Register of Historic Places listing.

The upper story of the Picnic House is a popular wedding and event space offering "floor-to-ceiling windows, hardwood floors and a working brick fireplace".

The coffee shop Winner in the Park, which opened in March 2020, operates out of the first floor as a parks concession.
