= Carol E. Barnett =

American composer (born 1949)

Carol Edith Barnett (born 23 May 1949) is an American composer. She was born in Dubuque, Iowa, and studied at the University of Minnesota with Dominick Argento and Paul Fetler (composition), Bernard Weiser (piano) and Emil J. Niosi (flute). She graduated with a bachelor's degree in music theory and composition in 1972 and a masters in theory and composition in 1976.

After completing her education, Barnett went on the road, playing keyboard and singing background vocals with Mexican guitar player Ben Peña, worked as a freelance music copyist (1976-1997), and played in the Children's Theatre pit and various community orchestras (1980-2016).

She married Minnesota Orchestra violist John Tartaglia in 1985.

Barnett was composer-in-residence with the Dale Warland Singers from 1991 to 2001, and an adjunct instructor in music theory and composition at Augsburg College in Minneapolis from 2000 to 2015.

She was awarded the 2003 Nancy Van de Vate International Prize for Opera for her chamber opera, Snow,, which she developed in part during a 1991 residency at the Camargo Foundation in Cassis, France. Her music theater work Meeting at Seneca Falls was featured at the 2006 Diversity Festival in Red Wing, MN. The World Beloved: A Bluegrass Mass, commissioned in 2006 by VocalEssence and written with Marisha Chamberlain, had its Carnegie Hall debut in February 2013, and has become a favorite across the country.

Barnett is a charter member of the American Composers Forum. She resides in Minneapolis and works as a freelance composer.

== Works ==
Works include:

- American Kaleidoscope (orchestra) 2010
- An American Thanksgiving (SATB divisi) 2003
- Angelus ad virginem (SATB divisi) 2010
- Aprile/April (SATB divisi) 1997
- Bega (SATB divis, piano) 2011
- By and By (SATB divisi) 1995
- Children of the Heavenly Father (SATB) 2000
- Children’Songs SATB, clarinet, piano) 1996
- Christmas Eve, Bells (SATB divisi) 1991
- Cinco Poemas de Bécquer SATB divisi, soprano recorder, guitar, wind chimes) 1979
- Cindy (SATB divisi, piano or guitar)
- Concerto for Horn and Orchestra 1985
- Coy Pond Suite (big band) 2014
- Cyprian Suite (concert band) 2002
- Cyprus: First Impressions (alto flute, strings) 2000
- Dance and Sing (SATB, piano) 1991
- Dance of Zálongo (SA, SATB, claves, piano) 1998
- The Darkling Thrush (SATB divisi, string quartet) 2017
- The Day of Hope (women's chorus, oboe, percussion, harp) 2004
- Deep River (SATB divisi) 1994
- An Elizabethan Garland (SATB divisi) 1994
- Epigrams, Epitaphs SATB, 4-hand piano) 1986
- Four Chorale Meditations (violin) 1982
- Franklin Credo (SATB) 1996
- God Bless the Young Folk (SATB, piano) 2008/2017
- Golden Slumbers (SATB divisi) 1994
- Great Day (SATB divisi) 2005
- Hodie (SATB divisi) 1998
- I Sing the Birth (SATB divisi, percussion) 2003
- Ithaca (baritone, guitar) 2001
- The King of Yellow Butterflies (SATB divisi) 1993
- The Last Invocation (SATB divisi) 1988
- Little Potato (arrangement of the Malcolm Dalglish tune; SATB divisi) 1989
- Many Songs I’ve Heard: Melodies From Eastern Europe (2 pianos) 2012
- March to Glory: “Draw Me Nearer” (organ) 2013
- Marian Variants (concert band) 2008
- Meeting at Seneca Falls (soprano, mezzo, baritone, narrator, small instrumental ensemble) 1998
- Mortals & Angels: A Bluegrass Te Deum (SATB, fiddle, mandolin, banjo, guitar, bass) 2017
- Most Holy Night (SATB divisi) 2016
- Musica, Dei donum optimi (SATB divisi) 2016
- My People Are Rising (SA, violin, doumbek) 2017
- My Soul's Been Anchored in the Lord (SATB divisi) 2001
- Mythical Journeys (flute, guitar) 1991
- Near Odessa (SA, piano) 2013
- Nocturnes for Chamber Orchestra 1980
- Oh, Yes! (SATB divisi) 1996
- One Equal Music (TTBB divisi) 2001
- Overture to a Greek Drama (orchestra) 1994
- Piano (After D.H. Lawrence) 1996
- Pilot Me (SATB divisi) 2003
- Praise (organ, steel pan or marimba) 2007
- Prelude and Romp (concert band) 2008
- Red River Valley (SATB divisi, oboe, harp) 1991
- Remember the Ladies (SA, piano) 2011
- Requiem for Treble Voices (SSA) 1981
- Safe in the Arms of Jesus (SATB divisi) 2004
- Sappho Fragments (mezzo-soprano, soprano sax, vibraphone/marimba, bass) 2007
- Shaker Suite: Canterbury (woodwind quintet) 2014
- Shepherds, Rejoice! (SATB) 2012
- Sonata for Horn and Piano 1973
- Song of Perfect Propriety (SSA, piano) 2006
- A Spiritual Journey (SATB, jazz band, chamber orchestra) 1997
- Steal Away (SATB divisi) 1995
- String Quartet #1: Jewish Folk Fantasies 1986
- Sumervar (chamber orchestra) 1988
- Swing Low, Sweet Chariot (SATB divisi) 1994
- Swedish Lullaby (SATB, piano) 2012
- Syncopated Lady (piano) 1993
- Tagore's Lost Star (SATB divisi, harp) 2017
- Tirana (concert band) 2005
- A Tree Telling of Orpheus (SATB divisi) 2010
- Variations, Oh Yes! (clarinet, piano) 2008
- Variação (SATB divisi) 2000
- Verba Ultima (SATB, soprano sax) 1999
- Vignettes, After Pierides (flute, cello, piano) 2001
- Veni Sancte Spiritus (SATB divisi) 2005
- Voices (soprano, guitar) 1983
- We Clasp the Hands (SSA, piano) 2016
- Winter, Snow (SSA, piano) 2004
- Wonder Where (SATB divisi) 1996
- The World Beloved: A Bluegrass Mass (SATB, S/A/T soli, fiddle, mandolin, banjo, guitar, bass) 2006

Her music has been recorded and issued on CD, including:

- Mortals & Angels: A Bluegrass Te Deum CD (2017) VocalEssence
- Treasures from the Archive CD (September 9, 2014) Navona, ASIN: B00MHIKUSU
- Voices of Earth & Air: Works for Chorus CD (July 30, 2013) Navona, ASIN: B00DJSUNU2
- Choral Currents CD (June 1, 2011) Innova
- Zeitgeist: Here and Now CD (March 29, 2011) Innova
- Christmas a Cappella: Songs from Around the World CD (September 9, 2008) Cedille Records, ASIN: B001E1BO86
- The World Beloved: A Bluegrass Mass Audio CD (November 13, 2007) Clarion, ASIN: B000XLQGNQ
- Piccolo Four Hands CD (2007) Piccalota Productions
- Souvenirs De La France Profonde (Tour of Southwest France 2007) CD Yale Schola Cantorum, ASIN: B00G6SBM16
- Cyprus: First Impressions CD (July 2, 2006) Innova, ASIN: B000FFP0BY
- Harvest Home: Songs from the Heart CD (October 11, 2005) Gothic, ASIN: B000B8QFBY
- Christmas with the Dale Warland Singers CD (2002) Innova
- Cantate Hodie: Bach Choir of Pittsburgh CD (2002) Gothic
- Orchestral Miniatures: Volume V Contemporary American CD (May 30, 2000) Mmc Records, ASIN: B00004TV6E
- Syncopated Lady Audio CD (July 27, 1999) Capstone, ASIN: B00000JLD5
- My Soul’s Delight CD (August 1, 1998) Concordia Recordings, ASIN: B00005YB83
- Blue Wheat: A Harvest of American Folk Songs CD (Jan 1, 1996) Gothic
- Heartbeats: New songs from Minnesota for the AIDS Quilt Songbook CD (January 1, 1980) Innova, ASIN: B000004AFA
