= Janika Vandervelde =

American classical composer (born 1955)

- Born: Ripon, Wisconsin, U.S.
- Education: University of Wisconsin–Eau Claire; University of Minnesota
- Occupations: Composer; Educator; Pianist
- Known for: Choral compositions
- Notable work: O Viridissima Virga, Genesis II, Seven Sevens, Jack and the Beanstalk

Janika Vandervelde (born 1955) is an American composer, pianist, and music educator. Her work, notable for its feminist and ecological themes, has won numerous awards. Known for her music for orchestra, chorus, chamber ensembles and the stage, she also teaches composition.

== Biography ==
Janika Vandervelde was born in Ripon, Wisconsin, and grew up in nearby Green Lake, playing horn and piano starting at age five. She began composing in her teens. After undergraduate studies in music education at the University of Wisconsin–Eau Claire, she relocated to the Twin Cities of Minnesota, earning a doctorate in composition from the University of Minnesota (1985), where her teachers included Dominick Argento and Eric Stokes. She has taught intermittently at the University of Minnesota School of Music, and teaches regularly at Hamline University and at the Perpich Center for Arts Education, a residential high school for the arts in Golden Valley, Minnesota. Vandervelde is the author of Music by Kids for Kids, a composition curriculum designed for computer labs equipped with MIDI keyboards, published by the American Composers Forum. She was associate conductor of the Mississippi Valley Chamber Orchestra, and also served as music director at Wesley United Methodist Church in Minneapolis.

== Compositions ==
Vandervelde is known especially for her choral music, which has been commissioned and performed by groups such as Chanticleer, the Dale Warland Singers, and the Oregon Repertory Singers, and by conductors including Sir David Willcocks. She has composed more than 100 works for orchestra, choir, chamber ensembles, and soloists, as well as two operas, Hildegard (1989) and Seven Sevens (1993), and has written extensively for young audiences. Among the fruits of her three-year tenure as composer-in-residence for the Minnesota Chorale and two other Twin Cities organizations was Adventures of the Black Dot, a "choral storybook" for children, with story by Judy McGuire and staging by Kari Margolis. Recent projects include choral music for The Student, a collaboration with choreographer-director Vanessa Voskuil, and a 65-minute electronic soundscape for Diana Takes a Swim, a collaboration with dancer-choreographer Deborah Jinza Thayer. Vandervelde's work is published by Hothouse Press, earthsongs, Augsburg Fortress, Boosey & Hawkes, and Miela Harmonija.

== Reception ==
Vandervelde's music has been warmly received. She has been called "a passionate experimenter and ingenious explorer of new sonorities" and "a composer whose style reflects a freely inquisitive artistic personality." Most notably, the feminist musicologist Susan McClary argued that Vandervelde's piano trio "Genesis II moves metaphorically through a series of natural, cultural, and historical worldviews, holding them in tension and contradiction." McClary also argued that "Vandervelde's use of a rhythmically insistent but harmonically ambiguous academic minimalism [expresses] female embodiment and pleasure." McClary's feminist readings of Vandervelde's work, along with her readings of other composers, ignited a debate in musical criticism and scholarship. Genesis II (premiered and recorded by the Mirecourt Trio) is discussed at length in Take Note, an undergraduate music-appreciation textbook by musicologist Robin Wallace, published in 2014 by Oxford University Press; the work is part of the book's "core repertory."

== Awards ==
Vandervelde has won numerous awards for her work as a composer, including multiple Bush Artist Fellowships and McKnight Foundation Composer Fellowships. She is also a recipient of the Lili Boulanger Award from The Women's Philharmonic of San Francisco.
