= Ricardo Lorenz =

Ricardo Lorenz (born May 24, 1961) is a Venezuelan composer and academic.

== Life and career ==
Born in Maracaibo, Venezuela, Lorenz earned degrees from both the Conservatory of Music Juan Manuel Olivares and the Juan Manuel Olivares National School of Music (also known as the Venezuelan National Conservatory) in Caracas, Venezuela. He then pursued graduate studies in music composition under Juan Orrego-Salas and Donald Erb at Indiana University's Jacobs School of Music where he graduated with a Master of Music degree in 1986. He joined the faculty of the Jacobs School where he served as the director of the Latin American Music Center from 1987-1992. In 1995 he compiled and published the sourcebook Scores and Recordings at Indiana University's Latin American Music Center (Indiana University Press, 1995)

In 1992 Lorenz left the Jacobs school to pursue doctoral studies in music composition at the University of Chicago where he was a pupil of John Eaton and Shulamit Ran. After completing his PhD, he was a composer-in-residence with the Chicago Symphony Orchestra and Billings Symphony Orchestra. His works have been performed by symphony orchestras internationally.

In 2020 he was nominated for the Best Classical Contemporary Composition at the 21st Annual Latin Grammy Awards for his composition "Pataruco".

== Partial list of works ==
=== Orchestral works ===
- Sinfonietta Concertante (1987), for wind quintet and string orchestra; dedicated to Heitor Villa-Lobos
- Mar Acá, voor dwarsfluit, chamber orchestra and idiophones (1989)
- Piano concerto (1990)
- Violin concerto (1990)
- Confabulaciones del Alma, three symphonic études (1992)
- Concerto for Orchestra (1993)
- Entrada triunfal del Rey Magoberry (1995)
- Concerto for recorder and orchestra (1995, written for recorder player Aldo Abreu)
- Pataruco for Venezuelan maracas and orchestra (1999, written for percussionist Edward Harrison)
- Konex-Konex, for folk ensemble and orchestra (2000)
- En Tren Vá Changó (2001)
- Fantasía, for piano and orchestra (2002)
- Rumba Sinfónica, for Latin-American band and orchestra (2007)
- Canciones de Jara, concerto for viola and orchestra (2010)
- Habanera Science (2012)

=== Vocal music ===
- Delirio y descanso, for SATB chorus and orchestra (1984)
- Misericordia campana for soprano, piano, and electroacoustic music (1985)
- Sit still, SATB chorus, narrator, and chamber orchestra (1991)

=== Stage works ===
- La Última Lorcura, incidental music for the play (1986)
- La historia tropical, music for a dance work (1986)

=== Film scores ===
- Vanishing Borders (2014)
