= Teta (film) =

American short documentary film

- Film poster
- Directed by: Alexandra Hidalgo
- Written by: Alexandra Hidalgo
- Produced by: Alexandra Hidalgo
- Starring: Santiago Hidalgo-Bowler; William Hidalgo-Bowler; Alexandra Hidalgo; Antonieta Aagaard de Cardier
- Cinematography: Nathaniel Bowler
- Edited by: Alexandra Hidalgo
- Music by: Lena Miles
- Release date: March 2016 (East Lansing)
- Running time: 25 minutes
- Country: United States
- Language: English

Teta (lit. 'Tit') is a 2016 American short documentary film written, directed, and produced by Alexandra Hidalgo. The film premiered as part of a Cultural Rhetorics conference at Michigan State University in 2016. It also screened at the Capital City Film Festival, Boston Latino International Film Festival, and Cine Pobre Film Festival.

== Plot ==
A working mother (Alexandra Hidalgo) tells the story of nursing her youngest son, Santiago, for twenty-two months.

== Awards ==
- Won - Best Documentary Film Award at the 10th Jaipur International Film Festival, 2018
- Won - Honorable mention award at the United Latino Film Festival, 2017
- Won - Best documentary short film at Five Continents International Film Festival, 2017
