= Mary Ellen Childs =

American composer and multimedia artist

Mary Ellen Childs (born April 13, 1957 in Lafayette, Indiana) is an American composer and multimedia artist and founder of the ensemble Crash. She grew up as a dancer and writes music often influenced by dance rhythms. She currently administers the McKnight Artist Fellowships for Dance.

Her music is chiefly for small instrumental groups, especially for percussion, string groups or solo piano, and it usually has an essential theatrical or visual dimension. Her collaboration with accordionist Guy Klucevsek led to several works for that instrument. Her works have been widely performed by major ensembles, including a commission from the Kronos Quartet. Her 2007 recording of Dream House features the string quartet ETHEL. Reviews of her work have been published in newspapers nationwide, including The New York Times.

She is based in the twin city Minneapolis-St. Paul, Minnesota area.

== Discography ==
- Now (ECM, 2015)
- Kilter ("Powerhouse Pianists", AME 2015)
- Ephemeral Geometry (Documerica, Innova Recordings 2015)
- Wreck (Innova Recordings, 2013)
- Parterre ("Fantasy 'n' Symmetry", Performed by QNG, Genuine Recordings, 2012)
- Oa Poa Polka (Starkland Recordings, 2012)
- Farmstand Now Open (Opera America, 2012)
- Faint Object Camera (Here and Now, Innova Recordings, 2011)
- Chamberhouse (Dream House remixed, Sugarfoot Recordings)
- Dream House (Innova Recordings, 2007)
- Kilter (Experimental Intermedia, 1996)
- Bright Faces ("Choral Currents", Innova Recordings, 1991)
- Oa Poa Polka (Composers Recordings Inc, 1991)
- Parterre ("Open Boundaries", Innova Recordings, 1989
