= Rynning =

Rynning is a surname. Notable people with the surname include:

- Astri Rynning (1915–2006), Norwegian judge and politician
- Carl Ingwart Theodor Rynning (1837–1892), Norwegian government official and politician
- Chris Rynning (born 1967), Norwegian chief executive
- Jens Rynning (1778–1857), Norwegian priest and public education advocate
- Ole Rynning (1809–1838), Norwegian-born American emigrant pioneer and author
- Thomas H. Rynning (1866–1941), United States Army officer
