= Newell Weight =

American professor and choral conductor

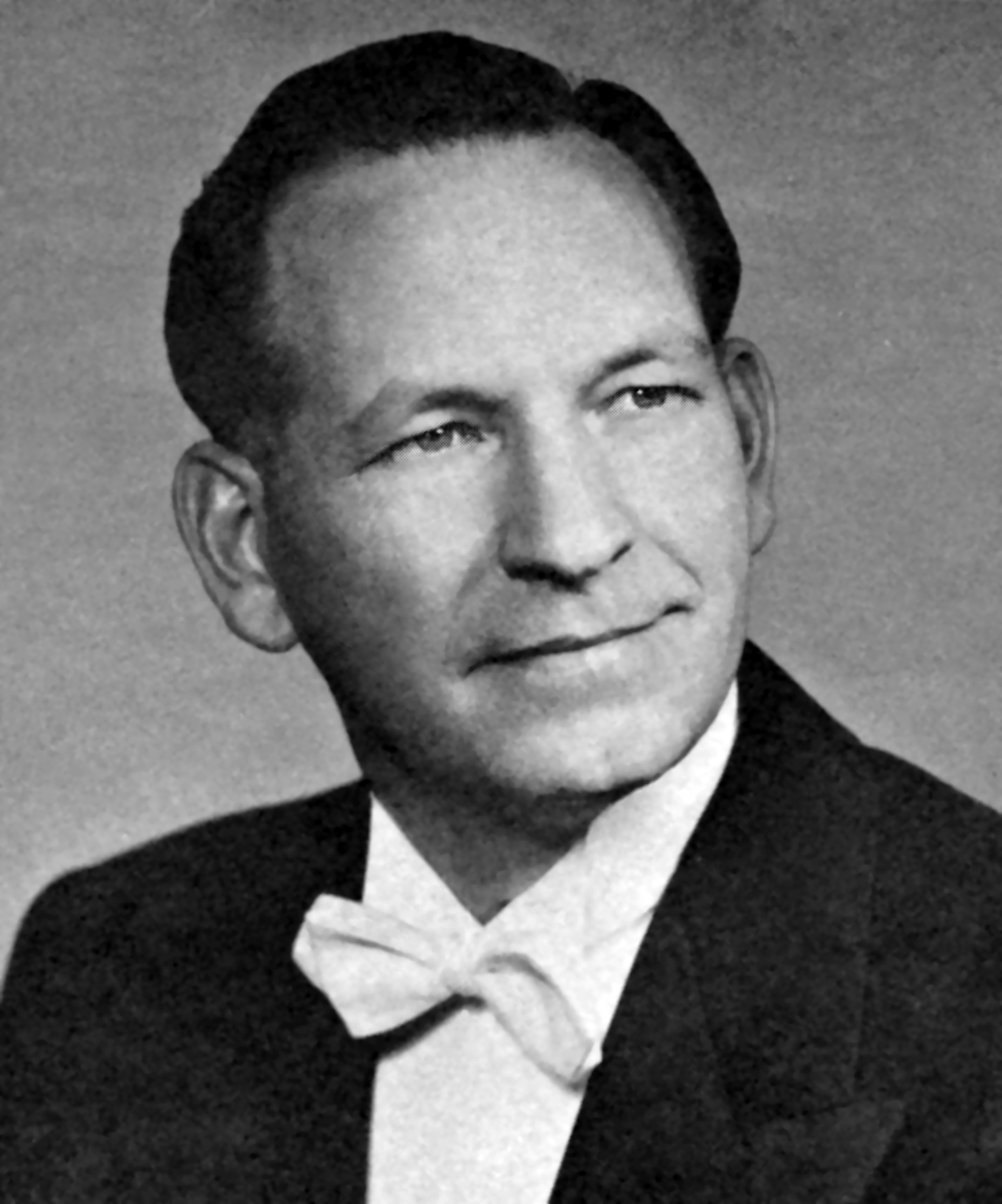
- Born: Newell Bryan Weight; August 1, 1916; Springville, Utah
- Died: July 12, 2009 (aged 92); Orem, Utah
- Occupations: Music professor and choir director

Newell Bryan Weight (August 1, 1916 – July 12, 2009), born in Springville, Utah, studied music at Brigham Young University and the University of South California. He was a professor of music at Brigham Young University from 1949 to 1962 and founded its a cappella choir. With this choir, he was able to record in commercial studios and go on national tours as the choir's popularity grew. He was later a professor at the University of Utah from 1962 until his retirement in 1984. There, he worked with established choirs, which were nominated for two Grammy awards. He also served as the chair of the University of Utah's Music Department. In his personal life, Weight married Dorothy Hill in 1936. The couple had six children. Weight also belonged to two clubs: the Good Sam's Club and the Golden Kiwanis Club. He died in Orem, Utah, at the age of 92.

== Early life ==
Newell Bryan Weight was born on August 1, 1916, in Springville, Utah. His parents were Ralph and Minerva Bryan Weight. He was married to Dorothy Hill on July 20, 1936, and later sealed to her in the Salt Lake Temple in 1939. They went on to have six children.

Weight attended Brigham Young University (BYU) and graduated with a master's degree in music education. He later graduated from the University of Southern California with a doctorate degree in music. Weight also studied choral techniques with Olaf Christiansen, a director of the St. Olaf Choir.

== Career ==
Weight began teaching at Provo High School in 1948; however, he moved to teach at BYU in 1949. While teaching at the university, he founded BYU's A Cappella Choir. When Weight began the choir, they accepted all applicants. As popularity grew and talent increased, the choir became more selective. By 1954, they had over 500 applicants and only accepted 70. The choir sang a variety of songs including contemporary music, plainchants, folk music, and sacred hymns. Under Weight's direction, the choir was "regarded by many critics as one of the finest in the nation." During his time at BYU, Weight worked with John R. Halliday. The BYU choir was also featured on "Colleges On the Air," a radio program from Mutual Broadcasting System, and made recordings in commercial studios.

Weight stayed at BYU until 1962 when he went to the University of Utah. Weight worked with their already established a cappella choir. The choirs he directed received two Grammy nominations. Weight became the chair of the Music Department. He retired from teaching in 1984, having taken many choirs from both universities on annual tours in the United States.

During his life, Weight was a member of the Good Sam's Club and the Golden Kiwanis Club. He was noted by music critics as "one of the nation's outstanding choral conductors". He died in Orem, Utah, on July 12, 2009.
