= Kenneth Jennings (conductor) =

American conductor (1925–2015)

Kenneth L. Jennings
- Born: May 13, 1925; Bridgeport, Connecticut
- Died: August 20, 2015 (aged 90); Northfield, Minnesota
- Occupations: Composer; Conductor

Kenneth L. Jennings (May 13, 1925 – August 20, 2015) was an American choral conductor and composer. He was the Harry R. and Thora Helseth Tosdal Professor of Music Emeritus and Director Emeritus of the St. Olaf Choir. He was a published arranger, composer, and choral music educator.

== Biography ==
Jennings grew up in Fairfield and Westport, Connecticut. He was an alumnus of St. Olaf College and sang as a member of the St. Olaf Choir. He received his master's degree from Oberlin College and his doctorate from the University of Illinois. Jennings was appointed to the faculty of St. Olaf College in 1953, and became the third director of the internationally renowned St. Olaf Choir in 1968, succeeding founder F. Melius Christiansen and his son-successor, Olaf Christiansen. He retired from St. Olaf College in 1990, turning over the podium to his former student, Anton Armstrong.

His wife, Carolyn Jennings, is also an emerita professor of music at St. Olaf. Among three children, his son, Mark Jennings, is currently director of Choral Activities at Truman State University in Kirksville, Missouri.

Jennings died at his home in Northfield, Minnesota, aged 90.

== Work as a conductor ==
Jennings became noted for guiding and maturing the St. Olaf Choir from an ensemble rooted substantially in its early twentieth century formation to ascend as ranking among the world's most highly respected choral ensembles. A former student and colleague of Olaf Christiansen, Jennings understood and respected the choir's distinct Lutheran tradition in his programming. However, as the third director of the ensemble, he also modified the tradition of programming exclusively unaccompanied music. Jennings prepared the choir to record Ravel's Daphnis et Chloé with the Minnesota Orchestra under the direction of Stanisław Skrowaczewski, and during his tenure, he arranged for several notable conductors to rehearse and lead the St. Olaf Choir in concert, including Polish composer Krzysztof Penderecki, Bach specialist Helmuth Rilling, British organist Simon Preston, and Robert Shaw. Jennings led the choir on twelve international tours, most notably to France (where he led the St. Olaf Choir, Strasbourg Philharmonic and international soloists in Bach's Mass in B minor for the opening concert of the 1972 Strasbourg International Music Festival), Norway (for the Bergen International Festival), and to Seoul, Korea, for the 1988 Summer Olympics Arts Festival.

After his retirement from St. Olaf in 1990, he served as a visiting professor and choral conductor at Gustavus Adolphus College and the University of Arizona in Tucson. Jennings served as the guest conductor at anniversary concerts in honor of F. Melius Christiansen (the 125th in 1996 and the 135th in 2006).

== Publications ==
N.B.: These lists may not be complete. Some works may be out of print or available only as print-on-demand or online downloads.

=== Compositions ===
Jennings was known for writing choral works for advanced choirs. His writing is marked by the efficient part-writing, harmonies, and attention given to the meaning of the text.

- Agnus Dei (Augsburg-Fortress) – From the Augsburg-Fortress website: "What could be more hauntingly beautiful than Edward Elgar's Nimrod (Variation IX) from the Enigma Variations? Kenneth Jennings, director emeritus of the St. Olaf Choir, set the Agnus Dei text to Elgar's beautiful melody in this edition for SATB choir. This moving work was featured on the St. Olaf Choir's national tour."
- All You Works of the Lord (Augsburg-Fortress) – John Ferguson calls this "one of the greatest pieces written for choir in the late 20th Century and stands up there with Benjamin Britten's Jubilate Deo." Recorded by The Calvin College Alumni Choir (Anton Armstrong, cond.).
- American Indian Songs (Walton Music Pub.) – Originally conceived as a pedagogical tool for training young conductors, this work is also suitable for performance. In seven short movements, but intended to be performed as a single unit (entire work lasts only about 5 minutes). Texts, translated into English, are from several different Native American tribes.
- And Death Shall Have No Dominion (Neil A. Kjos Music Co.) – This is the second of 'Two Laments on Dylan Thomas', the first being "Do Not Go Gentle Into That Good Night". Recorded by Cantus on their CD ...Against the Dying of the Light. Included in the Cantus Choral Series.
- Antiphon (from Spiritual Songs) (Earthsongs)
- Arise, Shine, for Thy Light Has Come (Augsburg-Fortress) – Available only via download
- Blessed Are You, O Lord Our God (Hope Publishing Co. #FPC129) – The Fourth Presbyterian Church of Chicago Anthem Series
- The Call: Come, My Way, My Truth, My Life (from Spiritual Songs) (Earthsongs)
- Calm On the Listening Ear of Night (Walton Music Pub.) – Included in the Dale Warland Choral Series
- Christ is Arisen-Easter Fanfare (Augsburg-Fortress) – SATB and 3 trumpets
- Discipline: Throw Away Thy Rod (from Spiritual Songs) (Earthsongs)
- Do Not Go Gentle Into That Good Night (Neil A. Kjos Music Co.) – Included in the Cantus Choral Series. This is the first of 'Two Laments on Dylan Thomas', the second being "And Death Shall Have No Dominion". Recorded by Cantus on their CD ...Against the Dying of the Light.
- Festival Alleluia (Schmitt Music, dist. Belwin) – SATB and brass or organ.
- The Lord is the Everlasting God (Mark Foster Music Co., dist. Shawnee) – In two parts. Commissioned by Luther College in honor of 50 years of service by Weston H. Noble
- Love: Love Bade Me Welcome (from Spiritual Songs) (Earthsongs)
- The Moon Is a Spoon (Palma, dist. Kjos) – SSA
- Noel: Christmas Eve, 1913 (Neil A. Kjos Music Co. #8979) – Included in Bradley Ellingboe's Music for the Church Year series. Sacred, Christmas & Christmastide. For SATB and viola. Recorded by The St. Olaf Choir (Anton Armstrong, cond.).
- O Little Town of Bethlehem (Augsburg) – Original tune by KJ to the traditional words. Part of the St. Olaf Choir Series.
- Praise: King of Glory, King of Peace (from Spiritual Songs) (Earthsongs)
- Prayer: Prayer, the Churches Banquet (from Spiritual Songs) (Earthsongs)
- The Pulley: When God at First Made Man (from Spiritual Songs) (Earthsongs)
- Spirit of God, Descend Upon My Heart – Text by George Croly. Recorded by the National Lutheran Choir (Larry L. Fleming, cond.).
- Spiritual Songs (Earthsongs Pub.) – A collection of eight anthems (each published separately) on George Herbert texts. Movements are: 1. Discipline: Throw Away Thy Rod; 2. Love: Love Bade Me Welcome; 3. Prayer: Prayer, the Churches Banquet; 4. The Pulley: When God at First Made Man; 5. Praise: King of Glory, King of Peace; 6. Virtue: Sweet Day, So Calm, So Cool; 7. Antiphon: Let All the World in Every Corner Sing; 8. The Call: Come, My Way, My Truth, My Life. Included in the Anton Armstrong Choral Series. – Recorded by Magnum Chorum (Christopher Aspaas, cond.)
- Spring Carol (Palma, dist. Kjos) – SSA
- Summer in Winter Carol (Curtis Music Press) – SATB
- Thee Will I Love (Neil A. Kjos Music Co. #8724) – Recorded by the National Lutheran Choir (Larry L. Fleming, cond.).
- Thy Bountiful Care (Curtis Music Press, dist. Neil A. Kjos Music Co. #C8900)
- Today, Heaven Sings (Mark Foster Music Co., dist. Shawnee) – Recorded by The St. Olaf Choir (Kenneth Jennings, cond.) and The Concordia Choir (René Clausen, cond.). Available now only for print on demand. SATB div.
- Two Laments on Dylan Thomas (Neil A. Kjos Music Co.) – Each of the two movements are published separately, and are each included in the Cantus Choral Series. The two movements are 1. "Do Not Go Gentle Into That Good Night"; 2. "And Death Shall Have No Dominion". Recorded by Cantus on their CD ... Against the Dying of the Light.
- Virtue: Sweet Day, So Calm, So Cool (from Spiritual Songs) (Earthsongs) – From the back cover: "In this poem, endings that occur inevitably in nature are contrasted with the virtuous soul. Day falls into night, the rose fades with time, Spring comes to an end, and music, George Herbert's particular love and delight, also has its cadences ("closes") or endings. In the final stanza we become aware that the poem, patterned on a carpe diem ("seize the day!") secular genre, is really a spiritual allegory. Unlike the world of the natural order, only the virtuous soul, like stalwart "seasoned timber" survives the final conflagration. Sing the phrases, mostly eight measures in length, as long sweeping musical arcs moving to and from the high point at the middle of each line. Savor the sound and meanings of each word. Tempo should move along comfortably."
- What Sweeter Music Can We Bring (Santa Barbara Music Press) – Commissioned by the Rochester Choral Arts Ensemble (Rick Kvam, cond.). Part of the Matthew and Michael Culloton Choral Series
- With a Voice of Singing (Augsburg-Fortress) – Recorded by Magnum Chorum (Christopher Aspaas, cond.)

=== Arrangements ===
- Arirang (Neil A. Kjos Music Co.) – Korean, arr. KJ.
- Deck The Halls (Neil A. Kjos Music Co. #6212) – Welsh Wassail, arr. KJ. For SSA/2 Part/Unison.
- Joy to the World (Neil A. Kjos Music Co. #6213) – Handel, arr. KJ
- The Lord My Faithful Shepherd Is (Augsburg-Fortress) – Bach, ed. KJ. For SATB, Organ.
- Norge Mitt Norge (Earthsongs) – arr. KJ
- O Tannenbaum (O Christmas Tree) (Neil A. Kjos Music Co. #6211) – German carol, arr. KJ
- Rise Up, O Men of God (Augsburg-Fortress) – Hymn, arr. KJ. TTBB.
- Silent Night (Neil A. Kjos Music Co. #6214) – German carol by Franz Gruber, arr. KJ
- Thy Little Ones, Dear Lord, Are We (Curtis Music Press, dist. Neil A. Kjos Music Co.)
- Toraji Taryung (Neil A. Kjos Music Co. #8842) – Korean, arr. KJ.

=== Editions ===
- For God Commanded Angels to Watch Over You (Neil A. Kjos Music Co. #8798) – From Mendelssohn's oratorio, Elijah, ed. KJ
- Four Double Choruses by Robert Schumann, Op 141 (G. Schirmer) – ed. and trans. KJ. Includes An die Sterne, Ungewisses Licht, Zuversicht, and Talismane.
- Gently the Wind is Blowing (Curtis Music Press, dist. Neil A. Kjos Music Co.) – Mozart, ed./arr. KJ
- I Gondolieri (Hinshaw) – Rossini, ed. with a singable English translation by KJ. SATB, Piano.
- La Passeggiata (Hinshaw) – Rossini, ed. with a singable English translation by KJ. SATB, Piano.
- Sommersalm (The Earth Adorned) (Walton Music Co.) – Waldemar Åhlen, English translation by KJ

=== Other publications ===
- Sing Legato (Neil A. Kjos Music Co.) – Unison vocal studies designed for choruses, individual voice students, and vocal classes. The vocalises are set as short songs emphasizing basic aspects of singing. Various areas covered are: articulation (exercises for legato, staccato, marcato), tone, gradual crescendo/decrescendo, and vocal flexibility. Book also includes songs to teach all melodic intervals up to an octave.
- Augsburg Choir Book (Augsburg-Fortress) – A large anthology of anthems

== Discography (conductor) ==
- At the Ordway Music Theatre – From the St. Olaf Records website: "This album was recorded live...at the magnificent Ordway Music Theatre in St. Paul, Minnesota. The concert commemorated the 300th anniversary of the births of J.S. Bach & Heinrich Schutz."
- Beautiful Savior (rec. 1974–1985, released 1991) – Live selections by The St. Olaf Choir from a number of years.
- Born A Child and Yet a King – Volume II of Christmas Festival albums featuring Jennings and other conductors
- The F. Melius Christiansen 125th Anniversary Concert (1996) – Jennings conducted the last three pieces of this historic event, combining the college choirs of Augsburg, Concordia (Moorhead), Gustavus Adolphus, Luther, and St. Olaf. Recorded live.
- Go Tell It On the Mountain – Volume V of Christmas Festival albums featuring Jennings and other conductors. Video from this festival was broadcast for television.
- Out of Darkness, Let Light Shine – Volume IV of Christmas Festival albums featuring Jennings and other conductors
- Portrait of the Orient (1986) – Recorded live by The St. Olaf Choir during that choir's tour of the United States, Japan, Taiwan, and China.
- Reflections of Norway (1980) – Recorded live in The Grieg Hall by The St. Olaf Choir at the Bergen International Festival in Norway.
- Seoul Olympic Arts Festival – From the St. Olaf Records website: "An invitation to participate in the Seoul Olympic Arts Festival in Seoul, Korea, came as a spectacular honor to the St. Olaf Choir and director Kenneth Jennings . One of only five choirs in the world to be so honored, the St. Olaf Choir participated." A double-CD set.
- Sing for Joy – From the St. Olaf Records website: "Songs for Christmas and "New Songs of Love" by Brahms."
- What Child Is This – Volume III of Christmas Festival albums featuring Jennings and other conductors. Video from this festival was broadcast for television.
- Wonder Anew – Volume I of Christmas Festival albums featuring Jennings and other conductors. Video from this festival was broadcast for television.

== Legacy ==
In addition to his music publications and recordings, Kenneth Jennings was the teacher and mentor of many prominent choral conductors, most notably René Clausen, composer, and conductor of The Concordia Choir; Anton Armstrong, his successor as conductor of the St. Olaf Choir; Craig Arnold, founder, artistic director, and Chair of Manhattan Concert Productions and former conductor of Luther College's Nordic Choir; Bradley Ellingboe, composer and Director of Choral Studies for University of New Mexico; John Helgen, composer; and Craig Hella Johnson, conductor.

== Sources ==
- St. Olaf Choir Website
- St. Olaf Records
- The Neil A. Kjos Music Co.
- Earthsongs Music Publishing
