= Magnum Chorum =

- Choir
- Origin: Minneapolis, Minnesota, United States
- Founded: 1991; 35 years ago
- Genre: Choral
- Artistic Director: Dwight Jilek
- Website: www.magnumchorum.org

Magnum Chorum is a choral ensemble based in the Twin Cities of Minnesota. Magnum Chorum performs sacred choral music in cathedrals and sanctuaries throughout the Midwest. The 65 voice auditioned choir presents concerts, commissions new sacred works, makes recordings, and provides music for worship. Founded in 1991 in the choral tradition of St. Olaf College, membership was originally limited to St. Olaf graduates, but since 2005, auditions are open to singers devoted to excellence in choral music. Magnum Chorum’s name is intended to convey the importance of the choir in expressing the divine and infinite through voice, music, and text.

Magnum Chorum has collaborated with numerous composers including Stephen Paulus, Kenneth Jennings, Frank Ferko, Libby Larsen, Ralph M. Johnson, J. Aaron McDermid, Eric Barnum, Robert Morris and Eric Sayre. The choir has appointed three Composers-in-Residence including Stanford Scriven, Benjamin Simmons, and Paul John Rudoi. Magnum Chorum has performed with conductors such as Anton Armstrong, Craig Arnold, René Clausen, Allen Hightower, Kenneth Jennings, Craig Hella Johnson, Sigrid Johnson, Weston Noble, Matthew Olson, Sandra Peters, Brian Schmidt, Osmo Vänskä, and Dale Warland. The ensemble has been featured at conferences of the American Choral Director’s Association, Chorus America, College Music Society, American Guild of Organists, and American Hymn Society. Broadcasts of the choir’s 8 recordings have been heard in the U.S. and Canada on public radio and classical music stations.

Magnum Chorum has served as Choir in Residence at Westwood Lutheran Church in St. Louis Park, Minnesota from 2005-2014 and from 2016 to present.

Magnum Chorum was founded in 1991 by three St. Olaf College graduates, including Jin Kim, the choir's Founding Music Director from 1991-1994. David Dickau conducted the choir from 1994-2007, during which time the ensemble released four recordings including "Wonder Tidings: Christmas Music of Stephen Paulus" (2001), and appeared at national and regional choral conferences. For the 2007-2008 season, Ralph M. Johnson was named interim Music Director, and Christopher Aspaas was named guest conductor. In 2008, Christopher Aspaas was appointed Artistic Director and he served until 2013. The ensemble produced two recordings under the direction of Christopher Aspaas, including "Love Divine" (2009) and "With a Voice of Singing: The Music of Kenneth Jennings" (2012). Guest conductors during the 2013-2014 season included Craig Arnold, Mark Stover, Allen Hightower, and Anton Armstrong, In 2014, Mark Stover was appointed Artistic Director. Under Mark Stover's direction, Magnum Chorum released the live recordings "Requiem: I Will Lift Mine Eyes" (2015) and "My Song in the Night" (2016). Guest conductors led the 2017-2018 season including Brian Schmidt, Sigrid Johnson, Sandra Peter and Matthew Olson. In 2018, Dr. Dwight Jilek was named Artistic Director of the ensemble, and in 2019, Karen Lutgen was named Associate Conductor.
