= Dejlig er jorden =

Nordic Christmas hymn by Bernhard Severin Ingemann

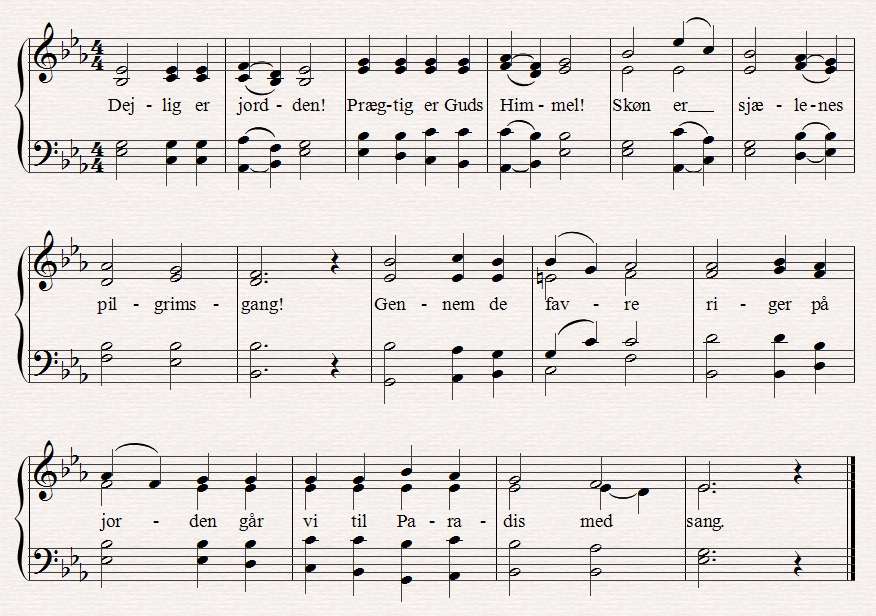
- Tune and first stanza of the Danish hymn 'Dejlig er jorden'.
- English: The earth is (so) beautiful
- Other name: Pilgrimssang
- Year: 1850
- Occasion: Christmas
- Language: Danish, Faroese, Finnish, Kven, Norwegian, Saami and Swedish
- Melody: Schlesische Volkslieder mit ihren Melodien
- Duration: 2 minutes

"Dejlig er jorden" (Danish: Dejlig er jorden/Pilgrimssang, Finnish: Maa on niin kaunis, Faroese: Føgur er foldin, Norwegian: Deilig er jorden, Swedish: Härlig är jorden, Estonian: Maa on nii kaunis, transl. The earth is (so) beautiful) is a Nordic religious hymn. The hymn is usually sung during Christmas.

== Origins ==
The hymn has origins from Silesia and Germany, and the melody is derived from the hymn Schönster Herr Jesu, or "Fairest Lord Jesus" in English. It was published by August Heinrich Hoffmann von Fallersleben under the collection "Schlesische Volkslieder mit ihren Melodien" in 1842, and the hymn is thought to have origins from pilgrims on their travel to Jerusalem.

The melody was used by Danish hymn-writer Bernhard Severin Ingemann in 1850, following the request of his friend, Ferdinand Fenger to write words to the melody. The hymn was originally named Pilgrimssang (transl. Pilgrim's song), by Ingermann. However the opening verse stuck around as the colloquial name of the hymn.

== Usage ==
The hymn is a famous Christmas hymn in the Nordic countries. The hymn is available in most native languages of the Nordic countries, including Danish, Norwegian, Finnish, Estonian, Swedish and Faroese, Icelandic, Kven, Northern Sami and Southern Sami. The hymn is traditionally sung during Christmas Eve, however is sometimes sung at funerals in Denmark. In Sweden the hymn is primarily used in funeral, usually as the closing song.

The most notable English adaptation of the hymn is that of Norwegian-American composer and choral director, F. Melius Christiansen. Christiansen's setting of the hymn, titled Beautiful Savior, was composed for The St. Olaf Choir, which F. Melius founded, and remains the choir's flagship piece to this day.

== Text ==
Deilig er jorden, prektig er Guds himmel, skjønn er sjelenes pilgrimsgang. Gjennom de fagre riker på jorden går vi til paradis med sang.

Tider skal komme, tider skal henrulle, slekt skal følge slekters gang. Aldri forstummer tonen fra himlen i sjelens glade pilgrimssang.

Englene sang den, først for markens hyrder; skjønt fra sjel til sjel det lød. Fred over jorden, menneske fryd deg. Oss er en evig Frelser født.
