= St. John's Lutheran Church (Northfield, Minnesota) =

Coordinates: 44°27′28″N 93°10′1″W

- St. John's Lutheran Church (Northfield, Minnesota)
- Location: Northfield, Minnesota, United States

History
- Founded: Founded in 1869

St. John's Lutheran Church is a Lutheran church in Northfield, Minnesota, United States.

== History ==
Founded in 1869, the church has shared a close relationship with St. Olaf College. The famous St. Olaf Choir first started at St. John's. The church was founded by a Norwegian Lutheran minister, Bernt Julius Muus, who founded several other churches as well as St. Olaf College.

St. John's is a member of the Evangelical Lutheran Church in America.

== Mission ==
The St. John's mission statement reads:

"Created, renewed, and empowered by God’s grace, Saint John’s Lutheran Church is a welcoming community in Christ that celebrates in Word and Sacrament God’s gracious actions in the world, cultivates growth in faith, encourages service and witness and proclaims Christ as the hope of the world."
