= Wilse =

Wilse is a surname. Notable people with the surname include:

- Anders Beer Wilse (1865–1949), Norwegian photographer
- Jacob Nicolai Wilse (1736–1801), Norwegian writer and meteorologist
- Liv Wilse (1931–1994), Norwegian actress and singer
