= Anton Armstrong =

American conductor (born 1956)

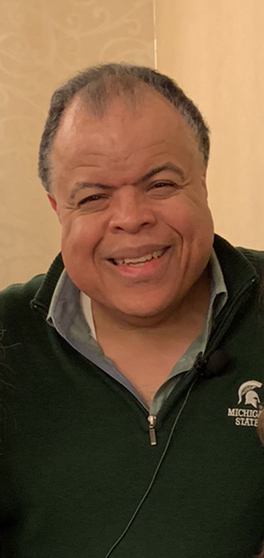
- Armstrong in 2019

Background information
- Born: Anton Eugene Armstrong; April 26, 1956 (age 69)
- Genres: Choral music
- Occupations: Music editor Conductor

Anton Eugene Armstrong (born April 26, 1956) is the conductor of the St. Olaf Choir as well as the Harry R. and Thora H. Tosdal Professor of Music at St. Olaf College of Northfield, Minnesota, in the United States. Armstrong became the fourth director of the St. Olaf Choir in 1990, continuing the tradition begun by the choir's founder F. Melius Christiansen in 1911, sustained and developed by his son, Olaf Christiansen, and strengthened and enhanced by Kenneth Jennings. Armstrong teaches conducting in the Sacred Music department at Luther Seminary and also conducts some pieces in "Northfield Youth Choirs".

== Early life ==
Anton was born in New York City on April 26, 1956, to William Benfield Armstrong (1916–2002) and Esther Louise Holder (1917–2007). William was born in Antigua, and Esther was born in New York City to Herbert Henry Holder (1887–1973) and Leander Hassell (1890–1945), both from St Thomas. Armstrong grew up on Long Island where he and his mother were active singers in a local church choir. Armstrong joined the American Boychoir, based in Princeton, New Jersey. According to Armstrong, "That experience lit my fire for choral singing."

Armstrong earned his bachelor's degree at St. Olaf College, graduating in 1978. He was a member of the St. Olaf Choir from 1976 to 1978, under the leadership of Kenneth Jennings. Jennings became a mentor to Armstrong and 12 years after graduating from St. Olaf, Armstrong replaced Jennings as director of the St. Olaf Choir.

== Career ==
Armstrong was invited to conduct the Masterwork Festival Chorus's performance of Robert Ray's Gospel Mass at Carnegie Hall on March 18, 2019. He was also the conductor of several All-State Honor Choirs across more than 40 states, most recently being the 2022 Kansas Music Educators Association All-State Mixed Choir.

In March 2024, Armstrong was the guest conductor for the Manassas Chorale's annual "Voices United" concert.

Armstrong served two terms as president of the Choristers Guild and has led numerous webinars and given lectures for Choristers Guild over the past decades.
