= Fairest Lord Jesus =

1677 Christian hymn

- by Anonymous
- Native name: Schönster Herr Jesu
- Genre: Hymn
- Meter: 8.8.4.4.8.8 with refrain
- Melody: Crusaders' Hymn
- Composed: 1677; 349 years ago

"Fairest Lord Jesus", also known as "Beautiful Savior" or "Crusader's Hymn", is a Christian hymn. It was originally a hymn in German first printed in 1677, "Schönster Herr Jesu".

== History ==
According to some accounts, it was called "Crusader's Hymn" because it was sung by German Crusaders as they made their way to the Holy Land. But William Jensen Reynolds dismisses as "completely erroneous" any association of this hymn with the Crusades. The words may have originated in the Jesuit Order, which came into being after the Crusades. The words were first printed in a Münster Gesangbuch of 1677, a Roman Catholic hymnbook. It must have become popular, in the manner of a folk-song, because it was recorded in 1839 by August Heinrich Hoffmann von Fallersleben in the district of Glatz in Silesia. With Ernst Friedrich Richter, Hoffmann von Fallersleben edited a collection of Silesian folk-songs, Schlesische Volkslieder, in which the hymn appeared with its matching tune.

The tune emerges in Franz Liszt's oratorio Legend of Saint Elizabeth—wherein the tune forms part of the "Crusader's March"—but no evidence of the tune exists prior to 1842, when the hymn appeared in Schlesische Volkslieder.

The melody of the song was used in the Swedish power metal band Sabaton's 2021 single "The Royal Guard."

It was incorporated into the song "Eatnemen Vuelie" composed by Frode Fjellheim which was altered for the opening musical number of 2013 animated film Frozen.

The most famous English arrangement of the hymn titled "Beautiful Savior" was composed by F. Melius Christiansen in 1919 and serves as the flagship choral anthem of The St. Olaf Choir to this day.

The hymn was also played when US President George H. W. Bush’s casket was carried up the steps of the US Capitol Rotunda on 3 December 2018.

== Melody ==
The tune, originally a Silesian folk song, and the German text were printed together for the first time in 1842 by Hoffmann von Fallersleben and Richter under the name Schönster Herr Jesu (Most beautiful Lord Jesus).

It was arranged by Richard Storrs Willis for his collection Church Chorals and Choir Studies in 1850. The Danish hymnwriter B. S. Ingemann wrote Dejlig er jorden, which he set to the same melody during that year. An English translation by Jens C. Aaberg was published as Fair Is Creation. Apart from their musical setting, the Danish and German lyrics are unrelated.

A Greenlandic version of the melody exists. It is primarily used on Christmas Day services and is titled 'Qaammarpoq nuna' (The Earth has been enlightened), and has been arranged by Haldur F. Jørgensen.

== Lyrics ==
1873 translation by Joseph A. Seiss

Fairest Lord Jesus, Ruler of all nature,
O Thou of God and man the Son,
Thee will I cherish, Thee will I honor,
Thou, my soul’s glory, joy and crown
Beautiful Savior! Lord of all the nations!
Son of God and Son of Man!
Glory and honor, praise, adoration,
Now and forever more be Thine.
