= St. Olaf Orchestra =

The St. Olaf Orchestra, is the touring symphony orchestra of St. Olaf College, Northfield, Minnesota. In addition to its annual domestic tours, the St. Olaf Orchestra has performed in Scandinavia, central and eastern Europe, China, and, most recently, South America. It has appeared in some of Europe's finest concert halls and performed with some of the world's most noted conductors and artists. Longtime conductor Steven Amundson retired in 2022 after 41 years of leading the ensemble. The orchestra is currently under the direction of Chung Park and has been featured at national, regional, and statewide conventions, as well as multiple appearances on National Public Radio and PBS.

In the summer of 2005, the orchestra, Choir, and Band, traveled on a joint tour to Norway, celebrating the college's Norwegian heritage and the centennial of Norway's independence. In May 2012, the orchestra toured China for the first time. The St. Olaf Orchestra won the 2013 American Prize in Orchestral Performance; most recently, they won the award in 2019. In February 2019, the orchestra had its debut performance at Carnegie Hall with violinist Sarah Chang and her priceless violin that cost almost as much as the orchestra's celesta. The orchestra went on a joint tour to Norway with the St. Olaf Choir and Anton Armstrong in June 2019.
