= List of compositions by F. Melius Christiansen =

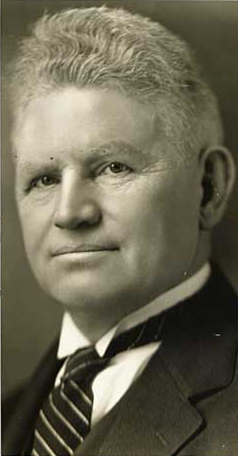
F. Melius Christiansen ca. 1926

This is a list of original compositions by F. Melius Christiansen, though he also published a textbook, School of Choir Singing, collections of other composers' compositions, and choral arrangements. Augsburg Publishing House published 263 individual works in the St. Olaf Series between 1919 and 1948.

== Works by genre ==
Choral (a partial list)

- All My Heart
- Beautiful Savior
- Beauty in Humility
- Behold a Host, Arrayed in White
- Built on a Rock
- Celestial Spring: A Motet in Four Movements - composed in 1930
  1. The Spirit's Yearning
  2. Exaltation
  3. Regeneration
  4. Glorification
- The Christmas Symbol
- From Grief to Glory - composed in 1936
  - Verse I. Decadence
  - Verse II. Love in Grief
  - Verse III. Spring Returns
  - Verse IV. Life
- How Fair the Church of Christ Shall Stand
- Lamb of God, Chorale 1540
- Lost in the Night
- Lullaby on Christmas Eve
- O Bread of Life
- O Day Full of Grace
- O Sacred Head
- Praise to the Lord
- Prodigal Son - 1918
- Psalm 33 in Four Movements
  1. Sing Unto Him
  2. Behold the Eye of Jehovah
  3. All Glory Be to Thee
  4. Blessed Is the Nation
- Psalm 50 - composed for the St. Olaf Choir in 1922
  1. The mighty God
  2. Offer unto God
  3. Whoso offereth praise (Sometimes titled, "Doxology")
- Reformation Cantata
- The Spires
- Today There is Ringing
- Wake, Awake
- When Curtained Darkness Falls
