= Ole Rynning =

Norwegian emigrant pioneer and author

Ole Rynning (April 4, 1809 – September 1838) was a Norwegian emigrant pioneer and author.

Rynning was born in the prestegjeld of Ringsaker in Hedmark county, Norway. He was the son of the priest Jens Rynning (1778–1857) and the uncle of Bernt Julius Muus (1832–1900), who helped found St. Olaf College in Northfield, Minnesota. Rynning emigrated to the United States, where he was instrumental in helping establish the first Norwegian emigrant colony there. In 1838, Rynning published the book Sandfærdig Beretning om Amerika til Oplysning og Nytte for Bonde og Menigmand. Forfattet af en Norsk, som kom derover i Juni Maaned 1837 (A True Report on America for the Enlightenment and Benefit of Farmers and the Common Man. Authored by a Norwegian That Came Over in June 1837). Popularly known as Amerika-boka (The America Book), the volume was influential in encouraging Norwegian emigration to the United States. Rynning's book also describes the first Norwegian emigrant voyage on the sloop Restauration.

Rynning died during a malaria epidemic at the Beaver Creek colony, near what is now Beaverville, Illinois.
