= Bernt Julius Muus =

Norwegian-American Lutheran minister and church leader

- Born: March 15, 1832; Snåsa Municipality, Norway
- Died: May 25, 1900 (aged 68); Trondheim, Norway
- Education: University of Christiania
- Spouse: Oline Pind (m. 1859; div. 1883)
- Children: 3

Bernt Julius Muus (March 15, 1832 – May 25, 1900) was a Norwegian-American Lutheran minister and church leader. He helped found St. Olaf College, a private liberal arts college in Northfield, Minnesota.

== Biography ==
=== Early life and education ===
Muus was born in the parish of Snaasen in Throndhjems Stift in what is now Snåsa Municipality in Trøndelag county, Norway. He was the grandson of the priest Jens Rynning and the nephew of the emigrant author Ole Rynning. Having graduated from the Latin school of Trondheim in 1849, he entered the University of Christiania where he studied theology and completed his theological training in 1854. He immigrated to the United States in 1859.

=== Career ===
Muus was the first resident pastor of Holden Lutheran Church in Kenyon, Minnesota. During a forty-year ministry, Muus traveled indefatigably to establish and minister to congregations in southern Minnesota. Muus also founded St. John's Lutheran Church in Northfield, Minnesota, Fox Lake Lutheran Church in Rice County, Minnesota and many other churches in southern Minnesota.

Muus filled the office of bishop of the Minnesota District of the Norwegian Synod, took an active part in theological disputes, and ceaselessly urged the church to do more in the field of education. In 1874, Muus led a group of Norwegian-American immigrant pastors and farmers to found St. Olaf College in Northfield, Minnesota. St. Olaf College is a residential, four-year private liberal arts college affiliated with the Evangelical Lutheran Church in America.

Despite his substantial achievements, Muus was considered a "fascinating, capable, but flawed leader." During the Predestination Controversy (naadevalgsstriden), where The Norwegian Synod experienced internal division over questions concerning predestination and conversion, Muus sided with Anti-Missourian Brotherhood. Muus' uncompromising nature and stubbornness eventually resulted in his expulsion from his church in 1898 for failure to conform to doctrine.

=== Illness, return to Norway and death ===
In 1899, Muus resigned as a pastor after having suffered a stroke and was stricken with partial paralysis. He returned to Norway in 1899, where he died on May 25, 1900.

== Personal life ==
Muus married Oline Pind from Fet Municipality in 1859. The two had three children, Nils (1863–1932), Jens Ingebrigt Rynning (1866–1878), and Paul Johan Elster (1872–1890). Jens died of typhus at the age of twelve.

Oline Muus

=== Divorce ===
After a lengthy and highly publicised legal battle, Pind was granted a limited divorce on January 20, 1883. She received $150 per year for ten years as alimony. Bernt was given custody of the children, who were still minors. Divorce in Minnesota's nineteenth century Norwegian-Lutheran community was a rarity. Legal separation between a leading pastor and his wife was unheard of. The 1879 court case in Holden Township led to both those outcomes, and triggered a public debate about married women's legal rights.

== See also ==
- Muus v. Muus

== Related Reading ==
- Nelson, E. Clifford; Fevold, Eugene L. (1960) The Lutheran Church among Norwegian-Americans: a history of the Evangelical Lutheran Church (Augsburg Publishing House)
- Shaw, Joseph M. (1999) Bernt Julius Muus: Founder of St. Olaf College (Norwegian-American Historical Association) ISBN 0-87732-088-8
- Holand, Hjalmar (2006) History of the Norwegian Settlements (Astri My Astri Publishing) ISBN 978-0-9760541-1-5
