= Peder Harboe Hertzberg =

- Born: July 4, 1728
- Died: January 1, 1802 (aged 73)
- Occupations: Priest, farmer, economist
- Children: Niels Hertzberg

Peder Harboe Hertzberg (July 4, 1728 – January 1, 1802) was a Norwegian priest best known for his efforts in educating the public during the introduction of potato cultivation in Norway.

Hertzberg was the son of the parish priest Niels Jensen Hertzberg (1693–1764) and Dorothea Cathrine Harboe (c. 1695–1743). He served as a representative at the first session of the Storting in 1814. He was the father of the priest and politician Niels Hertzberg and the grandfather of the theologian, educator, and politician Nils Christian Egede Hertzberg.

== See also ==
- Potato priest
