= Muus v. Muus =

- Court: Minnesota District Court; Minnesota Supreme Court
- Full case name: Oline christine kathrine Muus vs. Bernt J. Muus
- Decided: 1879 (District); May 5, 1882 (Supreme)

Muus v. Muus was an 1879 court case in Holden Township, Goodhue County, Minnesota. Divorce in Minnesota's nineteenth century Norwegian-Lutheran community was a rarity. Legal separation between a leading pastor and his wife was unheard of. But an 1879 court case in Holden Township led to both those outcomes, and triggered a public debate about married women's legal rights.

== Background ==
Oline Muus

In summer 1859, Lutheran minister Bernt Julius Muus and his wife Oline arrived in Goodhue County's Holden Township. Muus was to serve Lutherans in Holden, located north of Kenyon in the midst of a growing Norwegian American community. Bernt and Oline had married in Norway shortly before their departure for America. Muus, born in 1832, was six years older than his bride. An honors graduate of the University of Christiania, he came from a line of leading Norwegian clergymen.

Oline Pind Muus's family was part of Norway's upper class. She received an excellent education. Oline displayed interest in her husband's work and was a devout Lutheran. Her background made her a worldly, spirited person. A contemporary noted that Oline yearned for more than a life among sturdy but uneducated farmers.

Reverend Muus, deeply religious and uncompromising in matters of faith, impressed those who met him. Nevertheless, the minister's unbending pietism and stern manner earned him critics. Followers who strayed from the path he laid out could expect severe rebukes. In ministerial matters, however, he often displayed kindness to those in need or distress.

Muus believed in education for the children of his parishioners, but preferred it to be based on his Lutheran standards. He created twenty parochial schools for immigrant children. Muus was a founder of St. Olaf College at nearby Northfield and became its first president.

While Muus dealt with challenges presented by American culture, his marriage to Oline floundered. Life in remote Holden was difficult compared to Oline's comfortable youth. Her husband had little time for her and their children. During winter, Bernt allowed only a single room and the kitchen to be heated.

When Oline broke her leg in 1877 while pregnant with their sixth child, Bernt advised her to let "patience be your liniment." In November 1878, the day her husband dedicated St. Olaf's Old Main building, their ailing twelve-year-old son died of typhus.

As Oline's spiritual leader, Bernt denied her communion for what she considered trivial matters. He also stopped her from going back to Norway to visit her family, saying that wives with such demands should be sent to St. Peter (an asylum for the insane). Prior to Oline's request to travel, Bernt had visited Norway alone.

== Case ==
In early December 1879, Oline brought suit against Bernt. To better support their children, she wanted access to an inheritance left by her father. Bernt had taken the funds, believing they were his to control. In a time when a married woman's legal rights were still precarious, a wife's lawsuit against her clergyman husband stirred public interest.

== Decision ==
The court ruled that the statute of limitations had run out on the first of Oline's two estate payments. Bernt could keep the initial sum but would have to repay her the second portion, around $1,118. On May 5, 1882, in the case Oline Muus vs. Bernt J. Muus, 29 Minn. 115 (12 N. W. Rep. 343), the Minnesota Supreme Court upheld the lower court's original ruling.

== Aftermath ==
Back in Holden, Oline faced the censure of church members. She claimed that her treatment amounted to "torture-a-plenty." A formal March 1881 meeting was held to determine if Oline should be ousted from the church for disobeying her husband. She argued that a wife did not owe blind obedience to her husband. She stated that if God had created women to be slaves, he would not have given them intellect and spiritual ability.

Bernt also faced questioning from the membership. An estimated one thousand people attended a February 1880 meeting held mainly to consider dismissing him. During an 1882 gathering, the congregation voted seventy-three to thirty-seven to retain him.

Oline Muus left the Holden congregation and moved to Minneapolis. Courts granted her a limited divorce on January 20, 1883. She received $150 per year for ten years as alimony. Bernt was given custody of the children, who were still minors. In 1896, Oline moved to Fruithurst, Alabama, where she owned and operated a hotel. She died there on September 4, 1922.

Pastor Muus had a stroke in the early 1890s that left him partially paralyzed. A neighbor described him as a "sad, lonesome man." Muus decided to return to Norway, where he died on May 25, 1900.
