= Jens Rynning =

Norwegian priest (1778–1857)

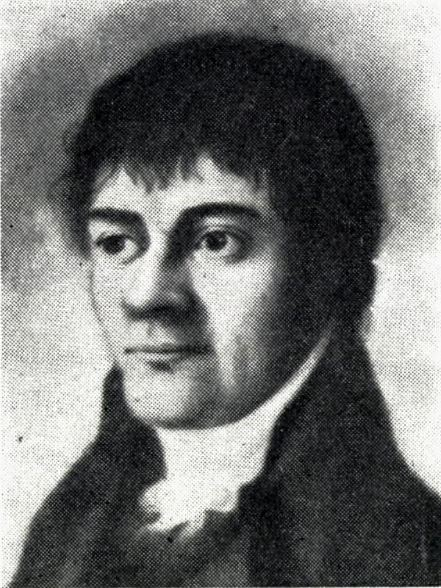
Ordfører Jens Rynning Snåsa

Jens Rynning (May 30, 1778 – June 11, 1857) was a Norwegian priest and public education advocate. He spent longest part of his working life as a priest at Ringsaker Church and Snåsa Church.

== Life ==
Rynning was born in Kastnes in the prestegjeld of Tranøy (now part of Dyrøy Municipality). He was the son of Ole Rynning, who served as the bailiff (fogd) in Senja and Tromsø, and his wife Golla Hveding. Rynning married a daughter of the rural shopkeeper Bernt Anker Steen in Ringsaker. In 1796 he enrolled in the Trondheim Cathedral School, and he received his cand.theol. degree from the University of Copenhagen in 1800. In addition to theology, had also studied other topics that he thought could be useful as a priest and teacher of the people, such as agriculture. His interest in such practical matters made him a typical example of a so-called "potato priest" (Norwegian: potetprest).

In Norway, he worked as a Sunday school teacher in Trondheim for a time and as a tutor at the home of Eiler Hagerup Holtermann at the Austrått Manor. He took a position in Copenhagen as an applicant for public office in 1805, and was then appointed a traveling curate in Ringsaker in the same year. In 1817, he became parish priest in the same place. Rynning did much to improve schooling in Ringsaker. In 1824 he was appointed parish priest in Snåsa, where he remained the rest of his life. Rynning died in Snåsa.

Rynning was the father of the emigrant author Ole Rynning, who wrote the popular booklet Amerika-boka (The America Book). He was the grandfather of Bernt Julius Muus (1832–1900), who helped found St. Olaf College in Northfield, Minnesota.

== Publications and distinctions ==
In 1803, Rynning received a prize of 200 riksdaler for his work Tanker over Tangbrændingens Indflydelſe paa Fiſkerierne og Agerdyrkningen (Considerations on the Influence of Kelp Burning on Fishing and Agriculture). He also received a prize from the Norwegian Society for Development (Selskabet for Norges Vel) for his work Odelsrettens Indflydelſe paa National-Charakteren og Velſtanden i Norge (The Influence of Allodial Rights on the National Charity and Prosperity of Norway, printed in the journal Historisk-philosophiske Samlinger in 1813). Rynning became a member of the Royal Norwegian Society of Sciences and Letters in 1805. For many years he sent reports to the newspaper Morgenbladet from Snåsa.
