= Potato priest =

Norwegian potato-cultivating priests

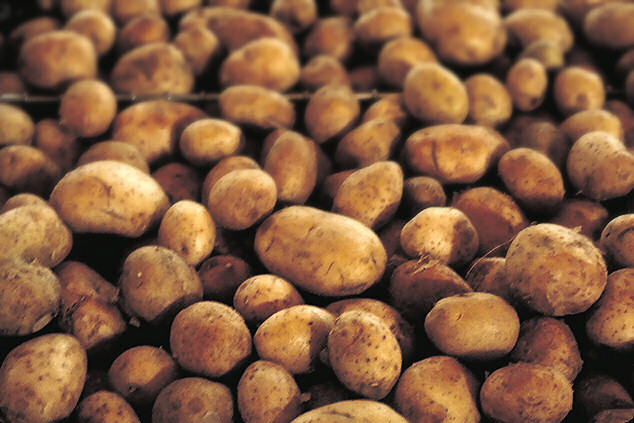

A potato priest (Norwegian: potetprest) is a Norwegian term used for priests in the 18th century who, partly following royal orders, encouraged the cultivation of potatoes in Norway. The term is also used for priests as equally interested in agriculture and practical matters as in preaching.

The potato plant came to Europe together with the South American tobacco plant in the 16th century. In order to use agricultural land at higher latitudes (such as the Nordic region), the Danish-Norwegian king and priests sought to promote potato cultivation, primarily because it had been determined that it provided large and relatively certain yields at such latitudes. Thus, the potato became an important part of the food supply in Norway. There was some resistance to the potato in Norway at the beginning, partly because people were not certain which parts of the plant were edible. Later, after the potato was adopted, it was also discovered that potatoes had beneficial effects against scurvy.

The introduction of the potato was of great importance in Norway. It has been said that the potato was more important to the Norwegian people than the Constitution. It was potato cultivation that was able to create immediate relief in the daily pursuit of life after 1814, not the constitution.

Prominent examples of potato priests include Peder Harboe Hertzberg, Abraham Pihl, Jens Rynning, and Jacob Nicolai Wilse.
