= Jacob Nicolai Wilse =

Norwegian priest (1735-1801)

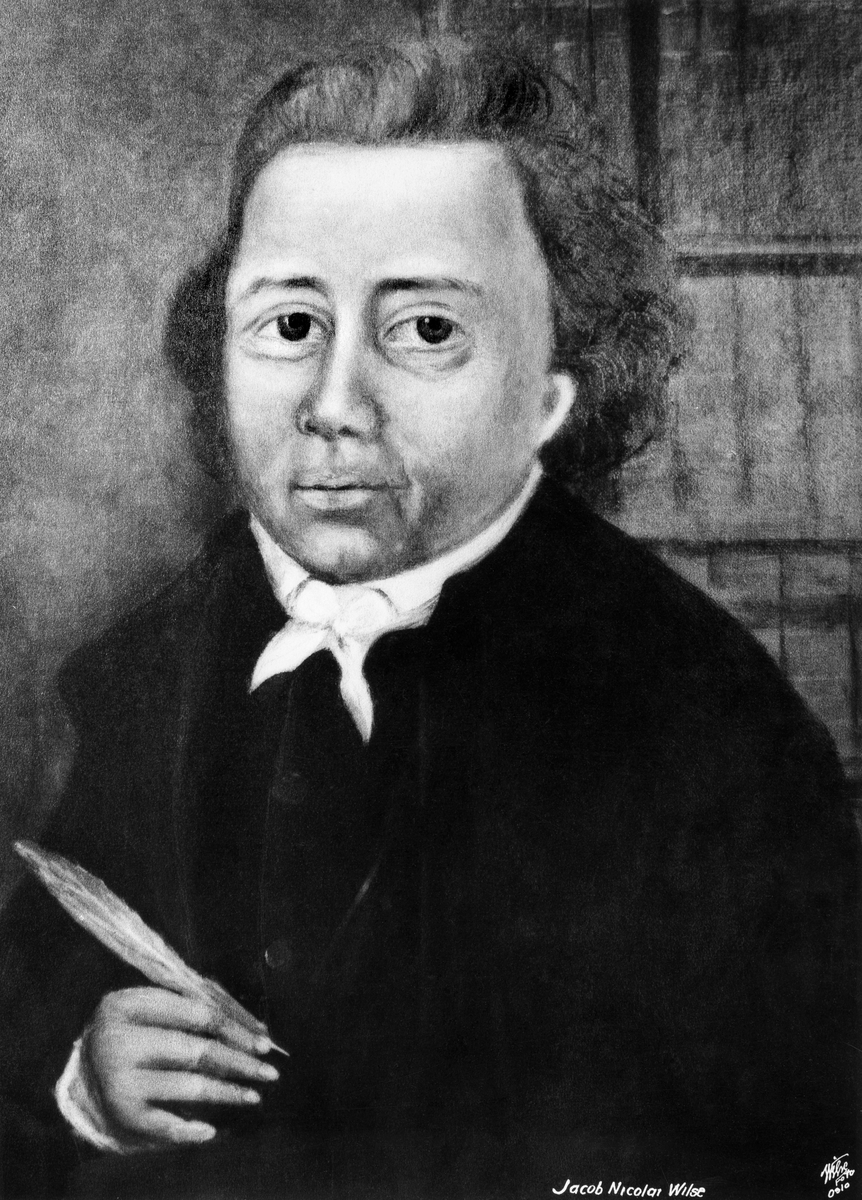
- Born: January 24, 1736; Lemvig, Denmark
- Died: May 23, 1801 (aged 66); Eidsberg, Norway
- Education: University of Copenhagen
- Occupations: Priest, meteorologist
- Years active: 1768–1801
- Religion: Lutheranism
- Church: Church of Norway

Jacob Nicolai Wilse (January 24, 1736 – May 23, 1801) was a parish priest in Spydeberg and Eidsberg, Norway. He was born in Lemvig, Denmark and is known for writing topographic works with extensive descriptions of travel in Norway in the 1790s. Wilse is considered Østfold county's first significant cultural researcher and one of the fathers of Norwegian village history. His friend Hans Strøm also wrote topographical works for Sunnmøre and Eiker. Like Strøm, Wilse authored one of the first descriptions of the relationship between nature and human activity. He was also an Enlightenment-era philosopher, a so-called "potato priest" (Norwegian: potetprest). Wilse was an early supporter of Norway having its own university, and he also envisioned a women's university.

== Life and work ==
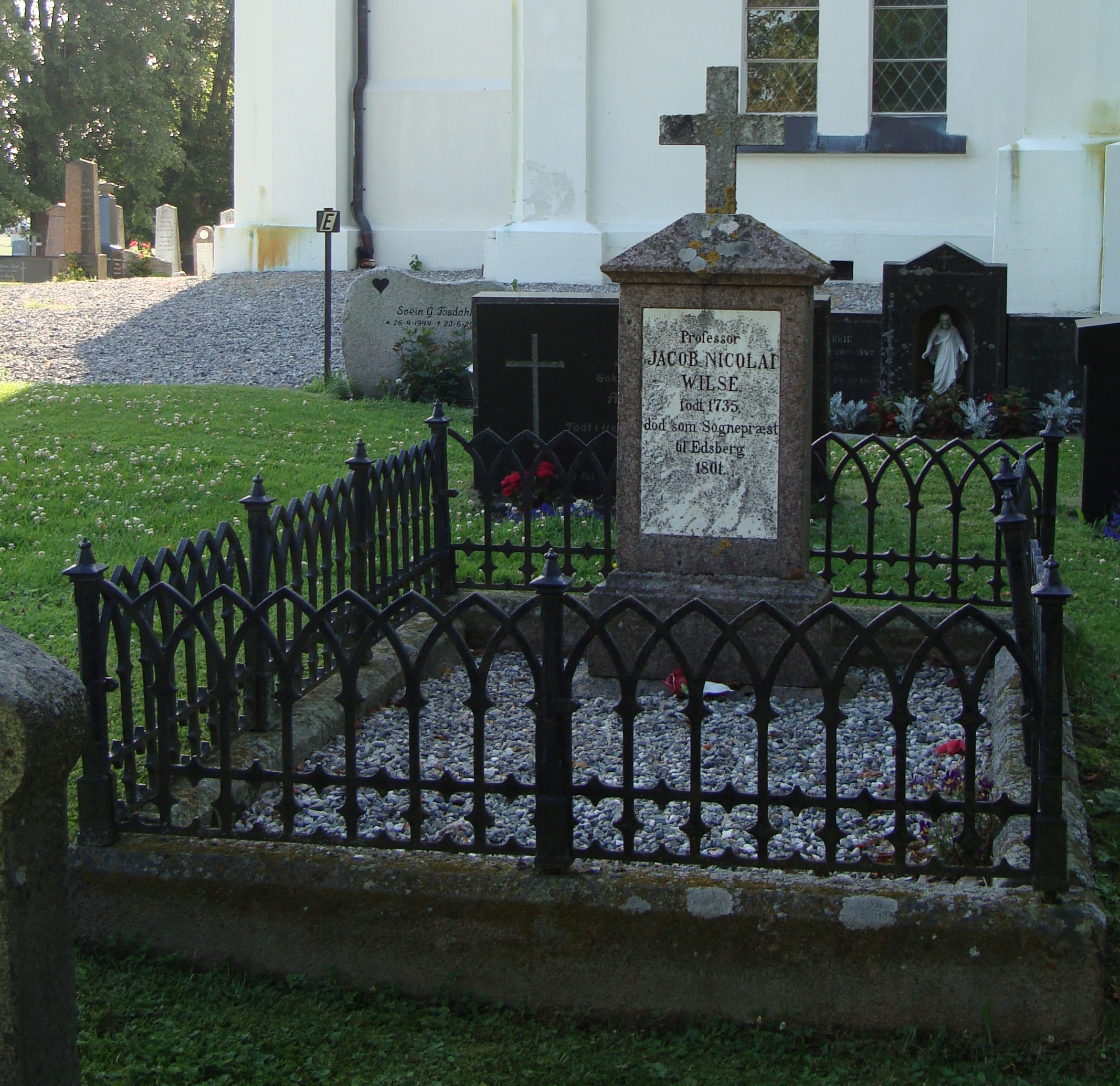
Wilse's grave at Eidsberg Church

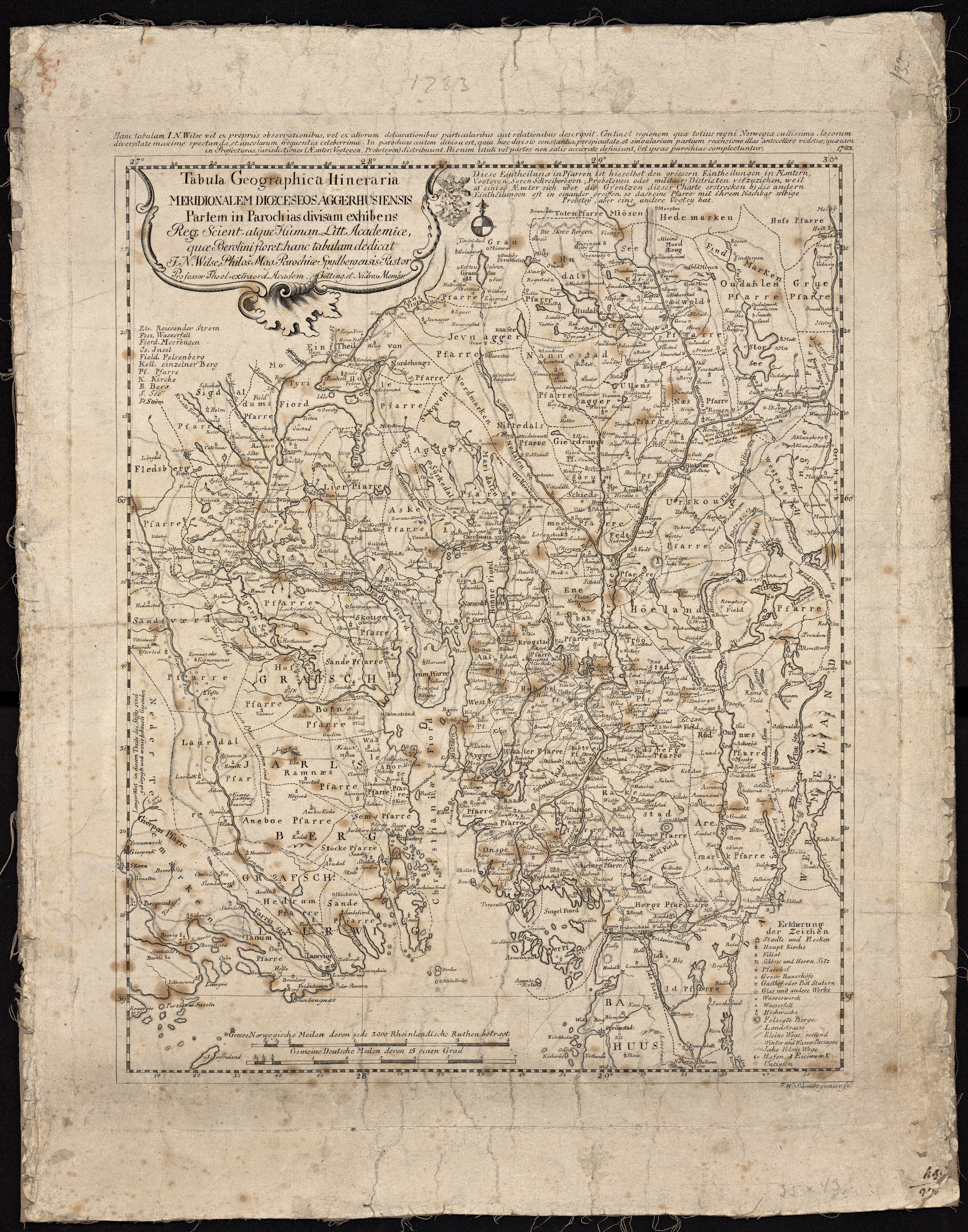
Wilse's map of the Akershus Diocese

Wilse graduated from the theology program at the University of Copenhagen in 1756, and then, freed from "academisk Tvang, men blot [av] Lyst og [ved] Leilighed" (academic drudgery, but only [out of] joy and [with] opportunity), he devoted himself to mathematics and physics. He worked as a private instructor for the Russian ambassador in Copenhagen and the timber merchant Peder Mossencrone in Halden, among other engagements, until he received a master's degree in philosophy in 1768.

Wilse came to Spydeberg as the parish priest in 1768. For 10 years, he collected material that resulted in his 1779 publication Phyſiſk, oeconomiſk og ſtatiſtiſk Beſkrivelſe over Spydeberg Præſtegield og Egn i Aggershuus-Stift udi Norge, og i Anledning deraf adſkillige Afhandlinger og Anmerkninger deels Norge i Almindelighed, deels dens Østre-Kant i Særdeleshed vedkommende, med nødvendige Kobbere og Bilager, efter 10 Aars egne Underſøgninger (A Physical, Economic, and Statistical Description of the Parish of Spydeberg and Area in the Akershus Diocese of Norway, and on the Occasion thereof Diverse Reports and Commentaries, in Part about Norway in General, in Part about Its Eastern Region in Particular, with the Requisite Copperplates and Appendices, after Ten Years of Personal Research). This description contains a number of suggestions for improvements, including a library. Wilse himself had an extensive book collection and loaned out books from it.

The last chapter of Wilse's book contains his vision for the future: Here, the learned Philoneus (Wilse's alter ego) falls asleep during a stroll in Spydeberg's delightful landscape. He wakes up when an old man comes out of Mierskovskollen (Mjærskau Hill) and invites him to drink from a horn. The drink leads him directly into a future in which the cultivated land in Spydeberg has increased, and diligent hermits plant forests in Norway's mountains. Philoneus sees a harmonious society in which reason, diligence, and zeal prevail, with singing shepherds and newly cultivated fields. Something has happened, but nothing is said about what has caused the change. Inside Mjærskau Hill he sees medals, paintings, and monuments describing important measures that were taken: the establishment of a factory in a place with rich deposits of clay, and charity houses where the poor were put to work spinning and producing matches. One of the mottoes there is Hvo ſom har nok i det mindre, behøver ey det meere 'Whoever has maintained himself on less does not need more.'

Wilse's Meteorographia Compendiosa (Concise Meteorography, 1778) was groundbreaking for the development of meteorology as an independent discipline. In a concise manner, he formulated the first detailed system of symbols to record the weather over a certain period in a tabular form. A series of statistical values could thus be recorded and processed in a clear manner. The symbols were put into use in the very first worldwide observation network established by the Mannheim Meteorological Society (Societas Meteorologica Palatina) in Mannheim, Germany. Spydeberg was one of the network's 39 stations. At the expense of the Elector of the Palatinate, Wilse was sent two thermometers, three barometers, and a declinatorium (an instrument measuring the north direction of the magnetic needle in a compass and showing fluctuations in the magnetic field). From 1783 onward, he regularly sent weather observations to the Mannheim society.

Wilse became a member of the Göttingen Academy of Sciences and Humanities in 1781 and a member of the Royal Norwegian Society of Sciences and Letters in Trondheim in 1783. In 1784, as he wrote, he was allernaadigſt gratis aflagt med Character af Profeſſore Theologiæ Extraordinario 'became an extraordinary professor of theology free of charge'. In 1785 he became the parish priest in Eidsberg, and he published his Topografiſk Beſkrivelse af Edsberg Præſtegjeld (Topographical Description of the Parish of Eidsberg) in 1791. He continued his weather observations there. Toward the end of his life, he prepared a major work on Norway's climate. This work remained unfinished.

Wilse's travel records from Norwegian settlements were first published in German by Johann Bernoulli in Berlin as part of the work Johann Bernoulli's Sammlung kurzer Reiſebeſchreibungen und anderer zur Erweiterung der Laͤnder- und Menſchenkenntniß dienender Nachrichten (Johann Bernoulli's Collection of Short Travelogues and Other News to Expand Knowledge of Countries and People). This entire work was translated into Danish and published by S. Poulsens Forlag in Copenhagen from 1790 to 1798 under the title Reiſe-Jagttagelser i nogle af de nordiſke Lande, med Henſigt til Folkenes og Landenes Kundſkab (Travel Observations in Some of the Nordic Countries, with Regard to the Knowledge of Peoples and Countries).

In 1780, Wilse published a glossary called Norſk Ordbog eller Samling af norſke Ord, i ſær de ſom bruges i Egnen af Spydeberg (Norwegian Dictionary or Collection of Norwegian Words, Especially Those Used in the Parish of Spydeberg).

Reminders of Wilse's time are still evident at the rectory farm in Spydeberg, where Wilse's plants are still flourishing. He received many of the plants through an exchange of letters with the Swedish botanist Carl Linnaeus.

Wilse advocated a Norwegian university for many years, and he convened a meeting in Christiania in 1793 on the matter. This became a reality ten years after his death, when the University of Oslo was founded in 1811.

== Family ==
In 1770 Wilse married Anna Cecilia Thorup (1749–1783) and had eight children with her. After she died, he then married Gurine Maria Morland (1760–1796). He was survived by his third wife, Johanne Marie Grøgaard (1758–1814), and eleven children.

== Legacy ==
A street is named after Wilse in Oslo's St. Hanshaugen district, Wilses gate (Wilse Street), and also in Spydeberg, where there is a Wilses gate. In Spydeberg there is also a bust of Wilse next to the town hall.

The Wilse Medal (Wilsemedalje) is awarded annually by the Borgarsyssel Museum, the Østfold Historical Society, and the Østfold Society for the Preservation of Ancient Monuments for achievements in the study of Østfold's culture.

The weather symbols that Wilse devised are still in daily use in almost unchanged form at meteorological institutes around the world.
