= Chris Rynning =

Norwegian business executive (born 1967)

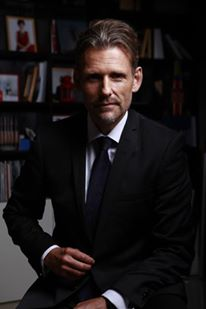
- Born: August 14, 1967 (age 59); Trondheim, Norway
- Education: University of Chicago (MBA); ESSEC
- Occupations: Investor author entrepreneur
- Website: www.chrisrynning.com

Chris Rynning (born August 14, 1967) is an author, entrepreneur, and financial commentator.

== Biography ==
A graduate of ESSEC in Paris, Rynning holds an MBA with a specialization in Finance from the University of Chicago.

He was based in Beijing from 1997 through 2016 and held roles in China, in companies including Ascend Ventures, MINT, and Elkem. From December 2006 until January 2015, Rynning was CEO of Origo Partners PLC, an investment company and he was also a director of Origo Advisors Ltd through March 2019.

He is the founder of the Chinese venture fund nHack.

Rynning was the Chairman of the Norwegian Business Association in Beijing and Adjunct Professor II at Handelshøyskolen Trondheim (HIST), Norway. Rynning was also the Editor of Norwegian Links, a business magazine connecting China and Scandinavia. Rynning has been a commentator with various Chinese and Western media, including Bloomberg, CNBC, FT, DN, PE International and Finansavisen.

Rynning has self-published two books about China, Little Streams, Big River (2013) and China AI: How China Will Dominate AI and Blockchain Technology (2018), and publishes a newsletter on Chinese economics and financial events.
