= St. Olaf Band =

The St. Olaf Band

The St. Olaf Band, an ensemble of approximately 90 musicians, is the touring concert band of St. Olaf College, Northfield, Minnesota, United States. The band was founded in 1891, and holds the honor of being the first music organization established at St. Olaf. F. Melius Christiansen assumed leadership of the band in 1903. In 1906, Christiansen took the St. Olaf Band on tour to Norway to play in celebrations for the coronation of King Haakon VII, of the newly independent Norway. They were thus the first college band to conduct a tour abroad.

Miles H. Johnson took over direction of the ensemble in 1957, and held the position of conductor for 37 years. During this time, Johnson drove the band to even greater heights, earning it national and international acclaim as a performing ensemble.

In 1994, Dr. Timothy Mahr was appointed conductor of the ensemble. In March 1997, the band toured California for nine days, and were one of four college bands invited to perform at the American Bandmasters Association National Convention in San Diego. Under the direction of Dr. Mahr, the St. Olaf Band has produced nine compact disc recordings, four of which have received worldwide praise.

In 2023, following Dr. Mahr's retirement, Dr. Henry L. Dorn was named the newest conductor of the band.

The band, hailed by The New Yorker as "one of America's preeminent bands", traditionally tours domestically for one week at the beginning of February. In the summer of 2005, the St. Olaf Band, St. Olaf Orchestra and St. Olaf Choir traveled on a joint tour to Norway, celebrating the college's Norwegian heritage and the centennial of Norway's independence from Sweden. During January 2010, the band toured Japan for the first time in its history, and returned again in June 2023. The St. Olaf Band was selected to be a performing ensemble at the prestigious College Band Directors National Association National Conference in March 2013 under Dr. Mahr, and again under Dr. Dorn in March 2025. In January 2017, the band toured Australia and New Zealand and performed with ensembles including the Australian Wind Symphony and the Royal Australian Navy Band. The band is scheduled to tour Italy, Croatia, and Slovenia in the summer of 2027.
