= Olaf Christiansen =

Olaf C. Christiansen
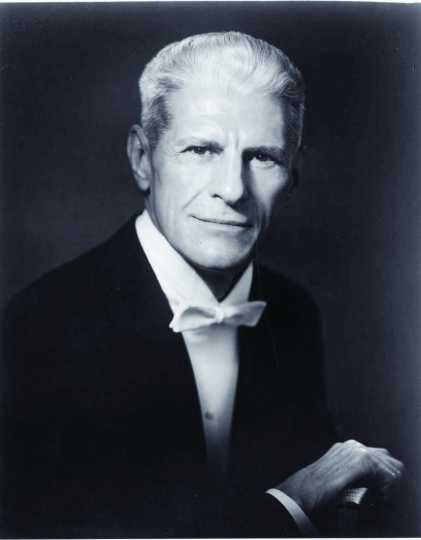

Background information
- Born: Olaf C. Christiansen; August 12, 1901; Minneapolis, Minnesota
- Died: April 12, 1984 (aged 83) Northfield, Minnesota
- Genres: Choral Music
- Occupations: Composer; Conductor
- Formerly of: St. Olaf Choir

Olaf C. Christiansen (August 12, 1901 – April 12, 1984) was an American composer, professor, and conductor in the Lutheran choral tradition. He succeeded his father as the second conductor of the St. Olaf Choir, which he led for 27 years.

== Background ==
The second son of famed choral conductor F. Melius Christiansen, Christiansen grew up in Northfield, Minnesota where he was actively engaged in both athletics and music. He played in high school with the St. Olaf Band. After a brief sabbatical, he began studying music seriously at St. Olaf College in 1921. During college, he sang with, and occasionally conducted, the St. Olaf Choir before graduating in 1925. Upon graduation, Christiansen briefly studied opera in New York City with baritone Paul Parks.

== Career ==
Christiansen began teaching music at the Oberlin Conservatory in Oberlin, OH, where he founded the Oberlin A Cappella Choir in 1929. After obtaining a master of sacred music degree from Union Theological Seminary in 1940, he returned to his alma mater in 1941 to co-conduct the St. Olaf Choir with his father. Upon his father's retirement in 1943, he became the full time conductor of the St. Olaf Choir, a position he held until 1968

During his career, Christiansen spread the Lutheran choral tradition across the nation. In addition to domestic and international tours with the St. Olaf Choir, he co-founded the Christiansen Choral School with his father, which was attended by more than 7,000 American music directors. He was a frequent guest conductor at music festivals and clinics. He also composed and arranged sacred choir works.

Christiansen died in 1984 from bone cancer.
