= St. Olaf Choir =

Choir based in Minnesota, United States

- Choir
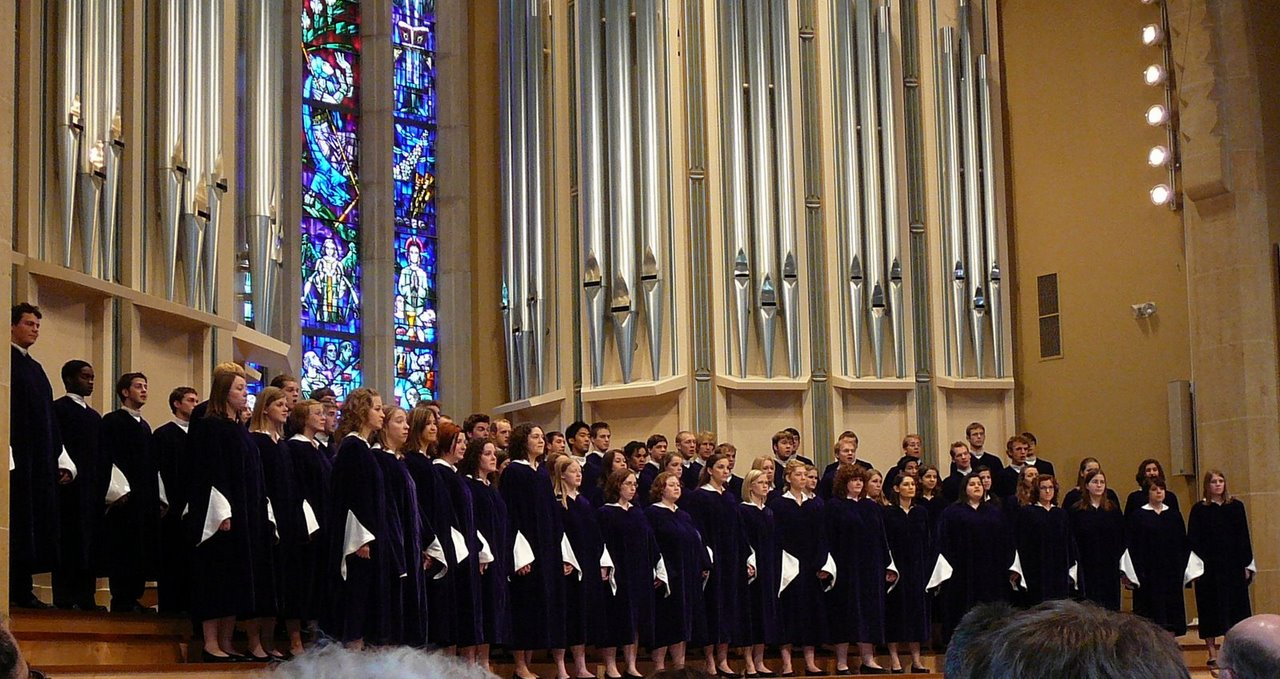
- Origin: Northfield, Minnesota, U.S.
- Founded: 1912 (114 years ago)
- Genre: a cappella, classical, gospel
- Members: 75
- Chief conductor: Anton Armstrong
- Affiliation: Evangelical Lutheran Church in America
- Website: www.stolafchoir.com

The St. Olaf Choir is a premier a cappella choir based in Northfield, Minnesota. Founded in 1912 by Norwegian immigrant F. Melius Christiansen, the choir has been influential to other church and college choirs for its performance of unaccompanied sacred music. Conducted since 1990 by Anton Armstrong, there have been four conductors in the choir's 114 year history.

== Description ==
Previously founding the St. Olaf Band, professor F. Melius Christiansen formed the St. Olaf Choir in 1912 from the worship choir of nearby St. John's Lutheran Church. After a successful tour of the American Midwest that same year, the choir began planning a tour of the college's cultural homeland, Norway. Beatrice Gjertsen Bessesen was one of the performers. This 1913 tour included performances in front of King Haakon VII and Queen Maud. In the 1920s, the St. Olaf Choir began touring regularly after a highly acclaimed tour of the East Coast. Subsequent tours, recordings, and radio broadcasts spread the group's fame among the choral community, transforming the Midwest into a hotbed of choral activity.

In 1943, Olaf Christiansen succeeded his father as conductor of the St. Olaf Choir. Graduating from St. Olaf College in 1925 and singing in the choir under his father, Olaf had earned advanced degrees at Union Theological Seminary and taught at the Oberlin Conservatory. After 27 years as conductor, Olaf retired in 1968. .

The third conductor of the St. Olaf Choir was Kenneth Jennings, a 1950 graduate of St. Olaf College who sang in the choir under his predecessor. Under Jennings' direction, the choir expanded its repertoire and began occasionally performing accompanied music and larger works. Jennings also expanded the choir's global reach with a 1986 tour of Asia. In 1988, it became one of five choirs in the world to sing at the Olympic Choral Arts Festival in Seoul, South Korea.

In 1990, Anton Armstrong became the fourth conductor of the St. Olaf Choir. Graduating in 1978, Armstrong also sang in the choir under his predecessor. He was considered well suited for the position, having written his doctoral thesis on the legacy of the ensemble. Armstrong further broadened the choir's performance repertoire by emphasizing music from Africa and Latin America, American spirituals, and occasional secular pieces and folk songs.

The St. Olaf Choir is perhaps best known for its annual performances in the St. Olaf Christmas Festival, which airs annually on national and international radio and television. Furthermore, the choir is known for closing nearly every performance with its signature piece, Beautiful Savior. In 1998, the St. Olaf Choir was chronicled in a book by historian Joseph Shaw.

== Notable Performances ==
Since the 1920s, the St. Olaf Choir has performed on annual tours domestically throughout all regions of the United States. The choir has attracted capacity audiences at venues such as Carnegie Hall, the Kennedy Center, Severance Hall, the Kauffman Center, Meyerson Symphony Center, and the Orchestra Halls of Chicago and Minneapolis. Furthermore, the choir travels internationally every four years, with previous performances in Scandinavia, Great Britain, France, Japan, South Korea, New Zealand, Australia, and South Africa.

In 2005 the St. Olaf Choir performed at the White House for President George W. Bush to commemorate The National Day of Prayer. That same year, the choir performed in the final concerts of the National Conference of the American Choral Directors Association at Walt Disney Concert Hall in Los Angeles, only to sing the next day in an acclaimed performance at New York's Carnegie Hall. Internationally, the choir has performed at the Seoul Olympic Arts Festival, the Strasbourg and Bergen Music Festivals, and the closing concert of the Sixth World Symposium on Choral Music in Minneapolis.

In 2007, the choir appeared in a live simulcast of the St. Olaf Christmas Festival, which showed on more than 180 movie theatres across the nation and reach 2.5 million viewers on a later PBS broadcast. In December 2011, the 100th St. Olaf Christmas Festival was simulcast to nearly 300 movie theatres. In 2013, the choir appeared in a television special titled "Christmas in Norway with the St. Olaf Choir", filmed at the Nidaros Cathedral in Trondheim, Norway. The special won 2 regional Emmy Awards in 2014.

Also in 2007, the St. Olaf Choir's recording of "Lacrimosa" from Mozart's Requiem appeared in a television commercial for Nike to promote their new Air Jordan XXII shoes.

== Notable alumni ==
The St. Olaf Choir has produced many respected composers and music educators throughout the 20th and 21st centuries. Particular former members of note include:

- Anton Armstrong, Conductor of the St. Olaf Choir
- Kenneth Jennings, Conductor and Composer
- Christopher Aspaas, Director of Choral Activities at Texas Christian University
- Mark Stover, Director of Choral Activities at Calvin University
- Jocelyn Hagen, Composer
- Timothy C. Takach, Composer
- René Clausen, Composer and Choir Director
- Bradley Ellingboe, Composer and Conductor
- Paul J. Christiansen, Composer and Conductor
- Olaf Christiansen, Composer and Conductor
- Craig Hella Johnson, Composer and Director of Conspirare
- Michael Hanawalt, Director of Graduate Choral Studies at Florida State University
- Craig Arnold, Conductor
- Abbie Betinis, Composer
- Mari Valverde, Composer
- Joseph Kemper, Conductor and Assistant Professor of Music at St. Olaf College
- Margaret Burk, Composer and Director of Choral Activities at Carthage College
- Katie Burk, Organist and Canon for Cathedral Music at Trinity Episcopal Cathedral
- Matthew J. Olson, Director of Choral Activities at Carleton College
- Leigh Ann Garner, President of the Organization of American Kodály Educators

== Discography ==
The St. Olaf Choir has recorded 27 full-length albums, and has been included on numerous other recordings (such as yearly recordings of the St. Olaf Christmas Festival). Furthermore, the St. Olaf Choir can be heard in the 1972 western, The Great Northfield Minnesota Raid.

- A Choral Tapestry (1994)
- Advance Australia Fair (1998)
- At The Ordway Music Theatre (1985)
- Beautiful Savior (1985)
- Charles Ives: The Celestial Country (2002)
- Choral Masterworks Series Vol. I, II, III, and IV (1998, 2002, 2011, 2012)
- Christmas in Norway (2013)
- Great Hymns of Faith Vol. I, II, and III (1999, 2004, 2012)
- Hallelujah! We Sing Your Praises (1992)
- Harmony: American Songs of Faith (with the American Boychoir) (2007)
- Holy Oles: Highlights From A Prairie Home Companion (with the St. Olaf Orchestra and Garrison Keillor) (2001)
- Mozart Requiem/Sussmayer Requiem (with the St. Paul Chamber Orchestra) (2005)
- My Soul's Been Anchored in the Lord (2001)
- Norge Mitt Norge (2013)
- O Yule Full of Gladness (1993)
- Portrait of the Orient (1989)
- Reflections of Norway (1987)
- Repertoire for Mixed Voices, Vol. I and II (2007, 2009)
- Sing For Joy (1991)
- Spirituals of William Dawson (1997)
- Worthy to Be Praised (1997)
