= F. Melius Christiansen =

American conductor (1871–1955)

Fredrik Melius Christiansen
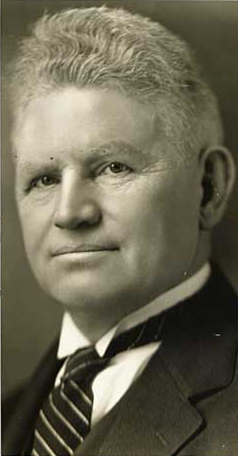
- Fredrik Melius Christiansen ca. 1926
- Born: April 1, 1871; Eidsvold, Norway
- Died: June 1, 1955 (aged 84); Northfield, MN
- Education: Augsburg College; Northwestern Conservatory of Music; Royal Conservatory of Music (Leipzig)
- Occupation: Choral conductor
- Organization: St. Olaf College
- Successor: Olaf Christiansen
- Spouse: Edith Lindem
- Children: Elmer Christiansen; Carl Christiansen; Tullah Christiansen; Jake Christiansen; Olaf Christiansen; Paul J. Christiansen; Elsa Christiansen Wycisk
- Parents: Anders Christiansen (father); Oleana Jonsen (mother)

Fredrik Melius Christiansen (April 1, 1871 – June 1, 1955) was a Norwegian-born violinist and choral conductor in the Lutheran choral tradition. He is most notable for his many a cappella choral arrangements, and for founding The St. Olaf Choir in 1912.

== Early life ==
Fredrik Melius Christiansen, the son of a Norwegian factory worker, was born in Eidsvold, municipality in Akershus county, Norway. He took up music at an early age: By three years old he could play his first clarinet, and at six he was marching in his father's band. In addition to clarinet, he went on to learn the violin, piano, and pipe organ. In his teens, he became so proficient at the pipe organ as to be able to take his teacher's place as the organist in Sunday services, although his true passion was the violin. To pay for his lessons, he himself taught piano and violin to beginners, but soon realized that he would meet with limited success in his home country. Thus, at 17, F. Melius emigrated to the United States.

He briefly stayed with his uncle in Oakland, California but was unable to find work as an organist. He then moved to Washburn, Wisconsin where his brother Karl resided, staying for two years before he moved on to Marinette, Wisconsin. In Marinette, he directed both the city band and the church choir, in addition to teaching private lessons. It was there that he witnessed a performance by a male quartet from Augsburg College in Minneapolis, which left a favorable impression and led to his enrollment in 1892.

After completing the freshman courses at Augsburg, he attended the Northwestern Conservatory of Music, graduating with honors in his studies of music theory and counterpoint. He returned to Marinette to marry Edith Lindem, and in 1897, moved to Leipzig, Germany to study for two years at the Royal Conservatory of Music. While there, he became a regular attendee of the St. Thomas Choir, directed by Gustav Schreck, who was F. Melius' teacher in counterpoint, conducting, and composition. Following the completion of his diploma, F. Melius moved back to Minneapolis with his wife and first child, Elmer, where he enjoyed success as a violin faculty member of Northwestern Conservatory of Music, an organist in a local Lutheran church, and the director of the Kjerulf Male Chorus.

== Career ==
In 1901, Christiansen was recruited by St. Olaf College president John N. Kildahl. The St. Olaf Choir was founded as an outgrowth of the St. John's Lutheran Church Choir in Northfield. For the next 30 years, Christiansen led the St. Olaf Choir, striving for perfect intonation, blend, diction and phrasing. He was a skilled conductor, directing bands and choirs alike. He assumed direction of the St. Olaf Band in 1903, and took the ensemble on tour to Norway in 1906 to play for King Haakon VII, making it the first college music ensemble to conduct a tour abroad. Though his first love was the violin, he received international fame as founding director of the St. Olaf Choir of St. Olaf College in Northfield, Minnesota, USA from 1912 to 1944. Christiansen was considered a pioneer in the art of a cappella (unaccompanied) choral music. Christiansen composed and arranged over 250 musical selections and his choral techniques were spread throughout the U.S. by St. Olaf graduates. The Christiansen choral tradition is widely considered one of the two most influential schools of thought in American choral music, the other being that of John Finley Williamson, who was also influenced by Christiansen in his early years founding Westminster Choir College. Christiansen died in Northfield in 1955.

== Honors ==
- Christiansen was made a Commander of the Order of St. Olaf by the King of Norway in 1928.
- St. Olaf College established the F. Melius Christiansen Lifetime Achievement Award in 1973.
- American Choral Directors Association of Minnesota created the F. Melius Christiansen Endowment Fund in 1996 .

== Family ==
Four of Christiansen's children survived to adulthood, two of them adding their own legacy to the Christiansen tradition of choral music in America.

- Jake Christiansen; coach and athletic director at Concordia College, Moorhead. Jake Christiansen Stadium, "the Jake," was built in his honor.
- Olaf Christiansen; succeeded his father as head of the music department at St. Olaf College and conductor of the St. Olaf Choir. His accomplishments include maintaining the tradition and high standards of his father while introducing many choral arrangements, and more than twenty years of conducting the St. Olaf Choir.
- Paul J. Christiansen; conducted The Concordia Choir from 1937 to 1986, developing the choir into what is now one of the world's finest and most accomplished undergraduate a cappella choirs. Paul, like his father, composed and arranged hundreds of hymns and countless choral compositions. Paul helped to spread his father's music and tradition (as well as developing his own reputation of excellence) to generations.
- Elsa Christiansen Wycisk; married Kurt Wycisk, manager of the Concordia Choir.
