= St. Olaf College =

Private college in Northfield, Minnesota, US

Saint Olaf College
- Former name: Saint Olaf’s School (1874–1889)
- Motto: Fram! Fram! Kristmenn, Krossmenn (Nynorsk)
- Motto in English: Forward! Forward! Men of Christ, Men of the Cross
- Type: Private liberal arts college
- Established: November 6, 1874; 152 years ago
- Religious affiliation: Evangelical Lutheran Church in America
- Academic affiliations: NAICU; Oberlin Group; Annapolis Group; CLAC; ACM; Davis United World College Scholars Program
- Endowment: $881.6 million (2025)
- President: Susan Rundell Singer
- Undergraduates: 3,124 (fall 2024)
- Location: Northfield, Minnesota, U.S. 44°27′34″N 93°10′50″W
- Campus: Rural 920 acres (370 ha)
- Colors: Black and gold
- Nickname: "Oles" /ˈoʊliːz/ OH-leez
- Sporting affiliations: NCAA Division III – MIAC
- Mascots: St. Olaf Lion, "Ole"
- Website: stolaf.edu

St. Olaf College is a private liberal arts college in Northfield, Minnesota, United States. It was founded in 1874 by a group of Norwegian-American pastors and farmers led by Pastor Bernt Julius Muus. The college is named after the King and the Patron Saint Olaf II of Norway and is affiliated with the Evangelical Lutheran Church in America.

As of 2025, the college had 3,124 undergraduate students and 326 full and part-time faculty members. The campus, including its adjacent 430-acre (170 ha) natural lands, is west of downtown Northfield, Minnesota. Northfield is also the home of its neighbor and friendly rival, Carleton College. Between 1995 and 2020, 154 St. Olaf graduates were named Fulbright Scholars and 35 received Goldwater Scholarships.

== History ==
=== Seal and motto ===
The seal of the St. Olaf College displays the coat of arms of Norway, which includes the axe of St. Olaf.

The motto Fram! Fram! Kristmenn, Krossmenn, written in New Norwegian, is adapted from the Old Norse battle cry of King Olaf. It means "Forward! Forward! Men of Christ, Men of the Cross".

=== Founding ===
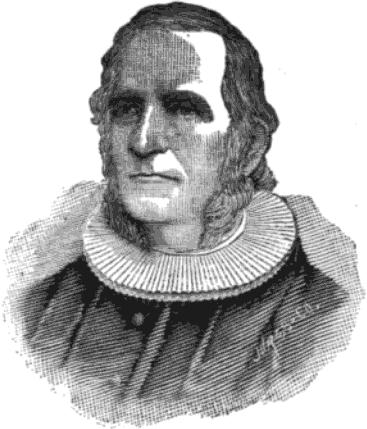
Herman Amberg Preus, (1825–1894), a key figure in organizing the Norwegian Synod

Many Norwegian immigrants arrived in Rice County, Minnesota, and the surrounding area in the late 19th century. Nearly all were Lutheran Christians, and desired a non-secular post-secondary institution in the Lutheran tradition that offered classes in all subjects in both Norwegian and English. The catalyst for St. Olaf's founding was the Reverend Bernt Julius Muus; he sought out the help of N. A. Quammen and H. Thorson. Together they petitioned their parishes and others to raise money to buy a plot of land on which to build the new institution. The three received around $10,000 in pledges, formed a corporation and bought land and four buildings (old Northfield schoolhouses) for the school. Muus came under scrutiny after a divorce case revealed extensive acts of domestic abuse. He fell out of favor with many of his predecessors, but the school did not officially denounce his abuses.

St. Olaf's School opened on January 8, 1875, at its first site under the leadership of its first president, Thorbjorn N. Mohn, a graduate of Luther College. Herman Amberg Preus, president of the Norwegian Synod, laid the foundation stone of the St. Olaf School on July 4, 1877. In 1887 the Manitou Messenger was founded as a campus magazine and has since evolved into the college's student newspaper, now called the Olaf Messenger. Also in 1887, the first female St. Olaf graduate, Agnes Mellby, joined the college. Mellby graduated in 1893. She was the first woman to graduate from a Norwegian Lutheran college in the United States. On June 20, 1889, the school's board of trustees renamed the school St. Olaf College.

In 1932, Red Wing Lutheran Seminary was merged into St. Olaf and its Red Wing campus was closed. The Seminary was an independent academic institution from 1879 to 1932.

=== Financial crisis ===
In 1893, St. Olaf faced severe economic difficulties. A national economic depression caused enrollment to drop from a high of 147 in 1892 to 129 in 1893. Also in 1893 the Norwegian Synod voted to cut ties with the college, greatly reducing its income. By the August 1893 board meeting, the college was $10,000 in debt. On August 2 the Board of Trustees appointed professor H. T. Ytterboe to travel around the Midwest and collect funds for the college. During this time President Mohn took over Ytterboe's responsibilities managing the college's finances. Over the next six years faculty and staff saw their salaries reduced, and the number of teaching faculty was reduced from eleven to seven. Ytterboe spent six years traveling the Midwest and was highly effective at fundraising, averaging $6,500 per year, mostly in small donations of a dollar or more from farmers and private individuals. By 1897, the debt was reduced to less than $4,000, and in 1899 the synod reinstated the college. Historians of the college widely regard Ytterboe's and Mohn's efforts as having saved the college from extinction.

=== Scarlet fever epidemic ===
Following students' return from Christmas vacation in 1903, an epidemic of scarlet fever broke out on the campus and quickly spread. Twenty-eight out of St. Olaf's approximately three hundred students came down with the highly infectious disease. With no local hospital, the north wing on the third floor of the Men's Dormitory was used as a makeshift hospital and staffed with two nurses who worked tirelessly to contain the spread of the disease.

=== 1918 Spanish flu pandemic ===
At the beginning of the spread of the Spanish flu to the United States, St. Olaf went into voluntary quarantine in hopes of avoiding the epidemic, allowing students to leave campus only for emergencies once they had obtained a pass. The first cases on St. Olaf's campus occurred on November 11, 1918, and shortly thereafter the college hospital was filled to capacity. Ytterboe Hall was converted into a hospital for the sick once the temporary beds in Hoyme Chapel had filled. St. Olaf officially closed for the year on December 7, due to a rapid rise of influenza cases. Four students died from flu complications.

=== St. Olaf during the Second World War ===
At the beginning of World War II, St. Olaf was not directly involved with the conflict, with the extent of wartime activities including Red Cross drives and a “Bundles for Britain” project. But by the fall of 1942, over 400 undergraduates and alumni were serving overseas. The campus was also ordered to house 600 U.S. Naval recruits for flight training, leading to the conversion of Mohn and Ytterboe Halls from women's dormitories to housing for naval servicemen. Students living in Ytterboe and Mohn Halls were required to move to Agnes Mellby Hall to accommodate the naval personnel. During World War II, Japanese American students in concentration camps were invited to study at St. Olaf.

=== Connections with Norway ===
Rolvaag Memorial Library

King Olav visited the college in 1987 and King Harald V and Queen Sonja of Norway visited in 2011. Queen Sonja visited the college's campus again in 2022 as part of a tour to celebrate the connections between Norway and Minnesota's Norwegian-American community. She participated in a ribbon-cutting ceremony for the Special Collections vault at Rølvaag Memorial Library. Haakon VIII, then the Crown Prince, visited campus in 2025 to commemorate 200 years of Norwegian immigration to the United States.

=== Presidents ===
St. Olaf has had 12 presidents since its founding:

- Thorbjorn N. Mohn, 1874–99
- John N. Kildahl, 1899–1914
- Lauritz A. Vigness, 1914–18
- Lars W. Boe, 1918–42
- Clemens M. Granskou, 1943–63
- Sidney A. Rand, 1963–80
- Harlan F. Foss, Ph.D., 1980–85
- Melvin D. George, Ph.D., 1985–94
- Mark U. Edwards Jr., Ph.D., 1994–2000
- Christopher M. Thomforde, D.Min., 2001–06
- David R. Anderson, Ph.D., 2006–23
- Susan Rundell Singer, Ph.D., since 2023

=== Church affiliations ===
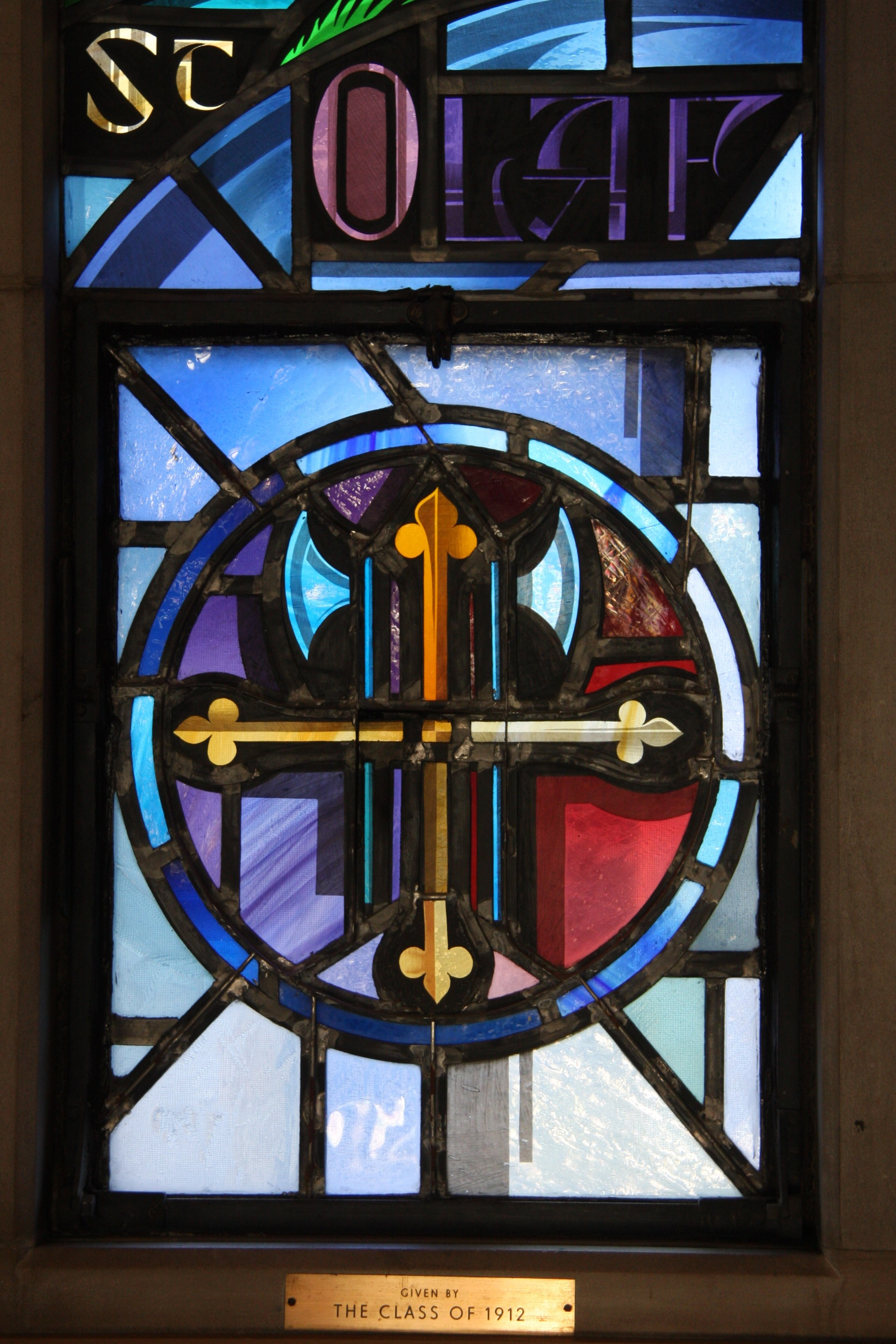
1912 stained glass window honoring St. Olaf in the college chapel

- 1874–87 Norwegian Synod
- 1887–90 Anti-Missourian Brotherhood
- 1890–1917 United Norwegian Lutheran Church of America
- 1917–60 Evangelical Lutheran Church
- 1960–87 The American Lutheran Church
- 1988–present Evangelical Lutheran Church in America

== Campus ==
- Old Main, St. Olaf College
- U.S. National Register of Historic Places
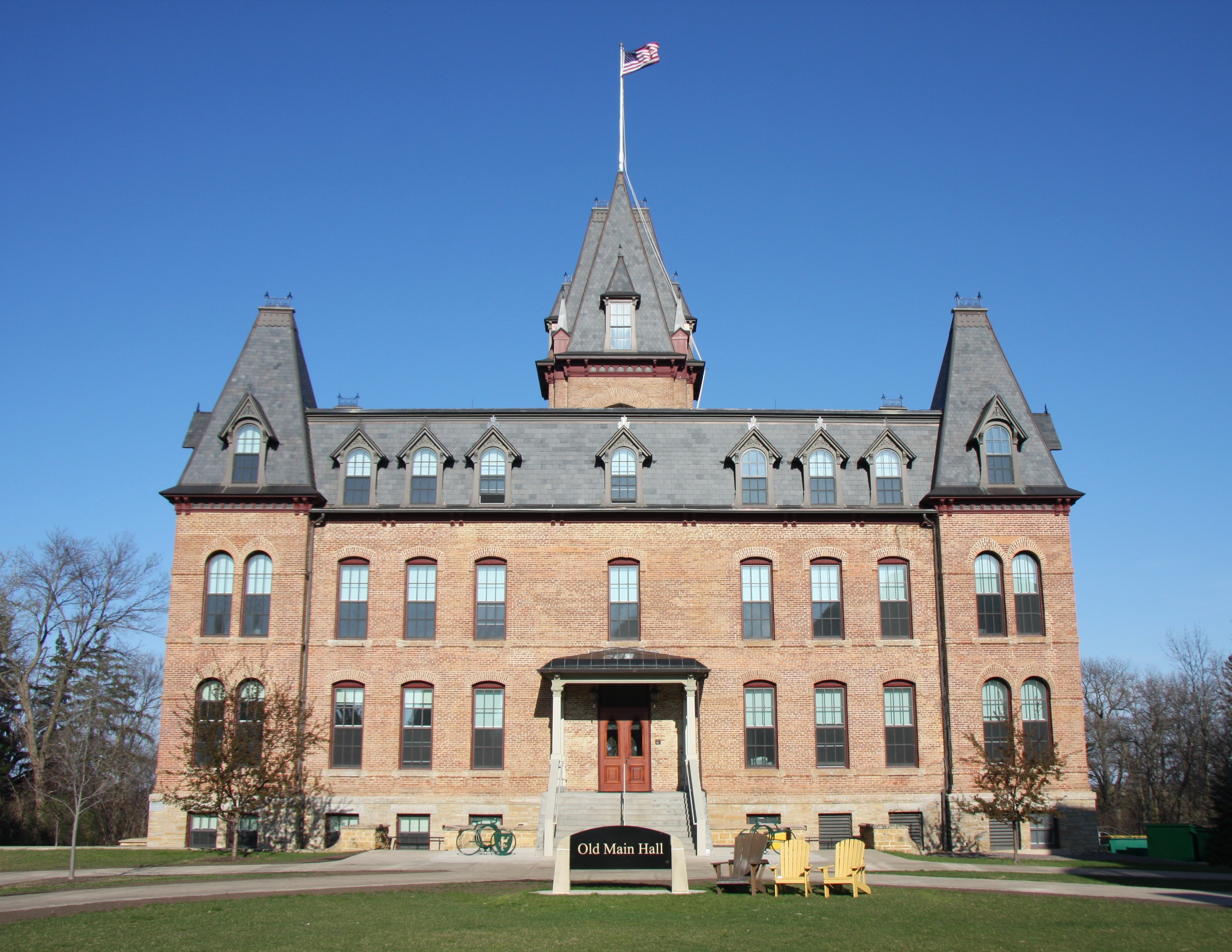
- Old Main
- Location: St. Olaf College campus, Northfield, Minnesota
- Area: Less than 1-acre (0.40 ha)
- Built: 1877
- Architects: Long & Haglin
- Architectural style: Gothic
- NRHP reference No.: 76001073
- Added to NRHP: June 3, 1976

Known as "The Hill", St. Olaf College's 300-acre (120 ha) campus is home to 17 academic and administrative buildings, 29 student residences and 10 athletic facilities. St. Olaf is a residential college; 96% of St. Olaf students reside in one of the 11 residence halls and 18 academic and special interest group houses. Adjacent to campus are 325 acres (132 ha) of restored wetlands, woodlands, and native tall grass prairie owned and maintained by St. Olaf, and a utility-grade wind turbine that supplies up to one-third of the college's electrical needs.

Two buildings on the campus are listed on the National Register of Historic Places: Old Main, designed by Long and Haglin; and Steensland Library, designed by Omeyer and Thori. In 2011, Travel+Leisure named St. Olaf one of the most beautiful college campuses in the United States.

Edward Sövik, a liturgical architect and St. Olaf professor of art until his death in 2014, designed or assisted in the design of 20 campus buildings.

=== Notable buildings ===
==== Center for Art and Dance ====
The Center for Art and Dance is a collaborative project with offerings from the art, art history, and dance departments. It houses the Flaten Art Museum and studio spaces dedicated to painting, drawing, printmaking, ceramics, wood sculpture, digital media, photography, and a metal foundry, all named after alumni and educators who contributed to the development of each discipline. The Flaten Art Museum was founded as the Steensland Art Gallery in 1976. In 2002, it was moved to the Center for Art and Dance and renamed to honor Arnold Flaten, a past professor of art, and his family. The museum has a collection of regional, national, and international works and exhibits these as well as faculty and student work.

The building underwent significant remodeling in the early 2000s and was initially dedicated as the Dittmann Complex, honoring Reidar Dittmann. Dittmann was born in Norway in 1922, and spent the better part of his youth working with the Norwegian resistance against the rising Nazi regime until his imprisonment in the Buchenwald concentration camp. After his immigration to the United States, Dittmann joined St. Olaf's faculty as a professor of art and Norwegian in 1947. In 1952 He and Ansgar Sovik co-founded the International Studies program, now known as the Office of International and Off-Campus Studies. After his death in 2010, serious sexual assault allegations from St. Olaf alumni surfaced under the revisions of Title IX Policy concerning Dittmann and other faculty members. The decision to rename the building was made in 2017, following the pattern of campuses around the country questioning the names of buildings dedicated to notable alumni with contentious histories.

==== Agnes Mellby Hall ====
Mellby Hall was constructed in 1938 to meet the needs of the growing female student population overflowing from Ladies' Hall, the first female dormitory competed in 1879, and Mohn Hall, completed in 1912. The building is dedicated to 1893 alumna Agnes Theodora Mellby, the first woman to graduate from St. Olaf. Born in Christiania, Norway in 1870, Mellby immigrated with her family to the U.S. in 1871 and settled in New Richland, Minnesota. After finishing her Academy (1891) and College (1893) studies at St. Olaf, she returned as the Dean of Women and an educator that fall, affectionately known as the Preceptress by those she worked with. Mellby taught English, German, geography, U. S. History, civics, and math, firm in her resolve to see to the well-being of St. Olaf's female population regarding education and housing. She held her position from 1893 until 1909, and continued to work with the college after retiring until her death in 1918.

==== Agnes Kittelsby Hall ====
In 1956, Agnes Kittelsby Hall was constructed with rooms for 164 women as an adjacent wing to the Gertrude Hilleboe Hall. It was an all-women's dormitory until St. Olaf residence halls became co-ed. The building is named after Agnes Kittelsby, St. Olaf class of 1900. Like many St. Olaf alumnae, Kittelsby taught various subjects at the college after her graduation. In 1914, she moved to China and established American School Kikungshan, a school for the children of American missionaries.

==== Thorson Hall ====
Thorson Hall was constructed as a men's dormitory in 1948. It was one of four dormitories constructed in the 1940s and 1950s to address an increase in enrollment after World War II. The building is named after Harald Thorson (1841–1920), an early benefactor of the college. A businessman, Thorson owned farms, sold horses and mules, and established banks. He was instrumental in establishing St. Olaf's School (as it was first named), choosing the initial 30-acre (12 ha) plot of land and authorizing the first payment for it. He later served as a member of the original Board of Trustees. Thorson's will bequeathed most of his estate to St. Olaf under the stipulation that the money be used for the construction of a new building, Thorson Hall.

== Academics ==
=== Curriculum ===
Before graduating, St. Olaf students complete 15–18 required courses in general education credits, including courses in writing, a foreign language, society, religion, ethics, mathematical reasoning, race, social science, and natural science. Many of the courses are interdisciplinary. St. Olaf offers 47 different majors for the bachelor of arts degree, five for the bachelor of music degree, and 20 areas of concentration, which are pursued independently of majors. Its most popular majors by department are:

1. Mathematics, Statistics, and Computer Science
2. Biology
3. Economics
4. Psychology
5. Chemistry
6. Political Science
7. Music
8. Environmental Studies
9. Kinesiology
10. Art and Art History

The student-to-faculty ratio as of the 2024–25 academic year was 11.8 to 1.

The Paracollege lasted for 31 years, from 1969 to 2000, and was an individualized, interdisciplinary option for obtaining the Bachelor of Arts degree. The Paracollege program emphasized student-centered education through workshops, colloquia, tutorials, seminars, and senior concentrations. It was replaced by the Center for Integrative Studies, which allows students to design individual majors.

=== Admissions ===
According to the St. Olaf College Common Dataset for the class of 2024, St. Olaf received 5,229 applications, accepted 2,656 (50.8%), and enrolled 727. The middle 50% range of SAT Composite scores for the class of 2024 was 1160–1370, while the ACT Composite range was 25–32. Of the 37% of enrolled first-year students who submitted high school class rank, 39% were in the top tenth of their high school classes and 69% ranked in the top quarter. The average high school GPA was 3.68.

=== Rankings ===
Academic rankings

Liberal arts
- U.S. News & World Report: 50
- Washington Monthly: 30

National
- Forbes: 185
- WSJ/College Pulse: 176

The 2025 annual ranking by U.S. News & World Report rates St. Olaf tied for 50th among 211 "National Liberal Arts Colleges", 11th "Best Value Schools", and tied at 23rd for "Best Undergraduate Teaching".

Forbes in 2019 rated St. Olaf 116th overall in its America's Top Colleges ranking of 650 military academies, national universities, and liberal arts colleges, and 50th among liberal arts colleges.

Washington Monthly ranked St. Olaf 28th in 2022 among 203 liberal arts colleges in the U.S. based on its contribution to the public good, as measured by social mobility, research, and promoting public service.

St. Olaf was ranked 47th for liberal arts colleges on Payscale.com's 2016-17 list of highest-paid graduates.

- Steensland Library--St. Olaf College
- U.S. National Register of Historic Places
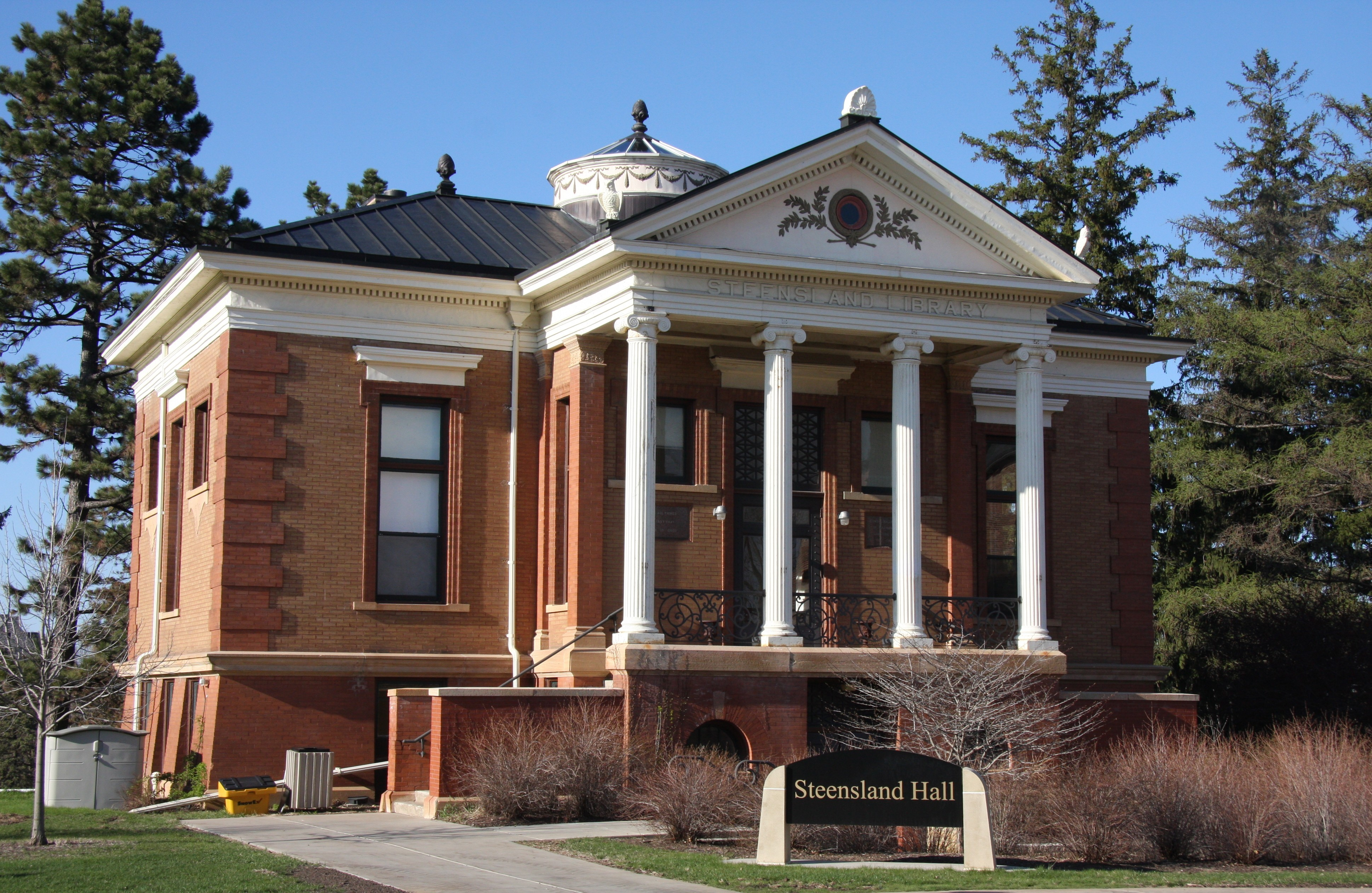
- Steensland Hall in 2015
- Location: Off St. Olaf Ave., Northfield, Minnesota
- Area: less than 1-acre (0.40 ha)
- Built: 1902
- Architect: Omeyer & Thori
- Architectural style: Classical Revival
- MPS: Rice County MRA
- NRHP reference No.: 82003020
- Added to NRHP: April 6, 1982

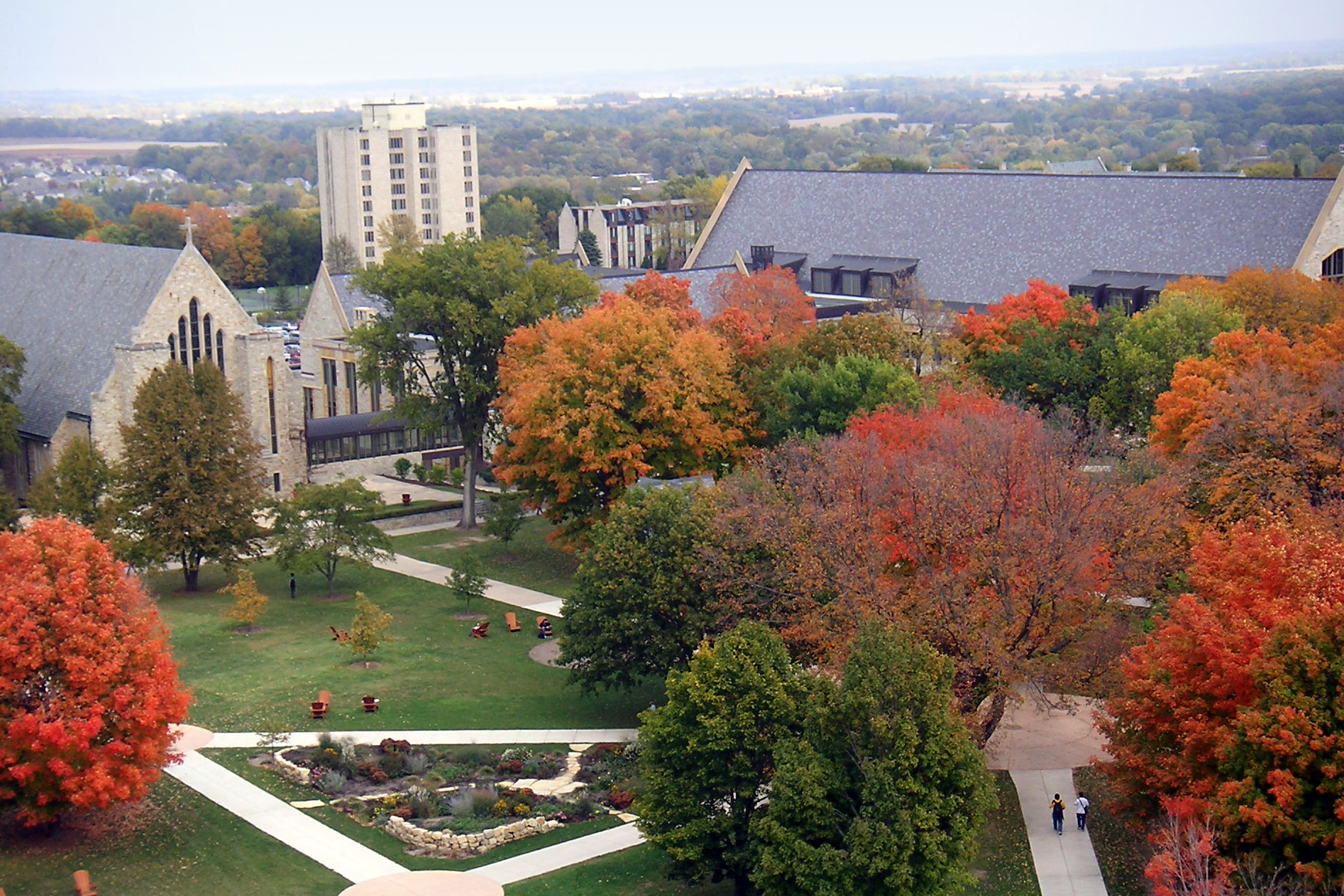
The center of St. Olaf's campus.

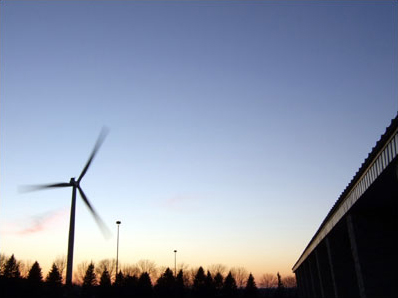
St. Olaf's utility-grade wind turbine directly supplies up to 20% of campus energy needs.

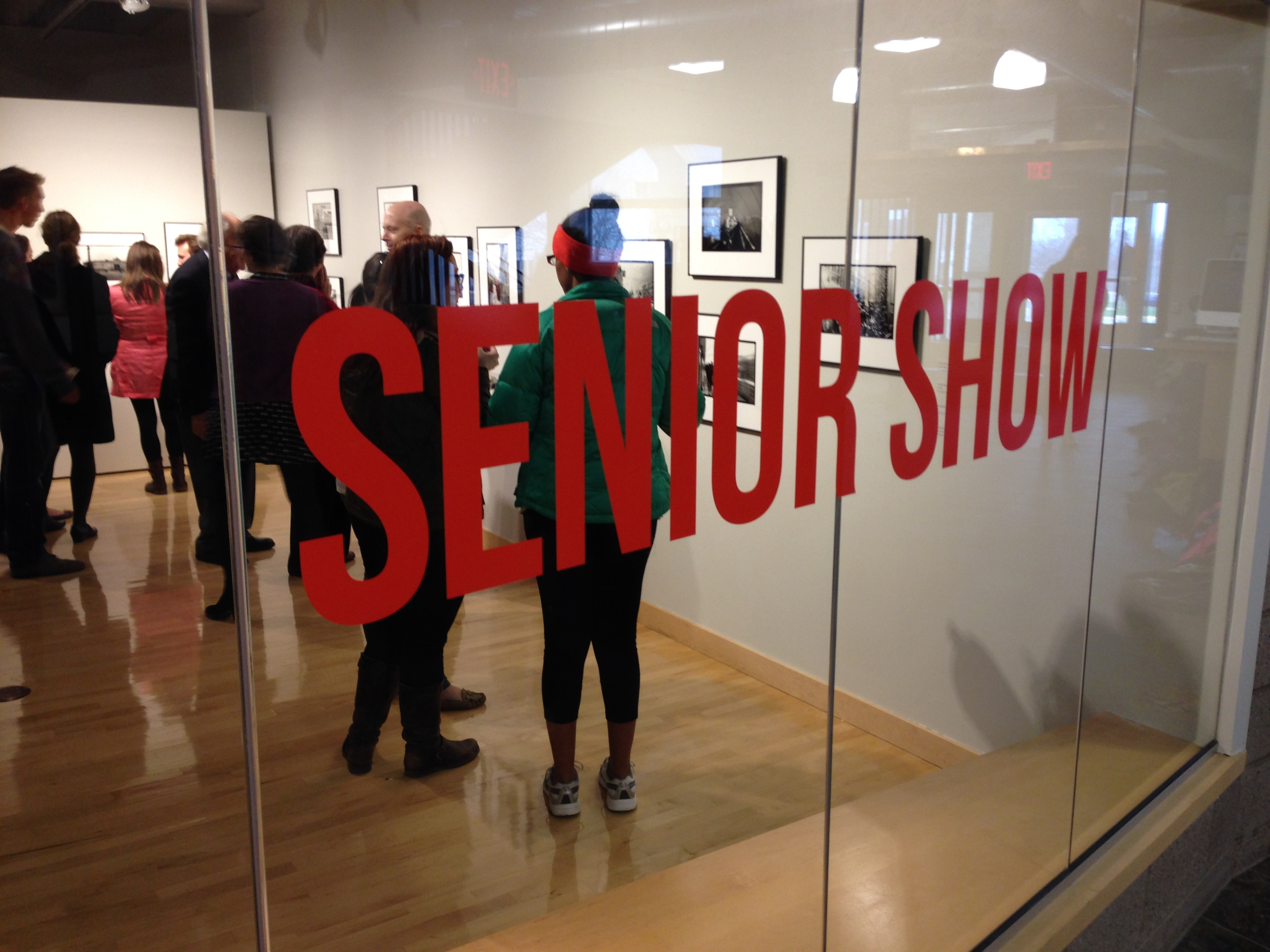
Senior art show at Center for Art and Dance, home of art galleries, classrooms, and studios.

== Student life ==
=== Student organizations ===
More than 250 student organizations are registered at St. Olaf, including academic, athletic, awareness, multicultural, political, religious, service (Alpha Phi Omega) and other special interest groups. Club sports include rowing, men's and women's Ultimate Frisbee, men's and women's rugby, men's and women's lacrosse, badminton, cycling, judo, and fencing. KSTO 93.1 FM is the student-operated radio station and the Olaf Messenger (formerly known as the Manitou Messenger) is the student newspaper. The paper changed its name in 2020 in response to concerns of the appropriation of the word "Manitou" from the language of the original inhabitants of the land the college is built on. Other groups include an on-campus organic farm (STOGROW), an improv comedy troupe (Scared Scriptless), and an EMT (emergency medical technician) organization that is the first responder for campus emergencies. St. Olaf students edit and publish several journals each year, including The Reed, the world's only international undergraduate journal for existential philosophy.

=== Student government ===
St. Olaf's Student Government Association (SGA) finances many student activities and organizations on campus. It operates through 10 branches, each managed by an elected executive: Diversity Celebrations Committee, Volunteer Network, Music Entertainment Committee, Student Activities Committee, Student Organizations Committee, Board of Regents Student Committee, The Pause, After Dark Committee, and Political Awareness Committee. Besides these committees, students can serve in the Student Senate to vote on issues such as constitutional bylaws changes and dorm capital improvement funds and communicate with college administrators about campus issues. SGA also maintains Oleville.com, a website containing information about student activities.

=== Student protests ===
==== Ytterboe the Dog ====
Ytterboe, named after former professor H. T. Ytterboe, was a black dog who became a facet of campus life at St. Olaf in 1942. Fed and cared for by students, the dog became an unofficial mascot. In 1957, Ytterboe the Dog allegedly bit the son of a local police officer Peter Morris. In response, Morris sent two officers to St. Olaf's campus to capture the dog. After he evaded capture, police shot Ytterboe on the library hill, in front of students who were studying for finals. In response, St. Olaf and Carleton students protested, gaining local and national coverage. At the protests, an effigy of the officer who shot Ytterboe was hung from a streetlight and burned. The Minnesota highway patrol was called in to control the protest as students continued demonstrating in Northfield. In response to the protests, the chief of police said, "Nobody loves a dog more than I do. We didn't mean to kill him". St. Olaf President Clemens M. Granskou commented, "As far as I could see, this is one of these tempests in a teacup that usually take place once in a while in the springtime on a college campus".

Initially, the Northfield Police sent Ytterboe's body to a local landfill, but students retrieved it. Afterward, Ytterboe's head was sent to Minneapolis to be tested for rabies; it tested negative. His body was buried on a slope of Manitou Heights the day after he was shot as a crowd of 2,000 students and members of the community gathered to pay their respects.

==== ROTC ====
Between 50 and 75 students from St. Olaf, accompanied by some Carleton students, occupied the St. Olaf administration building on April 16, 1970, demanding that the school cut ties with the ROTC. Students occupied the building until Friday afternoon, ending their occupation when President Sidney Rand came to an agreement with the leaders of the protest. The school moved forward on votes within the administration and the board of regents in return for the cessation of "obstructive demonstration". The St. Olaf protests coincided with a similar occupation at Macalester College.

==== Sexual misconduct ====
In 2016, students protested the school's policies on sexual harassment through a T-shirt campaign. Students donned grey shirts reading "Ask me how my college is protecting my rapist" to draw attention to the school's sexual misconduct policies. Information about the campaign circulated through social media and was soon picked up by local news sources. In response, the Office of Civil Rights of the U.S. Education Department launched an investigation into the college's policies. Soon after, the school officially announced an overhaul of its Title IX policies.

==== Racism ====
In 2017, a series of notes containing threats and racial slurs appeared on campus. In response, students protested for systemic changes to incorporate diversity and inclusion, cultural sensitivity, and hate crime prevention into college policy. As of May 1, 2017, there had been nine reported acts of hate speech during the school year. By occupying campus buildings, blocking entrances to the cafeteria, and boycotting classes, demonstrators pushed the administration to act on a number of demands. The protests prompted the administration to reevaluate its policies, but an investigation found that one of the notes was forged. The forgery undermined the movement for some, but others saw it as a rogue action that did not detract from the progress made.

==== Climate ====
In 2019, St. Olaf students joined over four million people worldwide who participated in the September 2019 climate strikes, a continuation of the school strike for climate movement inspired by Swedish climate activist Greta Thunberg. On September 20, hundreds of St. Olaf students walked out of class and marched into downtown Northfield, where they joined other Northfield citizens to raise awareness of the growing threat of global climate change. The St. Olaf strike was organized by the college's Climate Justice Collective (CJC), a group dedicated to increasing campus awareness of climate issues and pushing St. Olaf to divest its endowment from fossil fuel companies.

== Music program ==
St. Olaf's music program was founded by F. Melius Christiansen in 1903. Its band, choir and orchestra tour the continental United States annually and have made many international tours, typically occurring triennially. The St. Olaf Band was the first American college musical organization to conduct a concert tour abroad when it traveled to Norway in 1906. It was awarded The American Prize in Band/Wind Ensemble Performance, 2021, in the college/university (smaller program) division.

The St. Olaf Choir was founded in 1907 as the St. John's Lutheran Church Choir in Northfield, a collegiate ensemble. It has toured Europe several times, as well as China, Korea, and Australia, performing before heads of state and producing more than a dozen recordings. The choir performs in the nationally broadcast annual St. Olaf Christmas Festival, along with the St. Olaf Orchestra and four of the college's other choirs.

Other student musical ensembles include The St. Olaf Handbell Choir, Chapel Choir, Cantorei, Manitou Singers, Viking Chorus, Collegiate Chorale, Philharmonia, Norseman Band, and many smaller vocal and instrumental ensembles. There are also student-run music ensembles at St. Olaf: Valhalla Band, Naknefeler Orchestra, and the men's and women's a cappella groups: The Limestones, Agnes, and Krossmen. In addition, the Gospel Choir of St. Olaf is one of few Midwest college gospel choirs. These groups are not a part of the college's music program and operate independently.

Ensembles founded at St. Olaf include the Minnesota Symphonic Winds, the Metropolitan Symphony Orchestra, the Copper Street Brass and the a cappella choral groups Cantus, Inpulse, and Magnum Chorum. St. Olaf is also the location of the sacred choral music radio show Sing for Joy.

== Athletics ==
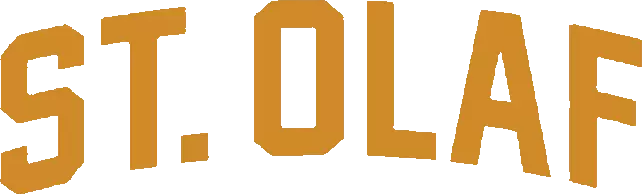
St. Olaf athletics wordmark

St. Olaf's athletic teams are called the /ˈoʊliːz/ OH-leez (singular: /ˈoʊliː/ OH-lee). Their colors are black and gold. The college is a member of the NCAA Division III level of the National Collegiate Athletic Association (NCAA), primarily competing in the Minnesota Intercollegiate Athletic Conference (MIAC) in most sports since the 1974–75 academic year (of which it was also a member from 1920–21 to 1949–50), while its Alpine and Nordic skiing teams compete as Independents. The Oles competed in the Midwest Collegiate Athletic Conference (MCAC, known as the Midwest Conference since 1994–95) from 1952–53 to 1973–74.

St. Olaf competes in 26 intercollegiate varsity sports (13 for men and 13 for women). Men's sports include baseball, basketball, cross country, football, golf, hockey, skiing (Nordic and Alpine), soccer, swimming & diving, tennis, and track & field (indoor and outdoor); women's sports include basketball, cross country, golf, ice hockey, skiing (Nordic and Alpine), soccer, softball, swimming & diving, tennis, track & field (indoor and outdoor), and volleyball. Former sports included men's wrestling.

The St. Olaf men's soccer team won the NCAA Division III men's soccer tournament in 2023, defeating Amherst College 2–1 in overtime. The men's cross country team won the Division III national championship in 2013. The women's Nordic ski team is a 10-time national United States Collegiate Ski and Snowboard Association champion, including four consecutive national team titles from 2022 through 2025.

St. Olaf also has many student-coached club and intramural sports teams that compete within the student body and also inter-college. Notable are the St. Olaf ultimate teams. The men's team is the Berzerkers. The women's team is the Vortex, after changing its name from Durga in 2015).

The Berzerkers won the men's Division III national championship in 2024, defeating Williams College 15–12 in the final of the USA Ultimate Nationals.

The women's ultimate teams have been successful at the national level for many years. In 2011, Durga played at the Division III national tournament in Buffalo, New York, finishing in seventh place. The team also played in the Division III Nationals tournament in 2014. In 2017, Vortex again qualified for the national tournament in Kentucky and placed seventh. In 2018, Vortex won the Division III national championship in Rockford, Illinois, and placed third at the Division III national tournament in 2019 in College Station, Texas, The Vortex had a third-place finish at the 2025 Division III USA Ultimate championships.

The St. Olaf Dance Team supports St. Olaf athletic teams (football, men's/women's soccer and basketball) with halftime performances and competes in intercollegiate events every year. It has performed in the Minnesota Swarm lacrosse team's halftime show and placed third in its division at the 2011 St. Thomas Invitational.

=== Women's Athletic Association ===
Early academic and extracurricular activities at St. Olaf were dominated by men; administrators expected women students to be moral, obedient, and domestic. By 1908, women began organizing unofficial basketball competitions and croquet and tennis matches. The first calisthenics gym for women's use was built in Mohn Hall in 1912, and the first women's physical education program was developed in 1916, after a decade of women contributing to men-only Athletic Union fees. In the early 1920s, the Amateur Athletic Association of England| (WAA) began providing professional advocacy services for women pursuing careers in physical education or organizing team sports. The dominant Athletic Union refused to give women's teams representation in decision-making, initially prevented women from earning varsity letters, and refused to fund the WAA until 1926.

The WAA registered with its national parent organization in 1927, as administrators began to accept the nationally developing collegiate athletic culture. At this time, St. Olaf women began to compete in statewide play days on a noncompetitive basis, hosting the Minnesota WAA play day in 1929. During this period, women continued to protest unequal funding and facilities within the Athletic Union. Historian Judy Kutulas argues that beginning in the 1930s, the WAA began to compete with new Great Depression-era ideas of womanhood, including refinement, dignity, and self-control. To mirror these changes, the organization began to cater to more individual sports, such as table tennis, badminton, darts, and shuffleboard, which women could play as married members of the middle class.

In 1940, the WAA was renamed the Women's Recreational Association (WRA) after a national name change. During the 1940s, the WRA organized co-recreational activities (co-recs), popular for holding dances despite the college's dancing ban. Co-recs increasingly overshadowed single-gender athletic competitions in popularity. During World War II, the WRA organized blood drives and raised money for the war effort. The college offered sports facilities to naval and marine cadets, preventing the WRA from organizing activities. Wartime and postwar attitudes of women pressured WRA members to cater to feminine, service-based, and nurturing activities. Other mixed-gender sports clubs and professional organizations also began to crowd out the WRA, making co-recs one of the WRA's only remaining popular activities. By 1960, dancing was allowed on campus as student culture became more rebellious and political, making co-recs seem tame. By 1967, 95% of women students favored mixed-gender sports, and the WRA disbanded in 1969.

=== Rivalry with Carleton College ===
==== Football ====
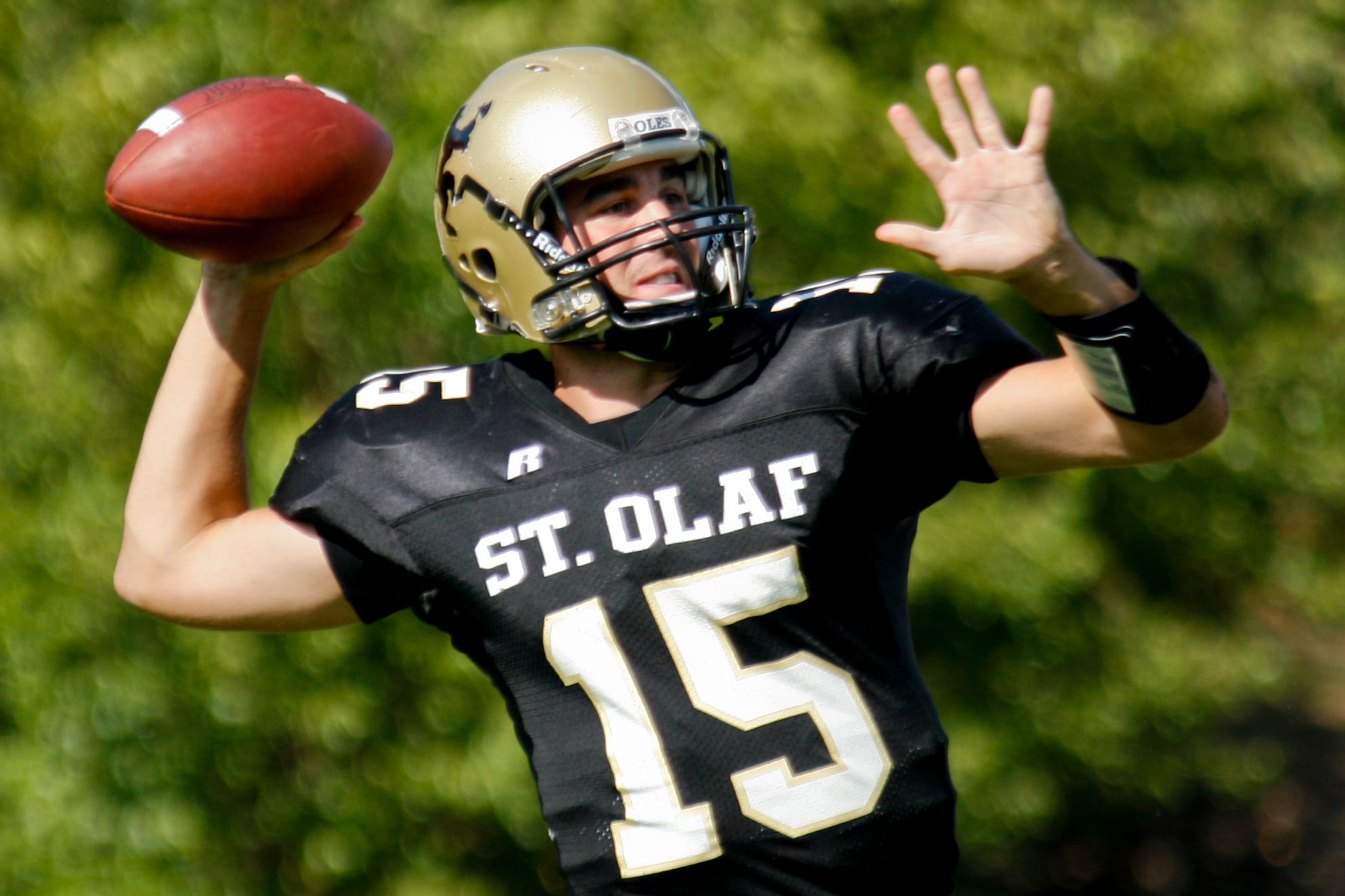
Football at St. Olaf in 2009

St. Olaf is a traditional athletic rival of its crosstown neighbor Carleton College. The annual American football game between the Knights and the Oles was recently dubbed the "Cereal Bowl" in honor of the Malt-O-Meal production facility in Northfield. The annual winner receives the "Goat Trophy", which was created by Minneapolis dentist Ranthus B. Fouch in 1931.

The rivalry between St. Olaf and Carleton began with a Carleton victory over St. Olaf in 1919. A statue of an eagle in Northfield's Civil War Veterans' Memorial (in Bridge Square) is turned to face the college that wins the annual match between the schools.

These football teams are also significant for having played the only NCAA-sanctioned "Liter Bowl" metric football game in history, which St. Olaf won in 1977.

==== Cross country ====
The Great Karhu Shoe Race is an annual rivalry between the cross country teams of Carleton and St. Olaf College. The race was founded in 1972 when Carleton Coach Bill Huyck was in search of a new championship course for the Midwest Conference Meet. St. Olaf coach Bill Thornton agreed to a competition between the runners on each team who were not on the varsity top 7. The varsity athletes were still racing later in the season. The trophy for the 1972 race was a pair of Karhu Shoes worth $10. These shoes have remained the trophy to this day.

Several traditions exist between the St. Olaf and Carleton runners at the race. As the race typically falls near Halloween, many of the runners will often don costumes. The runners for the St. Olaf men use safety pins to attach gummy bears to their shorts, which the Carleton runners attempt to rip off.

==== Volleyball ====
The Battle for the Bell is an annual volleyball rivalry match between St. Olaf and Carleton. The traveling trophy, which goes to the winner of the match, is a cowbell with a wooden handle attached to the closed end.

== Kierkegaard Library ==
The Howard V. and Edna H. Hong Kierkegaard Library is a research collection dedicated to the work of the 19th-century Danish philosopher and theologian Søren Kierkegaard (1813–1855), housed at St. Olaf College, Northfield, Minnesota. Along with the Søren Kierkegaard Research Center at the University of Copenhagen, Denmark, it is one of two internationally significant research facilities devoted to the study of Kierkegaard. The collection began as the private library of Howard V. Hong and Edna H. Hong, assembled during their complete translation of Kierkegaard's writings into English, the first volume of which received the National Book Award. Subsequent curators of the library were philosophers C. Stephen Evans and, from 1995 to 2022, Gordon D. Marino.

The Hongs donated the collection to St. Olaf College in 1976 with the understanding that it be made available as a center for research and publication. The library's current holdings include over 11,000 volumes, 3,500 periodical articles and a partial replication of Kierkegaard's personal library as well as titles Kierkegaard might have had access to during his lifetime. It hosts visiting researchers throughout the year (including an active summer fellows program) and periodic conferences and research seminars. Activities in the summer include Danish courses and an International Conference every fourth year. Yearlong Kierkegaard Fellowships see scholars living in St. Olaf's Kierkegaard House. The library's director is St. Olaf College philosophy faculty member Anna Louise Strelis Söderquist.

St. Olaf students edit and publish The Reed, an undergraduate journal of existential philosophy, from the library. The Reed began in 1998, and since then has published articles from undergraduates across the globe every year.

== Flaten Art Museum ==
St. Olaf is home to the Flaten Art Museum, in the Center for Art and Dance. The museum holds over 4,000 works on rotating display to the public. The vast majority of the works were received through donations, but a few were purchased. The museum also displays senior studio majors' work at the end of the year to give them experience in having artwork displayed in a professional setting.

=== Poster collection ===
In 2015 St. Olaf accepted a collection of 147 rare World War II-era propaganda posters as part of a donation from the estate of Richard N. Tetlie. The posters were created by the Nazi regime and the Vichy French government for display across occupied Europe and were collected by Major Duncan Emrich, historian for General Dwight D. Eisenhower, during the liberation of Europe. The collection provides insight into how the Nazis and their allies attempted to foster racial ideology, encourage distrust of the Allies, and rally support for their cause by manipulating the fear, anxiety, traditions, and political circumstances of the people in the occupied territories. The museum contacted the Midwest Art Conservation Center for a full assessment of the collection in hopes that the posters can be restored. They could then be used in exhibits and as resources to teach about the dangers of propaganda and extremism.

== Notable alumni ==
Notable St. Olaf alumni include civil rights activist James Reeb '50, AIA Gold Award-winning architect Edward Sövik '39, Minnesota Governor Al Quie '50, Oscar-winning screenwriter Barry Morrow '70, Pulitzer Prize-winning journalist Gretchen Morgenson '76, and writers Ole Rolvaag 1905, Siri Hustvedt '77 (winner of the Princess of Asturias Award in Letters), and ornithologist Margaret Sordahl. Game designer Jonathan Tweet studied at the college, as did the first female major league baseball coach, Justine Siegal. Raffi Freedman-Gurspan graduated in 2009 with a Bachelor of Arts in political science and Norwegian. Andrew Volstead 1881 introduced the National Prohibition Act to Congress in 1919. Cheryl Willman is an American cancer researcher and the executive director of Mayo Clinic Cancer Programs.

Ernest Lawrence, recipient of the 1939 Nobel Prize in Physics, studied for a year at St. Olaf.

== See also ==
- List of St. Olaf College people
- List of colleges and universities in Minnesota
- Higher education in Minnesota
- Halvor Halvorson Quie
