= List of St. Olaf College people =

This list of St. Olaf people contains links to Wikipedia articles about notable alumni and other people connected to St. Olaf College, a private liberal arts college in Northfield, Minnesota.

== Notable alumni ==
=== Composers and conductors ===
- Anton Armstrong, class of 1978
- David Boe, class of 1958
- Abbie Betinis, class of 2001
- Olaf Christiansen, class of 1925
- Paul J. Christiansen, class of 1934
- René Clausen, class of 1974
- Bradley Ellingboe, class of 1980
- Jocelyn Hagen, class of 2003
- Kenneth Jennings, class of 1950
- Craig Hella Johnson, class of 1984
- Timothy Mahr, class of 1978
- Matthew Peterson, class of 2006
- Frank Pooler, class of 1948
- Marie Pooler, class of 1950
- Dale Warland, class of 1954
- Kurt Westerberg, class of 1972

=== Politicians, statesmen and judges ===
- Russell A. Anderson, class of 1964, former chief justice of the Minnesota Supreme Court
- August H. Andresen, class of 1912, former United States representative from Minnesota
- Arnie Arnesen, class of 1975, fellow of Harvard Institute of Politics and former member of New Hampshire House of Representatives
- David Bly, class of 1974, former member of the Minnesota House of Representatives
- Monthian Buntan, class of 1990, Thai politician
- Satveer Chaudhary, class of 1991, former member of the Minnesota State legislature
- Nathan Coulter, class of 2008, member of Minnesota House of Representatives
- Raymond Cox, class of 1974, former member of the Minnesota House of Representatives
- Kim Elton, class of 1968, former member of the Alaska Senate
- Arlen Erdahl, class of 1953, former United States representative from Minnesota
- Joan Ericksen, class of 1977, judge of the United States District Court for the District of Minnesota
- Alex Falconer, class of 2003, member of Minnesota House of Representatives
- Tom Fiebiger, class of 1978, former member of the North Dakota Senate
- Mary Forsythe, class of 1922, former member of Minnesota House of Representatives
- David Gottfried, class of 2015, member of Minnesota House of Representatives
- Harold Hagen, class of 1927, former United States representative from Minnesota
- John L. Helgerson, class of 1966, former CIA Inspector General
- Karla Hult, class of 1995, member of the Minnesota Senate
- Ember Reichgott Junge, class of 1974, former member of the Minnesota Senate
- Ian C. Kelly, class of 1977, US ambassador to Georgia and US ambassador to OSCE
- David Knutson, class of 1982, former member of the Minnesota Senate
- Bruce Laingen, class of 1947, former United States ambassador to Malta, 1977–1979
- John Marty, class of 1978, member of the Minnesota Senate
- Jim Meffert, class of 1989, U.S. Congressional candidate (2010)
- David Minge, class of 1963, former United States representative from Minnesota
- Karl F. Rolvaag, class of 1941, 31st governor of Minnesota
- Tom Saxhaug, class of 1970, former member of the Minnesota Senate
- Erik Paulsen, class of 1987, former United States representative from Minnesota
- Kristi Pursell, class of 2003, member of the Minnesota House of Representatives
- Al Quie, class of 1950, 35th governor of Minnesota
- Gretchen Quie, class of 1971, former first lady of Minnesota
- Theodor S. Slen, class of 1912, former member of the Minnesota House of Representatives
- Steve Sviggum, class of 1979, former speaker of the Minnesota House of Representatives
- Arthur E. Thompson, class of 1915, former North Dakota superintendent of Public Instruction
- George Thompson, class of 1940, 35th attorney general of Wisconsin
- Eric C. Tostrud, class of 1987, judge of the United States District Court for the District of Minnesota
- J. B. Van Hollen, class of 1988, 43rd attorney general of Wisconsin
- Andrew Volstead, class of 1881, former member of the US House of Representatives for Minnesota, introduced National Prohibition Act
- Jay Xiong, class of 2010, member of the Minnesota House of Representatives

=== Writers ===
- Robert Bly, class of 1950 (transferred out), leader of the Mythopoetic men's movement
- Frank Bures, class of 1995
- Kristina Halvorson, class of 1993
- Erin Hart, class of 1980
- Michelle Hoover, class of 1994
- Siri Hustvedt, class of 1977
- Kij Johnson, class of 1982
- Peg Kerr, class of 1982
- Sarah Lindsay, class of 1980
- Timothy Mason, class of 1972, playwright
- Loran Nordgren, class of 2001, behavioral scientist and author
- Danel Olson, class of 1983
- David Oppegaard, class of 2002
- Emily Rapp, class of 1996
- Chris Raschka, class of 1981
- Mark Rein-Hagen, class of 1988, author of Vampire: The Masquerade
- Ole Rolvaag, class of 1905, author of Giants in the Earth

=== Religion ===
- Johan Arnd Aasgaard, class of 1898, Lutheran church leader
- Stuart E. Barstad, class of 1951, chief of chaplains of the United States Air Force 1985–1988
- Carl Braaten, class of 1951, Lutheran theologian
- David Ede, class of 1957, American scholar of Islam
- Alan M. Olson, class of 1961, philosopher, Boston University, 1974–2013
- James Reeb, class of 1950, minister, pastor, and civil rights activist, 1927–1965
- Fredrik A. Schiotz, class of 1924, former president of the Lutheran World Federation

=== Other ===
- Dean Buntrock, class of 1955, founder and former chairman and CEO of Waste Management, Inc. and largest school benefactor
- Jake Christiansen, class of 1924, football coach and namesake of Jake Christiansen Stadium
- Frank Cleve, class of 1924, minor-league baseball player, football and basketball coach
- Maren Costa, class of 1991, co-founder of Amazon Employees for Climate Justice
- Amanda Cox, class of 2001, editor of the "Upshot" section of the New York Times
- Jason DeRose, class of 1997, Western Bureau chief for National Public Radio News
- Anthony Dexter, class of 1935, actor
- John Enemark, class of 1962, biochemist
- Nicholas Epley, class of 1996, professor and author
- Willis H. Flygare, class of 1958, chemist credited with "outstanding contributions to the understanding of molecular electronic structure"
- Raffi Freedman-Gurspan, class of 2009, first openly transgender person to work as a White House staffer
- Kristine Gebbie, class of 1965, public health official and United States AIDS policy coordinator, 1993–1994
- Roger Grimsby, class of 1950, television news anchor
- Einar Haugen, class of 1928, Harvard professor of Scandinavian and linguistics
- Diane Havlir, class of 1980, AIDS researcher
- Kelly Kaduce, class of 1996, operatic soprano
- George L. Kelling, class of 1956, criminologist and co-developer of the Broken Windows Theory
- Neil A. Kjos Jr., class of 1953, former president of the Neil A. Kjos Music Company
- Henrietta Larson, class of 1918, first female assistant professor at Harvard Business School
- Gretchen Morgenson, class of 1976, Pulitzer Prize-winning journalist
- Barry Morrow, class of 1970, Oscar-winning screenwriter
- Elizabeth Nabel, class of 1974, cardiologist and former director of the National Heart, Lung, and Blood Institute
- Martha Nause, class of 1977, professional golfer
- Kenneth Neilson, class of 1970, banker and businessman
- Judith Nelson, class of 1961, operatic soprano
- Jack Nelson-Pallmeyer, class of 1973, academic and U.S. Senate candidate (2008)
- Mark W. Olson, class of 1965, economist and former member of the Federal Reserve Board of Governors
- Anna Palmer, class of 2004, co-founder and CEO of Punchbowl News
- Barbara Peterson, class of 1977, Miss USA 1976 and president of the Burwell Family Foundation
- Helen Piwnica-Worms, class of 1979, cancer researcher and Vice Provost for science at the M.D. Anderson Cancer Center
- Tom Porter, class of 1951, football and ice hockey coach
- Mary Reid Kelley, class of 2001, visual artist
- David L. Rose, class of 1989, tech entrepreneur and inventor
- David Rysdahl, class of 2009, actor
- Susan Seacrest, class of 1975, environmental activist and teacher
- Justine Siegal, class of 1998, first woman to coach a professional men's baseball team
- H. P. Skoglund, class of 1925, businessman and co-founder of the Minnesota Vikings
- Edward Sövik, class of 1939, architect and later St. Olaf faculty member
- Lisa Stevens, class of 1986, RPG designer and CEO
- Ward Sutton, class of 1989, cartoonist and illustrator, 2018 Herblock Award winner
- Jonathan Tweet, class of 1987, game designer and author
- Cheryl Willman, class of 1977, cancer researcher and executive director of Mayo Clinic Cancer Programs

=== Fictional ===
- Jay Gatsby, titular character of F. Scott Fitzgerald's novel The Great Gatsby; attended for two weeks, did not graduate

== Notable faculty ==
- Mark Almli, minor-league baseball player, St. Olaf baseball, football and basketball coach
- Anton Armstrong, class of 1978, conductor of the St. Olaf Choir
- F. Melius Christiansen, founder of the St. Olaf Choir
- John Ferguson, organist and composer
- Dave Hauck, swimming coach for St. Olaf College for over 40 years, 1973–2016, winning 43 Minnesota Conference (MIAC) championships; served 30 years as assistant football coach, nine as men's gymnastic's coach, seven as men's golf coach, and six as softball coach
- Kenneth Jennings, class of 1950, composer and former conductor of the St. Olaf Choir
- Robert Jenson, theologian
- Chris Meidt, head football coach (2002–2007), assistant coach with Washington Commanders
- Anantanand Rambachan, Hindu scholar
- Ole Rolvaag, class of 1905, author
- Edward Sövik, class of 1939, architect and later St. Olaf faculty member
- Lynn Steen, mathematician
- Charles Taliaferro, philosopher
