= 2006 Minnesota's 5th congressional district election =

- November 7, 2006
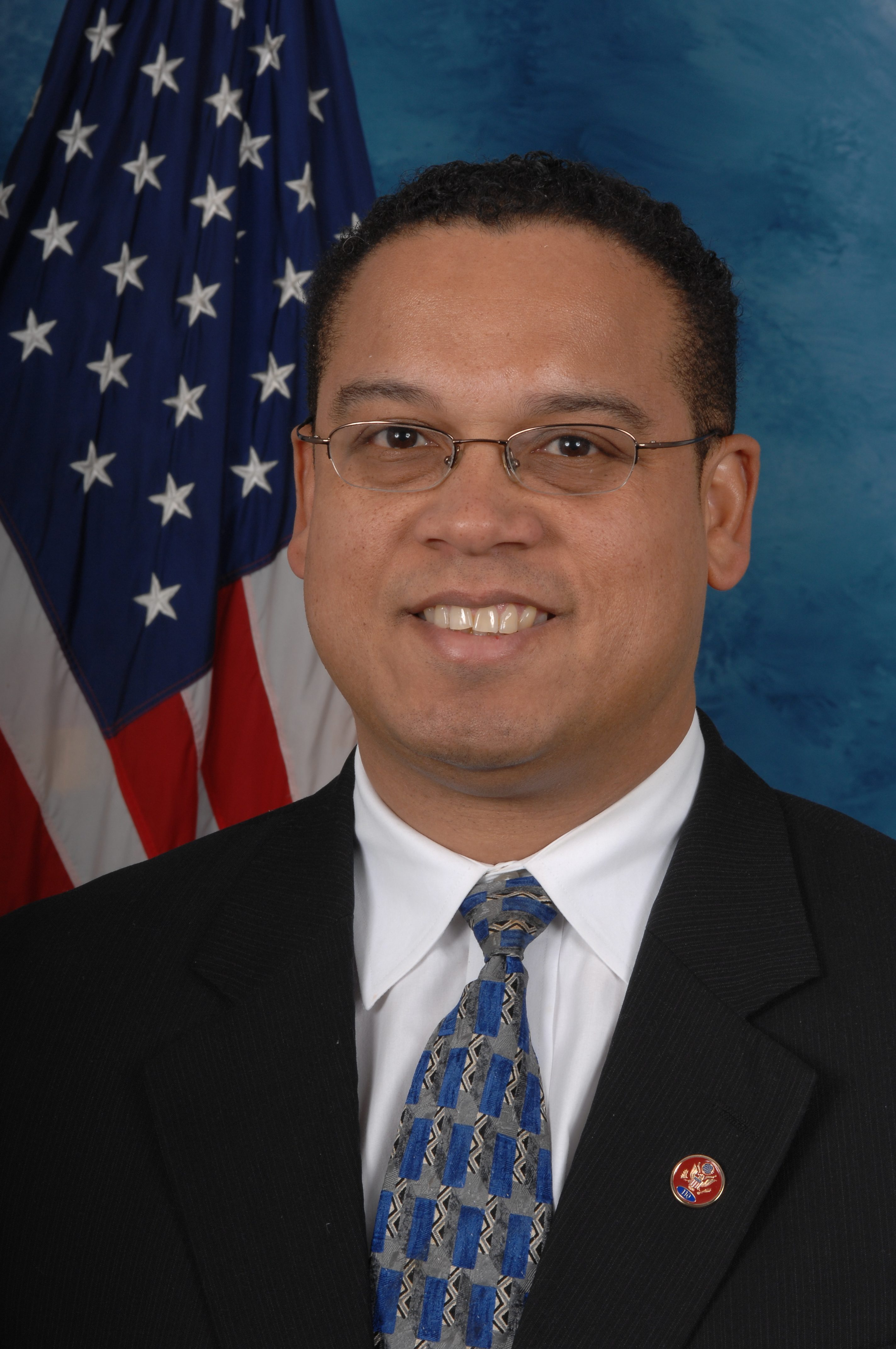

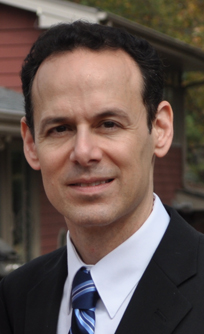

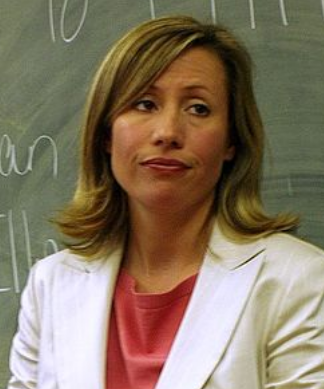
Nominee	Keith Ellison	Alan Fine	Tammy Lee
Party	Democratic	Republican	Independence
Popular vote	136,060	52,263	51,456
Percentage	55.6%	21.3%	21.0%
- Precinct results Ellison: 30–40% 40–50% 50–60% 60–70% 70–80% 80–90% >90% Fine: 30–40% 40–50% Lee: 30–40%
U.S. Representative before election
Martin Olav Sabo
Democratic
Elected U.S. Representative
Keith Ellison
Democratic

The 2006 Minnesota's 5th congressional district election was an election for the United States House of Representatives for the open seat of incumbent Martin Olav Sabo (DFL), who retired after serving the Minneapolis-based district for 28 years.

Sabo, who had rarely faced a serious electoral challenge, won reelection with 70% of the vote in 2004 in a district that went for John Kerry by 71% in the presidential election. The seat had elected candidates of the Minnesota Democratic-Farmer-Labor Party (DFL) since 1962 and was rated "Safe Democratic" by CQ Politics.

Sabo's surprising announcement in March 2006 prompted many area Democrats to enter the race. While state representative Keith Ellison received the party's endorsement, he was not backed by Sabo and faced stiff primary competition from former Sabo aide Mike Erlandson, among others. Having won the primary, Ellison handily defeated Republican nominee, business consultant Alan Fine, and the Independence nominee, businesswoman Tammy Lee, in the general election.

== Democratic-Farmer-Labor primary ==
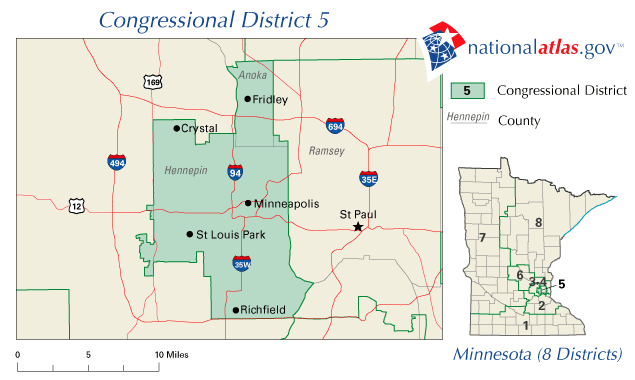
Minnesota's 5th congressional district

=== Candidates ===
==== Received nomination ====
- Keith Ellison, state representative

==== Defeated in primary ====
- Mike Erlandson, former state chair of the Minnesota Democratic-Farmer-Labor Party; former Chief of Staff to Martin Olav Sabo
- Andrew Vincent Favorite, businessman and former U.S. Navy reservist
- Gregg A. Iverson, perennial candidate and U.S. Army veteran
- Ember Reichgott Junge, former state senator
- Paul Ostrow, member of the Minneapolis City Council
- Patrick J. Wiles, former member of the United Auto Workers Local 879 executive board

==== Withdrew before primary ====
- Gail Dorfman, member of the Hennepin County Commission (endorsed Ellison)
- Anne Knapp, former assistant commissioner for the Department of Employment Security (endorsed Saavedra)
- Jack Nelson-Pallmeyer, associate professor of Justice and Peace Studies at the University of St. Thomas (endorsed Ellison)
- Jon Olson, president of the Minneapolis Parks Board
- Jorge Saavedra, attorney (endorsed Ellison)
- Gary Schiff, member of the Minneapolis City Council
- Erik Thompson, activist (ran in the 7th congressional district)

==== Declined to run ====
- Mark Andrew, former chairman of the Minnesota Democratic-Farmer-Labor Party
- Sharon Sayles Belton, former mayor of Minneapolis
- Scott Benson, member of the Minneapolis City Council
- Satveer Chaudhary, state senator
- Scott Dibble, state senator (endorsed Dorfman)
- Betty Folliard, former state representative
- Lisa Goodman, member of the Minneapolis City Council
- Margaret Anderson Kelliher, state representative (endorsed Ellison)
- Peter McLaughlin, member of the Hennepin County Commission
- Mike Opat, member of the Hennepin County Commission (endorsed Dorfman, then Erlandson)
- R.T. Rybak, mayor of Minneapolis
- Julie Sabo, former state senator

=== DFL endorsement ===
Before Sabo announced his retirement, he was already being challenged for the party endorsement by professor and anti-Iraq War activist Jack Nelson-Pallmeyer. Nelson-Pallmeyer's campaign was considered to have little to no chance of succeeding. When Sabo announced his retirement several candidates entered the race, seeking the DFL endorsement to replace him. Hennepin County commissioner Gail Dorfman announced her campaign for the seat on March 21, 2006, becoming the first woman to enter the campaign, and assumed the status of one of the frontrunners due to her strong fundraising record.

At the district convention in May, state representative Keith Ellison won the DFL endorsement after four ballots. Ellison winning the endorsement was considered a surprise, as election analysts had predicted a close race between him, Dorfman and former DFL chair Mike Erlandson, but instead Ellison came away with a convincing margin of victory, with Dorfman in second and Erlandson in fourth, behind Nelson-Pallmeyer. After being heckled by delegates for refusing to commit to endorsing the winner of the convention, Erlandson left the building and decided to run in the primary anyway. This action angered DFL chair Brian Melendez, who accused Erlandson of disloyalty.

=== Primary election ===
In the September primary, the retiring Sabo backed Erlandson. Ellison and Erlandson were joined by state senator Ember Reichgott Junge and Minneapolis City Councillor Paul Ostrow in the primary race, along with several minor candidates.

Junge was widely considered the most moderate candidate, and her campaign was largely focused around healthcare, while Ellison was focused on turning out traditionally overlooked voters, like Somali Americans and members of the LGBT community. However, Ellison's campaign suffered from numerous controversies, such as revelations that he had failed to pay back parking tickets, and that in the early 90s he had written articles praising the Nation of Islam. Erlandson attacked both Ellison and Junge, drawing attention to the controversies Ellison had been involved in, and criticising Junge for numerous votes she had made while a state senator and for being the Minnesota chair of Joe Lieberman's 2004 presidential campaign. Erlandson also emphasised his supposed ability to work with other elected Democrats in order to pass legislation. Ellison went on to win the September 12 primary with 41% of the vote.

=== Debates ===
2006 Minnesota's 5th congressional district Democratic primary debates
No.	Date & time	Host	Moderator	Link	Participants							
Key: P Participant A Absent N Non-invitee W Withdrawn												
Key: P Participant A Absent N Non-invitee W Withdrawn					Gail Dorfman	Keith Ellison	Mike Erlandson	Jack Nelson-Pallmeyer	Ember Reichgott Junge	Paul Ostrow	Jorge Saavedra	Gary Schiff
1	April 24, 2006				P	P	P	P	P	A	P	P
2	July 24, 2006	KFAI, Insight News			W	P	P	W	P	P	W	W
3	July 25, 2006	Temple Israel Minneapolis	David Schlecter		W	P	P	W	P	P	W	W
4	August 24, 2006	Minnesota Public Radio			W	P	P	W	P	P	W	W

=== Endorsements ===
Gail Dorfman (withdrawn)

State officials

- Scott Dibble, state senator

Local officials

- Mike Opat, member of the Hennepin County Commission (later endorsed Erlandson)
Keith Ellison

Executive officials

- Walter Mondale, former vice president of the United States

State officials

- Connie Bernardy, state representative
- Frank Hornstein, state representative
- Phyllis Kahn, state representative
- Margaret Anderson Kelliher, state representative
- Allan Spear, former state senator, former president of the Minnesota Senate

Local officials

- R. T. Rybak, mayor of Minneapolis

Individuals

- Samuel L. Kaplan, businessman and attorney
- Jack Nelson-Pallmeyer, associate professor of Justice and Peace Studies at the University of St. Thomas

Labor unions

- AFL-CIO
- American Federation of State, County and Municipal Employees
- International Brotherhood of Teamsters
- National Education Association
- Service Employees International Union

Organizations

- Clean Water Action
- Minnesota Democratic-Farmer-Labor Party
- Sierra Club
Mike Erlandson

Federal officials

- Wendell Anderson, former U.S. senator from Minnesota and former governor of Minnesota
- John Murtha, U.S. representative from PA-12
- Martin Olav Sabo, U.S. representative from MN-05

State officials

- Ted Mondale, former state senator

Local officials

- Patrick D. McGowan, sheriff of Hennepin County and former state senator
- Mike Opat, member of the Hennepin County Commission

Labor unions

- United Transportation Union

Organizations

- League of Conservation Voters
- National Association of Home Builders
- National Association of Realtors

Newspapers and publications

- Star Tribune
Ember Reichgott Junge

Labor unions

- Fraternal Order of Police

Organizations

- EMILY's List
- National Women's Political Caucus

Newspapers and publications

- Lavender Magazine
Paul Ostrow

Local officials

- Albert Hofstede, former mayor of Minneapolis

Labor unions

- International Association of Fire Fighters Local 82

Organizations

- American Diabetes Association
- Business and Professional Women's Foundation

=== Results ===
Democratic primary
Party	Candidate	Votes	%
Democratic (DFL)	Keith Ellison	29,003	41.21
Democratic (DFL)	Mike Erlandson	21,857	31.06
Democratic (DFL)	Ember Reichgott Junge	14,454	20.54
Democratic (DFL)	Paul Ostrow	3,795	5.39
Democratic (DFL)	Andrew Vincent Favorite	470	0.67
Democratic (DFL)	Gregg A. Iverson	448	0.64
Democratic (DFL)	Patrick J. Wiles	347	0.49
Total votes		70,374	100.00

== Republican primary ==
Despite the heavy Democratic lean of the 5th district, Republicans were hopeful that with Sabo's retirement, their candidate would perform well. Before Sabo announced his retirement, two Republicans had already announced campaigns, Tim Anderson and James Turnham. However, by May 3, both had dropped out, with Turnham citing "some unfortunate circumstances" as his reason for doing so, paving the way for business consultant Alan Fine to receive the party's nomination. Viewed as a moderate Republican, Fine was pro-choice, and his campaign was noted in its early days for its gentleness, with Fine himself often playing the piano at campaign events.

=== Candidates ===
- Alan Fine, business consultant and senior lecturer at the Carlson School of Management

==== Withdrawn ====
- Tim Anderson
- James Turnham

=== Results ===
Republican primary
Party	Candidate	Votes	%
Republican	Alan Fine	7,352	100.00
Total votes		7,352	100.00

== Independence primary ==
Independence primary
Party	Candidate	Votes	%
Independence	Tammy Lee	1,086	100.00
Total votes		1,086	100.00

== General election ==
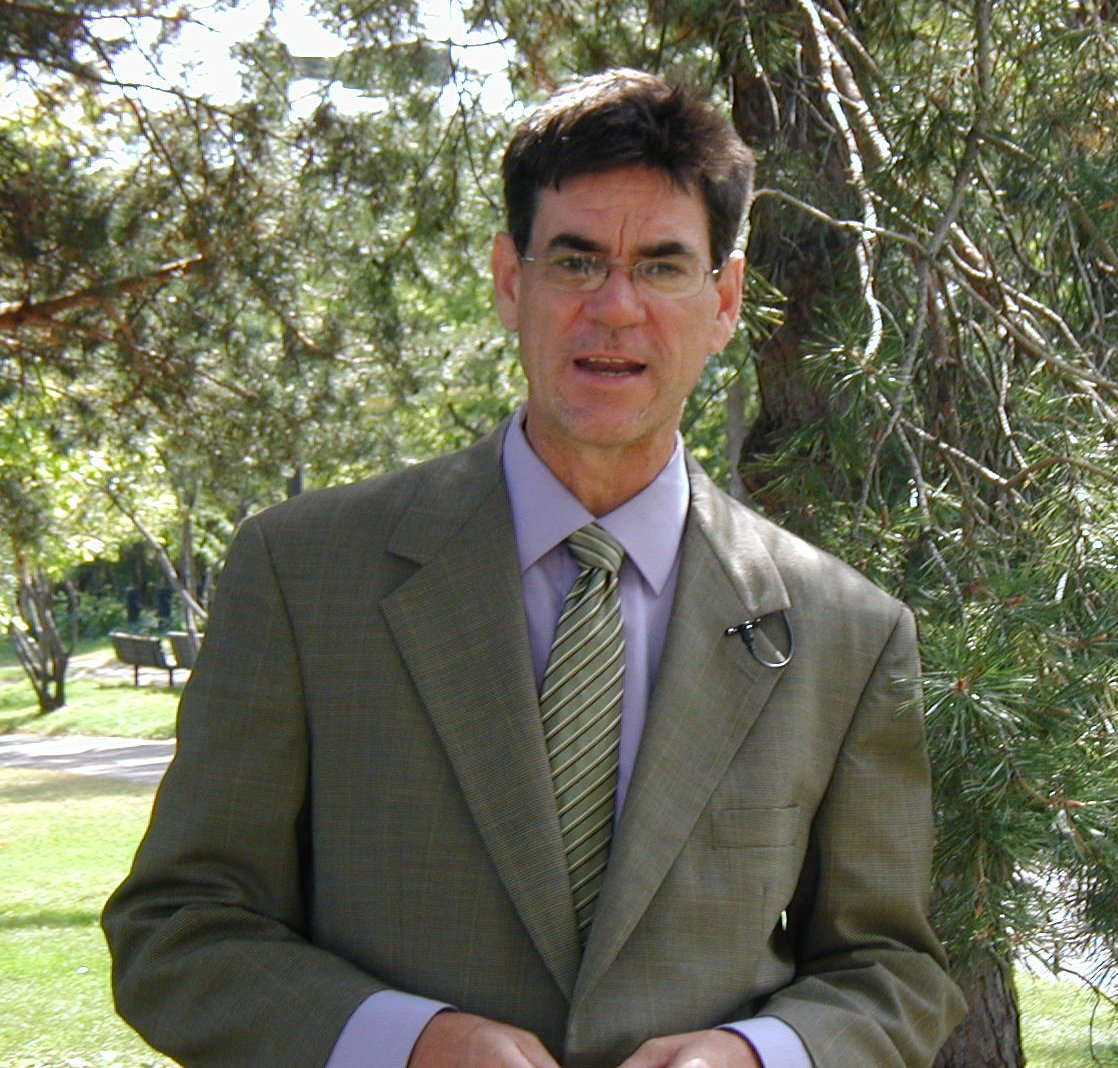
Jay Pond

=== Candidates ===
- Keith Ellison (Democratic-Farmer-Labor), state representative
- Alan Fine (Republican), business consultant and senior lecturer at the Carlson School of Management
- Tammy Lee (Independence), businesswoman; former press secretary for U.S. Senator Byron Dorgan
- Larry Leininger (White Working Man's), janitor and candidate for mayor of Minneapolis in 2001 (write-in)
- Jay Pond (Green), political scientist; Green nominee for CA-08 in 2002 and MN-05 in 2004
- Julian Santana (Socialist Workers), meat packer (write-in)

=== Campaign ===
Following Ellison's victory in the DFL primary, Fine and Lee immediately started campaigning. Ellison promised to run a campaign on the "issues", and accused his opponents of attempting to steer the conversation towards his controversies because "on the issues they're in... big trouble". Ellison also attempted to de-emphasise his religion while campaigning. Fine's campaign largely focused on Ellison's past ties to the Nation of Islam and Louis Farrakhan, while Lee's campaign emphasised her fiscal centrism, declaring that Fine was too conservative to beat Ellison. In contrast to Fine and Lee, Pond declared that Ellison was insufficiently liberal, stating that he had not been fast enough to denounce the Iraq War. However, Pond largely failed to gain traction, which was attributed to Ellison's staunch progressivism drawing off left-wing support that Pond might otherwise have received.

In contrast to the genial tone his campaign had taken during the primaries, Fine's general election campaign took a staunchly combative turn. Special attention was drawn to Fine's comments after Ellison had won the primary, when he stated "I’m extremely concerned about Keith Ellison, Keith Hakim, Keith X Ellison, Keith Ellison Muhammad", referring to various pseudonyms Ellison had used when he was in college. These remarks were seen by some as racist, and one of Fine's brothers, Robert Fine, wrote a letter to Ellison denouncing his brother's comments. Fine's campaign was also wracked by allegations that he had abused his former wife in 1995, first revealed in a story by Star Tribune reporter Rochelle Olson. Fine strongly denied the allegations, claiming that Olson had ties to Ellison, and accused the Star Tribune of trying to "rig the election".

Lee capitalized on Ellison's controversies by securing endorsements from a coalition of Minnesota Democrats, including Kathleen Anderson, Sabo's long-time district director. Anderson labelled Ellison a "scofflaw" and stated that Lee was the only candidate "honorable" enough to carry on Sabo's legacy. Lee's campaign was largely focused around winning voters in the more moderate, suburban area of South Minneapolis. As the campaign continued, Lee was widely considered to be in second place, and several Republican officials attempted to convince Fine to drop out of the race in order to prevent the anti-Ellison vote from being split, but he refused.

Media coverage of the race outside of Minnesota largely focused around Ellison's status as the possible first Muslim member of the United States Congress. This focus was criticised both by Ellison's campaign and by Columbia Journalism Review, which found that the media was shoehorning Ellison's religion into articles where it was not relevant, and that the media was not giving anything other than a surface-level depiction of Islam, noting that only the St. Petersburg Times had stated whether Ellison was a Shia or Sunni in their coverage. In contrast, Columbia Journalism Review praised the Star Tribune's coverage of the race, finding that it was more substantial than the coverage in newspapers based outside of Minnesota. Fine strongly criticised the media's coverage of the race, stating that they had not covered Ellison's controversies enough and that they were not discussing the political positions of the candidates.

=== Sabo's support ===
During the primary run, departing Representative Sabo had endorsed and donated money to the campaign of his longtime chief of staff, Mike Erlandson. When Ellison won the primary and his campaign manager contacted him, Sabo said that he "wouldn't be supporting anyone in the race". Sabo donated funds to the general election campaigns of many Minnesota Democrats, including Coleen Rowley, Patty Wetterling, Tim Walz, and Amy Klobuchar, but none to Ellison. Several Democrats were disappointed with Sabo's refusal to endorse Ellison. Sabo allowed a picture of himself with Lee to be used in her campaign literature, and in response to this an anonymous individual set up a site designed to look like Lee's campaign website, wherein they accused Sabo of being motivated by racism in his refusal to endorse Ellison. This website was later revealed to have been created by activist Chris Stewart, who in 2006 was elected to the Minneapolis Board of Education.

=== Debates ===
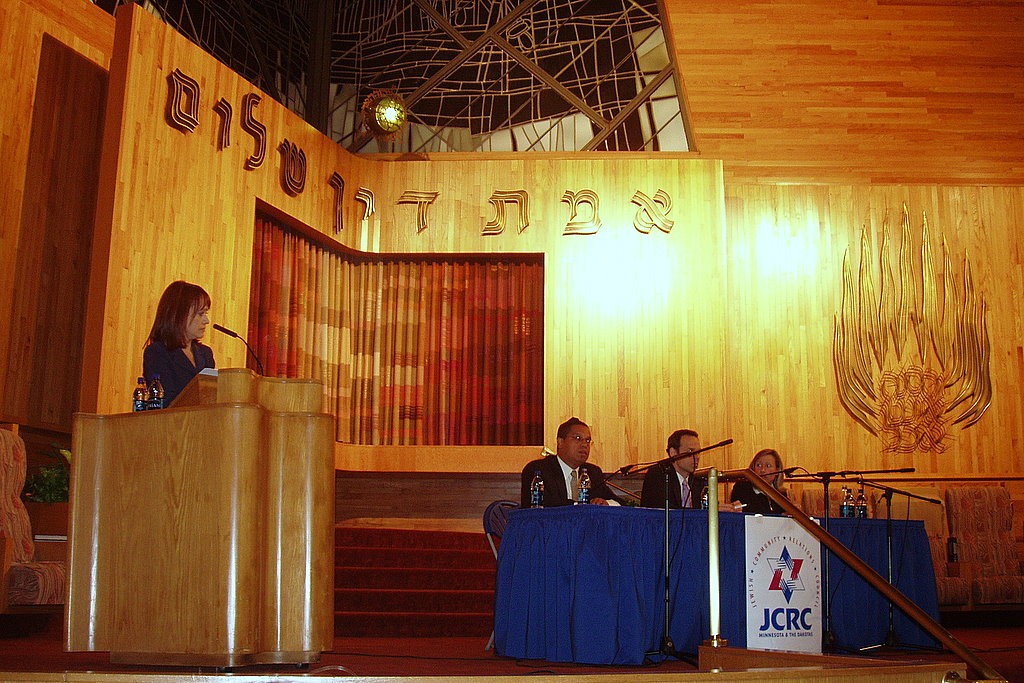
Ellison, Fine and Lee debate at Beth El Synagogue on October 17, 2006.

There were several debates held over the course of the race, along with numerous forums.

On October 17 two debates were held on the same night, one hosted by Air America and one hosted by the Beth El synagogue. All four major candidates on the ballot were invited to the Air America debate, though Fine did not attend. Pond was not invited to the Beth El debate, though he did attend it as a member of the audience, and upon seeing him Ellison and Lee escorted him onto the stage in order for him to participate. However, the debate officials refused to allow him to do so, and Pond returned to his seat. In an analysis of the Beth El debate, journalist and blogger David Zingler stated that Fine was the "least impressive" debater, finding that he was answering questions with "rambling dissertations that border on incoherent".

Shortly prior to the fourth debate, which was held by several student groups at the University of Minnesota, Julian Santana, who was running a write-in campaign for the seat as the nominee of the Socialist Workers Party, unexpectedly showed up, and was allowed to participate. Lee was widely regarded as the winner of the debate, though Pond was also regarded as having a strong performance.

2006 Minnesota's 5th congressional district general election debates
No.	Date & time	Host	Moderator	Link	Participants				
Key: P Participant A Absent N Non-invitee									
Key: P Participant A Absent N Non-invitee					Keith Ellison	Alan Fine	Tammy Lee	Jay Pond	Julian Santana
1	September 15, 2006	Minnesota Public Radio	Gary Eichten		P	P	P	N	N
2	October 17, 2006	Air America			P	A	P	P	N
3	October 17, 2006	Beth El Synagogue	Esme Murphy		P	P	P	N	N
4	October 18, 2006	University of Minnesota	Joel Kindler		P	P	P	P	P

=== Predictions ===
Source	Ranking	As of
The Cook Political Report	Safe D	November 6, 2006
Rothenberg	Safe D	November 6, 2006
Sabato's Crystal Ball	Safe D	November 6, 2006
Real Clear Politics	Safe D	November 7, 2006
CQ Politics	Safe D	November 7, 2006

=== Endorsements ===
Keith Ellison (DFL)

Executive officials

- Walter Mondale, 42nd vice president of the United States; Democratic nominee for president in 1984

Federal officials

- Jesse Jackson, minister, former shadow U.S. senator from the District of Columbia; Candidate for president in 1984 and 1988
- Betty McCollum, U.S. representative from MN-04

State officials

- Frank Hornstein, state representative
- Ember Reichgott Junge, former state senator
- Phyllis Kahn, state representative
- Margaret Anderson Kelliher, state representative
- Allan Spear, former state senator, former president of the Minnesota Senate

Local officials

- Amy Klobuchar, county attorney of Hennepin County; 2006 Democratic nominee for U.S. senator from Minnesota
- R.T. Rybak, mayor of Minneapolis

Party officials

- Mike Erlandson, former chair of the Minnesota Democratic-Farmer-Labor Party; former chief of staff to Martin Olav Sabo

Individuals

- Samuel L. Kaplan, businessman and attorney
- Jack Nelson-Pallmeyer, associate professor of Justice and Peace Studies at the University of St. Thomas

Labor unions

- AFL-CIO
- American Federation of State, County and Municipal Employees
- International Brotherhood of Teamsters
- National Education Association
- Service Employees International Union

Organizations

- Clean Water Action
- National Jewish Democratic Council
- Sierra Club

Newspapers and publications

- Esquire
- Minnesota Daily
- Star Tribune
Tammy Lee (IM)

Federal officials

- Tim Penny, former U.S. representative from MN-01

State officials

- Peggy Leppik, former state representative (Republican)
- Jesse Ventura, former governor of Minnesota

Individuals

- Steve Minn, businessman

Newspapers and publications

- Lavender Magazine

=== Results ===
2006 Minnesota's 5th congressional district election
Party	Candidate	Votes	%
Democratic (DFL)	Keith Ellison	136,060	55.56
Republican	Alan Fine	52,263	21.34
Independence	Tammy Lee	51,456	21.01
Green	Jay Pond	4,792	1.94
Independent	Write-ins	334	0.14
Total votes		244,905	100.00

==== By county ====
County	Keith Ellison DFL		Alan Fine Republican		Tammy Lee Independence		Various candidates Other parties		Margin		Total
County	#	%	#	%	#	%	#	%	#	%	Total
Anoka (part)	9,253	45.0%	6,388	31.1%	4,637	22.6%	283	1.4%	2,865	13.9%	20,561
Hennepin (part)	126,273	56.6%	45,509	20.4%	46,614	20.9%	4,819	2.1%	79,659	35.7%	223,215
Ramsey (part)	542	47.8%	367	32.4%	206	18.2%	18	1.6%	175	15.4%	1,133
Totals	136,068	55.6%	52,264	21.3%	51,457	21.0%	5,120	2.1%	83,804	34.3%	244,909

== Reactions ==
Ellison's victory made him the first Muslim member of Congress, as well as the first African-American congressman from Minnesota. His win was positively received by Muslim communities in the United States, who viewed it as an affirmation of their ability to advance politically. Incumbent congressman Sabo congratulated Ellison on his victory, stating, "He has a big task in front of him and I wish him well". He cautioned Ellison against letting his high-profile status become a liability. After his victory, Ellison was denounced by users on the salafist message board Al-Hesbah, who deemed him "the first Jewish Muslim that goes to Congress" and "[a] one-way ticket to hell".

Ellison announced that he would use a Quran when being sworn into his seat, a decision which led to the Quran oath controversy of the 110th United States Congress.
