= Neal Karlen =

American journalist and author

Neal Karlen is an American journalist, memoirist and author of nine books, currently living in Minneapolis. He is a former Contributing Editor for Rolling Stone, former Associate Editor at Newsweek, longtime contributor to The New York Times; and on-air essayist for several CBS News magazine shows. He has published profiles and personal essays in The New Yorker, Esquire, GQ, The Washington Post, New York, and Slate.

== Early life ==
Karlen grew up in Minneapolis, Minnesota, and attended St. Louis Park High School. He graduated magna cum laude from Brown University, where he was elected to Phi Beta Kappa and won the American Historical Society Prize for his senior thesis.

== Career ==
Karlen has been a contributing author to many well-known magazines, including Newsweek, The New York Times, and Rolling Stone. He most recently published "This Thing Called Life" about Prince, which Publishers Weekly named one of the top ten biographies and memoirs of the 2020 season. Rolling Stone reprinted a chapter upon publication, praising Karlen, the musician's "longtime confidant" for telling “the story not just of Prince's life, but of a rare decades long friendship between a writer and an iconic artist"; The Star Tribune, the musician's hometown paper, called Karlen's work "easily the most telling book about the late Prince." Karlen's other books, including several national bestsellers, vary in topic ranging from vaudeville ("Take My Life, Please"); religious assimilation ("Shanda"); minor league baseball ("Slouching Toward Fargo"); the intersection between politics and organized crime ("Augie’s Secrets") and linguistics ("The Story of Yiddish").

In September 2023 he was featured prominently in the Netflix film The Saint of Second Chances directed by Academy Award winning documentarian Morgan Neville ("20 Feet From Stardom") and Jeff Malmberg. Besides appearing in several other documentaries and television programs, Karlen was portrayed as Prince's closest confidant by Cornelius Geaney Jr. in British ITV's 2017 biopic, The Prince Story.

== List of books ==
- Take My Life, Please! - Henny Youngman (1991) ISBN 978-0-688-07744-0
- The Babe in Boyland (1995) ISBN 978-0-06-039188-1
- Babes in Toyland: The Making and Selling of a Rock and Roll Band (1995) ISBN 978-0-8129-2058-1
- Jen-X: Jenny McCarthy's Open Book (1997) ISBN 978-0-06-039233-8
- Slouching Toward Fargo: A Two-Year Saga Of Sinners And St. Paul Saints At The Bottom Of The Bush Leagues With Bill Murray, Darryl Strawberry, Dakota Sadie And Me (1999) ISBN 978-0-06-039233-8
- Shanda: The Making and Breaking of a Self-loathing Jew (2004) Simon and Schuster. ISBN 978-0-7432-6631-4
- The Story of Yiddish: How a Mish-Mosh of Languages Saved the Jews (2009) HarperCollins. ISBN 978-0-06-083711-2
- Augie's Secrets: The Minneapolis Mob and the King of the Hennepin Strip, (2013) Minnesota Historical Society Press. ISBN 978-1-250-13524-7
- This Thing Called Life: Prince's Odyssey On + Off the Record, (2020) MacMillan Publishers/St. Martin's Press. ISBN 978-1-250-13524-7

== Anthologies ==
- Under Purple Skies: The Minneapolis Anthology; Frank Bures, Ed., Belt Publishing, 2019. Reprint of a 1985 Rolling Stone cover story on Minneapolis. ISBN 978-1-948742-43-6
- Rolling Stone’s The 90’s: The Inside Stories, anthology collected by the editors of Rolling Stone, HarperCollins (2010), reprint of 1990 cover story on Prince. ISBN 978-0-06-177920-6
- Fishing With My Father: A Literary Companion, edited by Peter Kaminsky, Penguin Publishers, 2005, two previously published essays from The New York Times. ISBN 978-1-59609-146-7
- The Complete Armchair Book of Baseball: An All-Star Lineup Celebrates America’s National Pastime, Scribner publishers, 2004; edited by John Thorn, introduction by Commissioner A. Bartlett Giamatti; reprint of piece, “The Bad Nose Bees,” originally published in Rolling Stone, in an anthology of baseball writing from the Civil War to the present. ISBN 978-1-57866-004-9
- The Armchair Book of Baseball, Volume II; (Scribner, 1997; John Thorn, ed.) ISBN 978-0-684-18772-3
- The Indiana Review, University of Indiana, 1995, fiction, “The Power of the Just-Dead;” in the national literary magazine;
- The Best American Sportswriting 1994 (Houghton Mifflin, 1994; Glenn Stout, ed.) Cited for Village Voice feature article on Willie Mays. ISBN 978-0-395-63325-0

== Awards ==
Neal was the recipient of the CASEY Award in 1999 for his book Slouching Toward Fargo.
