= Summit on 16th United Methodist Church =

Church building in Ohio, United States

Coordinates: 40°0′5″N 83°0′21″W

Summit on 16th United Methodist Church is a former church in Columbus, Ohio. The building was constructed in 1954, originally for the Wesley Foundation of the Ohio State University. In 1977, the foundation merged with the Indianola United Methodist Church and University United Methodist Church to form the Summit United Methodist Church.

In 1983, mid-century architect Edward Sövik redesigned the building's multi-purpose room to create a worship space for the congregation.

In 2023, the building was listed on Columbus Landmarks' 2023 Most Endangered Sites list, as plans were released to demolish the church and replace it with a seven-story apartment building.
