= Ellingboe =

Ellingboe is a surname. Notable people with the surname include:

- Bradley Ellingboe (born 1958), American composer
- Jules Ellingboe (1892–1948), American racecar driver
