= Amanda Cox =

American journalist and editor

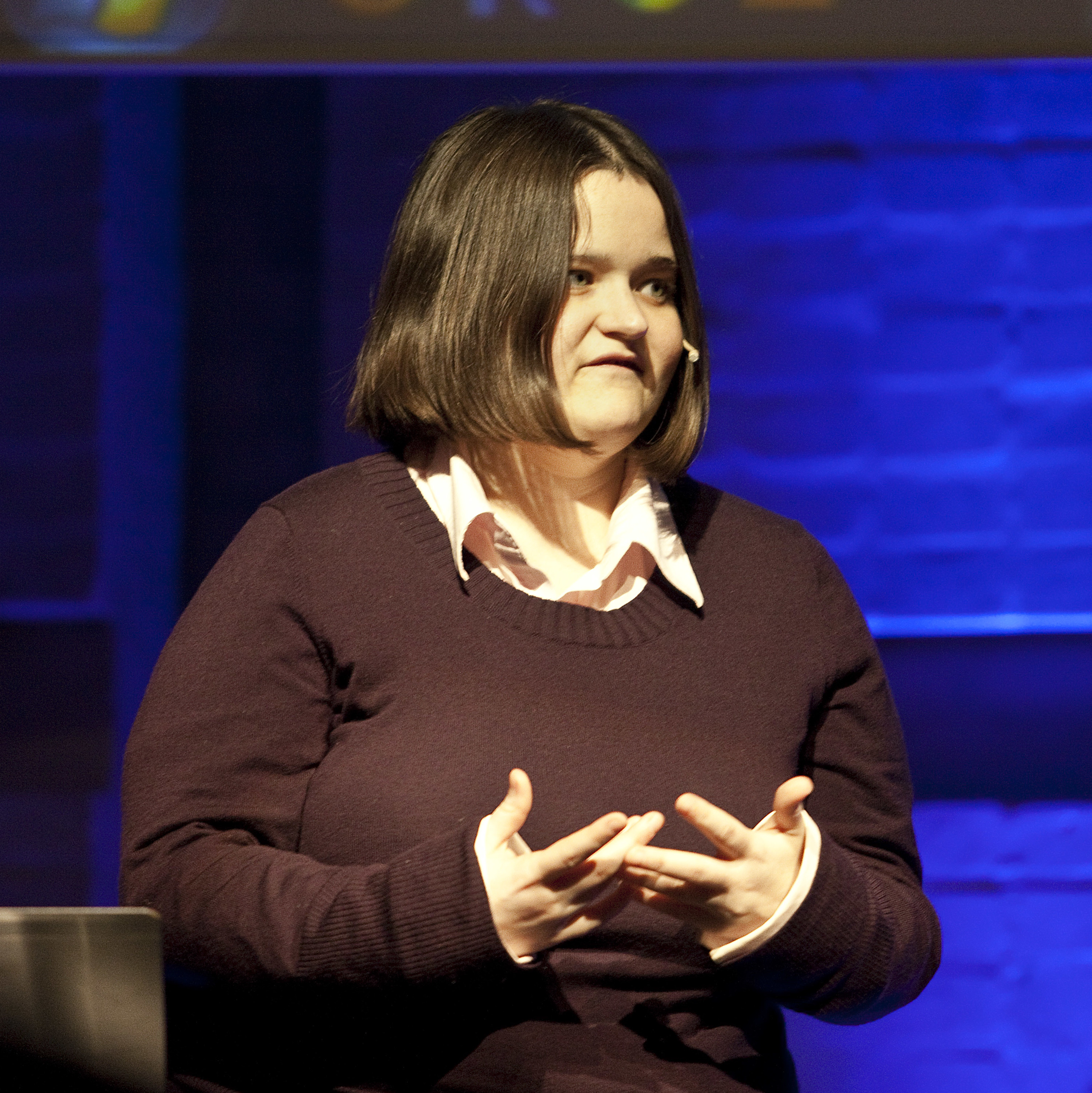
- Born: Amanda Cox; 1980 (age 45–46); Michigan, U.S.
- Citizenship: American
- Education: St. Olaf College, University of Washington
- Awards: National Design Award 2009; Excellence in Statistical Reporting Award 2012; Malofiej award 2011; Gerald Loeb Award 2013 2014 2016 2017
- Scientific career
- Fields: Statistics; Data science; R (programming language); Journalism

Amanda Cox is an American journalist and executive editor of data journalism at Bloomberg News. Previously she was head of special data projects at USAFacts. Until January 2022 she was the editor of the New York Times data journalism section The Upshot. Cox helps develop and teach data journalism courses at the New York University School of Journalism.

== Life and education ==
Cox was born in Michigan in 1980, and raised by her accountant parents. She earned her bachelor's degree in economics from St. Olaf College in 2001. In 2005, she received her master's degree in statistics from the University of Washington. While studying at St. Olaf, she worked for her college newspaper by filling the paper's back page with charts, tables, and commentary.

== Career and research ==
She began her career at the New York Times as a summer intern while in graduate school. Cox worked at the Federal Reserve Board from 2001 to 2003. Cox was hired in 2005 as a graphics editor at The New York Times. In her years at the Times, Cox has worked on many stories using statistics and data visualization, making the Times one of the new graphic leaders according to the Harvard Business Review.

On April 22, 2014, the New York Times website launched its data journalism section, The Upshot, with Amanda Cox a graphics editor. Cox was named editor of The Upshot in early 2016, called "a rare intellect" and "a crucial part of the future leadership of The Times". Her desk created the election monitoring needle for the 2016 US Presidential Election.

In late 2017 Cox implemented a "live polling" feature at the Times, partnering with Siena College, allowing for election results in real-time. Cox is considered one of the Times' "resident experts on polling."

Cox is a leader in the field of data visualization, called "the Michael Phelps of infographics." Her conference talks have included Shaping Data for News at the Eyeo festival and keynoting at OpenVis Conf in 2013 and 2017. In her opening keynote in 2013, Cox said the design "wasn't ultimately about typography and whitespace, but about empathy—about creating visualizations that readers can both understand and engage with emotionally." Since Cox's tenure, the times has "led the field of innovative information graphics" and "raised the bar of journalistic interactive visualization."

She has also served as the judge for data visualization competitions, and several of her data visualizations were selected for The Best American Infographics 2014 and The Best American Infographics 2016.

In January 2022, after 16 years at the Times, Cox joined USAFacts, a non-profit centered in providing a single, unified resource for public data.

In July 2023, Cox joined Bloomberg News as executive editor of data journalism.

== Notable works ==
Influential articles that Cox has contributed to:

- One 9/11 Tally: $3.3 Trillion
- The Ebb and Flow of Movies: Box Office Receipts 1986–2007, a foremost example of a timely adoption of an information visualization technique, the streamgraph for wider audiences.
- The Voting Habits of Americans Like You
- Where the Poor Live Longer: How Your Area Compares
- You Draw It: How Family Income Predicts Children's College Chances
- Money, Race, and Success: How Your School District Compares
- What It Takes to Make 2.8 Million Calls to Voters
- One Report, Diverging Perspectives
- Live Presidential Forecast
- Married couple tax bonuses and penalties
- 3-D chart for economy's future
- Increasing rates of men who don't work
- Birth year and political leanings
- Price of Damien Hirst spot paintings

== Awards ==
Cox received the National Design Award in 2009, along with her graphics team at The New York Times. In 2011, Cox's team was awarded a Malofiej award for their Features Graphics Portfolio. Cox was awarded the Excellence in Statistical Reporting Award by the American Statistical Association in 2012. Her team has won a Gerald Loeb Award four times: in 2013 for Economics Interactives, in 2014 for Interactive Graphics, in 2016 for Making Data Visual, and in 2017 for Business Visuals.

== See also ==
- American Statistical Association
- List of St. Olaf College people
- FiveThirtyEight
