= Jane Smisor Bastien =

American author and educator

- Born: Jane Smisor; January 15, 1936; Hutchinson, Kansas
- Died: 27 March 2018 (aged 82); La Jolla, California
- Occupation: Educator
- Spouse: James Bastien
- Children: Lisa and Lori

Jane Smisor Bastien (15 January 1936 – 27 March 2018) was an American author and educator, best known for publishing works on teaching piano methods and techniques. She published more than 500 books that were translated into sixteen languages.

== Biography ==
Jane Smisor Bastien was born 15 January 1936. Her mother, Gladys Smisor, was a piano teacher. She attended Stephens College in Missouri where she studied for two years with David Milliken. She later moved to New York to attend Barnard College, graduating in 1957. She received a masters from Teachers College, Columbia University. While at Columbia, she met fellow student Neil A. Kjos Jr., who later became president of Neil A. Kjos Music Company. She met James Bastien in New Orleans, Louisiana and they married in 1961.

Bastien taught at H. Sophie Newcomb Memorial College at Tulane University. Bastien, along with her husband James, published the piano pedagogy collections “Bastien Piano Basics” and “Bastien New Traditions”. The Music Teachers National Association awarded her the Lifetime Achievement Award in 1999 and the Citation for Leadership in 2018. She died 27 March 2018.
