= Kenneth T. Neilson =

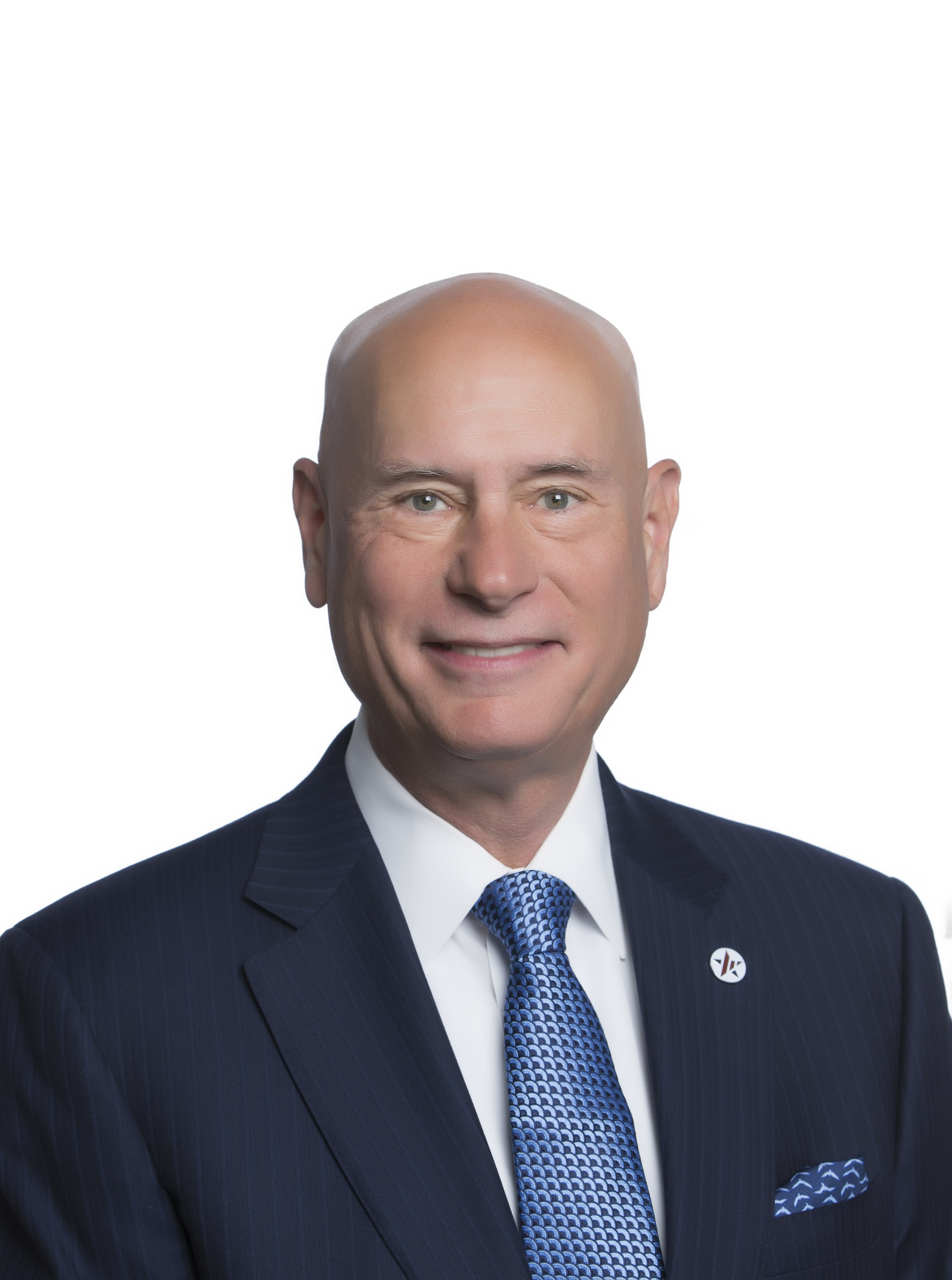
- Born: June 20, 1948 (age 78); Brooklyn, NY, United States
- Education: St. Olaf College (BBA); Rutgers University (M.B.A.)
- Occupation: Retired
- Board member of: Quinnipiac University

Kenneth T. Neilson (June 20, 1948) is an American banker and business executive. He is the former president and chief executive officer of Patriot National Bancorp, Inc. and Patriot Bank, N.A. He has served as director since October 2010.

== Early life ==
Neilson was born in Brooklyn, New York. He graduated from St. Olaf College in Northfield, Minnesota, and the Stonier Graduate School of Banking in Philadelphia, Pennsylvania at Rutgers University.

== Career ==
In 2010, Neilson joined the board of Patriot National Bancorp, Inc. In March 2013, he became president and chief executive officer of the Company and Bank. Under his leadership, Patriot National Bank has reported at least 10 quarters of increased earnings.

Prior to joining Patriot, Neilson served as president and CEO of Hudson United Bancorp, Inc. and Hudson United Bank from 1989–2006, and was named chairman of the board in 1996. He joined the company in 1983 and served as First Senior Vice President/Senior Lending Officer and Assistant to the President. As President, he negotiated 32 banking acquisitions and grew the bank from $550 million in assets to $9 billion assets and ranking among the top 10% most profitable community banks in the United States. During that time, the bank also expanded from 15 branches in New Jersey to 204 bank locations throughout New Jersey, Connecticut, New York and Pennsylvania. In 2006, TD Bank purchased Hudson United Bancorp, Inc. and Neilson retired.

Neilson was previously with The Summit Bancorporation and American National Bank.

Neilson is the past chairman of the New Jersey Bankers Association and the Hudson County Chamber of Commerce.

== Awards and board positions ==
In 2005, the Ramapo College Foundation named him a Distinguished Citizens Honoree.

In 2006, Neilson was inducted into Qunnipiac University's Business Leader Hall of Fame.

He currently serves as a board member of Quinnipiac University in Hamden, Connecticut.
