= David Piwnica-Worms =

American professor of radiology and biochemistry

David Piwnica-Worms is an American radiologist and biochemist. He is the Gerald Dewey Dodd Jr., Endowed Distinguished Chair in Diagnostic Imaging and a professor of Cancer Systems Imaging and Professor of Cancer Biology at The University of Texas MD Anderson Cancer Center. He also serves as the chair of the Department of Cancer Systems Imaging at the same institution.

== Career and research work ==
Piwnica-Worms earned his bachelor's degree from Stanford University and his medical and doctorate degrees from Duke University School of Medicine, where he was a Medical Scientist Training Program awardee. Piwnica-Worms completed his residency in diagnostic radiology and a fellowship at Brigham and Women’s Hospital, followed by faculty appointments at Harvard Medical School. He spent two decades at Washington University School of Medicine in St. Louis, where he directed the Molecular Imaging Center and the BRIGHT Institute before joining MD Anderson Cancer Center in 2013.

In the field of molecular imaging Piwnica-Worms has developed methods to visualize and measure biological processes in living organisms at the molecular and cellular levels. His work primarily involves genetically encoded bioluminescent and radiotracer reporter systems to study signal transduction, protein interactions, and gene expression in various biological contexts, including single cells, cell populations, and live animals.

His past research interests also included the function and regulation of the multidrug resistance P-glycoprotein family of transporters. He currently leads translational research efforts using cell-penetrating peptides for fluorescence imaging applications in the eye. and radiopharmaceuticals for medical imaging applicationsof inflammation with. positron emission tomography (PET). His lab has also discovered and is advancing novel ligands and antibodies into the clinic for imaging and beta-radioligand therapy applications (theranostics) targeting B7H3, a receptor expressed on many tumors.

He is a scientific founder of Radiopharm Ventures.

== Honors ==
- Elected member of the National Academy of Medicine in 2014
- Elected fellow of the American Association for the Advancement of Science in 2014
- Elected fellow of the World Molecular Imaging Society in 2012

== Personal life ==
Born in 1956, Piwnica-Worms is married to cell-cycle researcher Helen Piwnica-Worms. They have a daughter and a son.
