= Cheryl Willman =

American cancer researcher (born 1954)

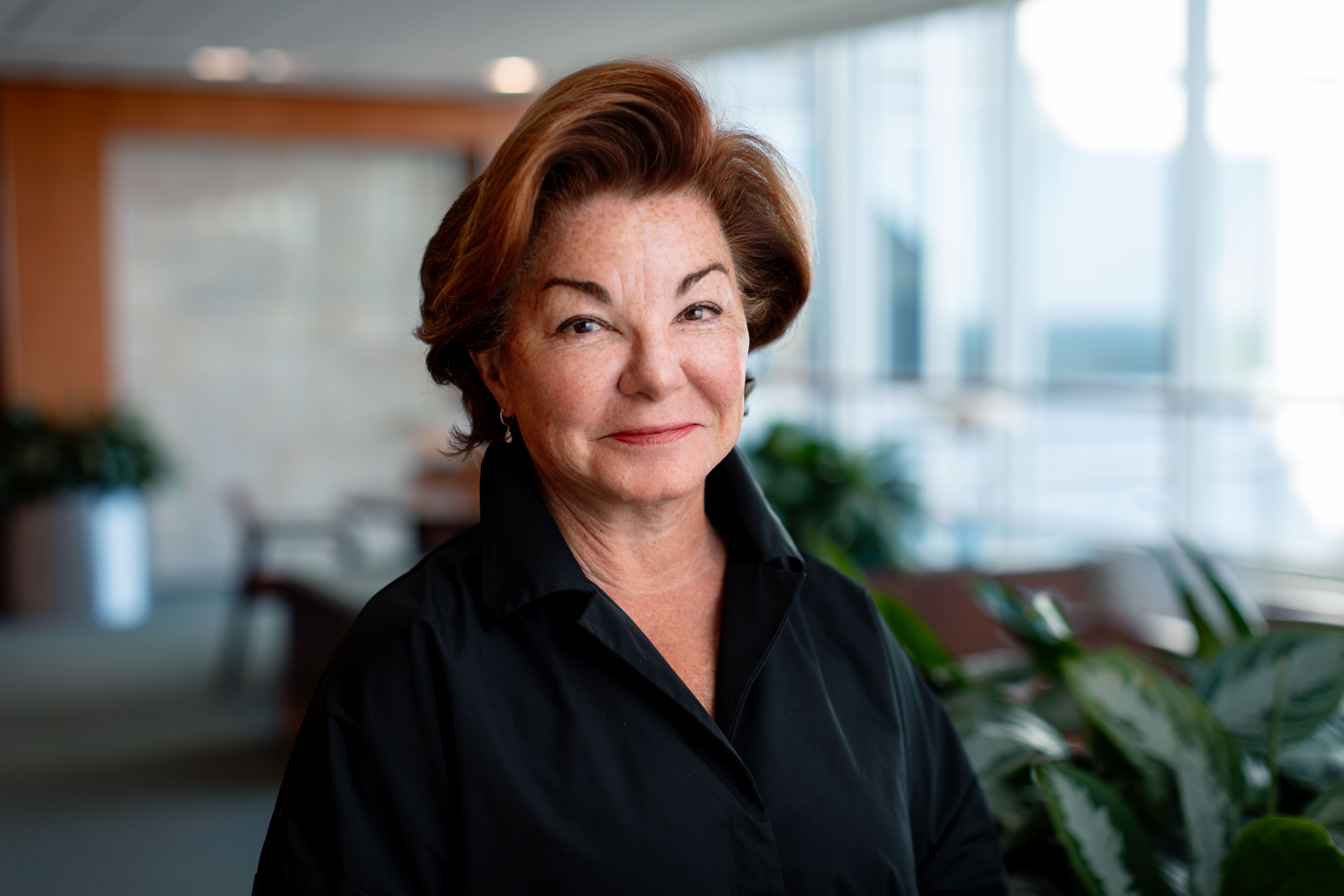
- Born: November 5, 1954 (age 71); Hartford City, Indiana
- Spouse: Ross Zumwalt (m. 1988)

Academic background
- Education: BSc, 1977, St. Olaf College; MD, 1981, Mayo Clinic Alix School of Medicine

Cheryl Lynn Willman (born November 5, 1954) is an American cancer researcher and executive director of Mayo Clinic Cancer Programs at the Mayo Clinic Comprehensive Cancer Center.

== Early life and education ==
Willman was born on November 5, 1954, in Hartford City, Indiana, but she grew up in Iowa. She was born into a practicing Lutheran family as her grandfather played the church organ while her father worked as a nonordained ministry associate and administrator for the Evangelical Lutheran Church in America. Growing up, Willman attended Bettendorf High School where she served as class vice president and newspaper journalist. Upon graduating from high school, Willman enrolled at St. Olaf College where she majored in chemistry and graduated in 1977. She originally intended to enroll in law school but had become disillusioned with the American legal system due to the Vietnam War.

Following her undergraduate degree, Willman completed her medical degree in 1981 at the Mayo Clinic Alix School of Medicine and her internship, residency, and fellowship at the University of New Mexico School of Medicine (UNM School of Medicine). During her third year at the Mayo Clinic, she stepped away from the school for six months to join the National Institutes of Health’s medical science training program. During her time with the program, she was mentored by immunologists Anthony Fauci and Alfred D. Steinberg.

== Career ==
Upon completing her medical degree and fellowships, Willman joined the faculty at the University of New Mexico School of Medicine in 1982. During her early tenure at the UNM School of Medicine, Willman focused her research on developing cancer diagnostics and therapies by using genomic, next generation sequencing and computational technologies to identify cancer-causing DNA mutations. As such, she was awarded one of the first NIH Physician-Scientist Awards for her research. Following this, Willman began focusing on leukemia as an area of expertise, and she developed UNM’s first molecular diagnostics lab. In 1993, Willman found that the loss of only half of the normal pair of IRF-1 genes could lead to someone developing leukemia. She came to this conclusion by studying the IRF-1 gene of 13 patients who had adult leukemia or myelodysplasia. In 1999, Willman was appointed director of the UNM Comprehensive Cancer Center which she helped expand from a team of 12 physicians to 143. As a result of her work at the cancer center, the National Cancer Institute designated the center as one of the nation's 60 premier programs in 2005.

As she continued her tenure at UNM School of Medicine, Willman was named the Maurice & Marguerite Liberman Distinguished Chair in Cancer Research and became a Full Professor of Pathology and Medicine. In these roles, she began to research and study Acute lymphoblastic leukemia in Hispanic and Native American children who were not responding to standard therapies. Her research team discovered that these children had Philadelphia-like ALL caused by a genetic mutation specific to them. In 2013, she was honored with the "La Estrella" award from the YWCA for her "distinguished medical career and her leadership role in the field of cancer research." Two years later, she chosen to receive a 2015 STC.UNM Innovation Fellow Award in recognition of her achievements as "one of the University of New Mexico’s leading innovators." In the same year, Willman also accepted the Regents' Meritorious Service Medal in recognition of extraordinary and distinguished service.

In 2017, Willman was elected a Fellow of the National Academy of Inventors for having a "tremendous impact on fostering a culture of innovation at the UNM Comprehensive Cancer Center and The University of New Mexico that is felt on local, national, and international levels." During the COVID-19 pandemic, Willman encouraged social distancing and wearing a face mask. In 2021, she was named executive director of Mayo Clinic Cancer Programs and director of the Mayo Clinic Comprehensive Cancer Center.

== Personal life ==
Willman married pathologist Ross Zumwalt in 1988 and they have one son together.
