= Monthian Buntan =

Thai blind social worker and politician (1965–2024)

- มณเฑียร บุญตัน
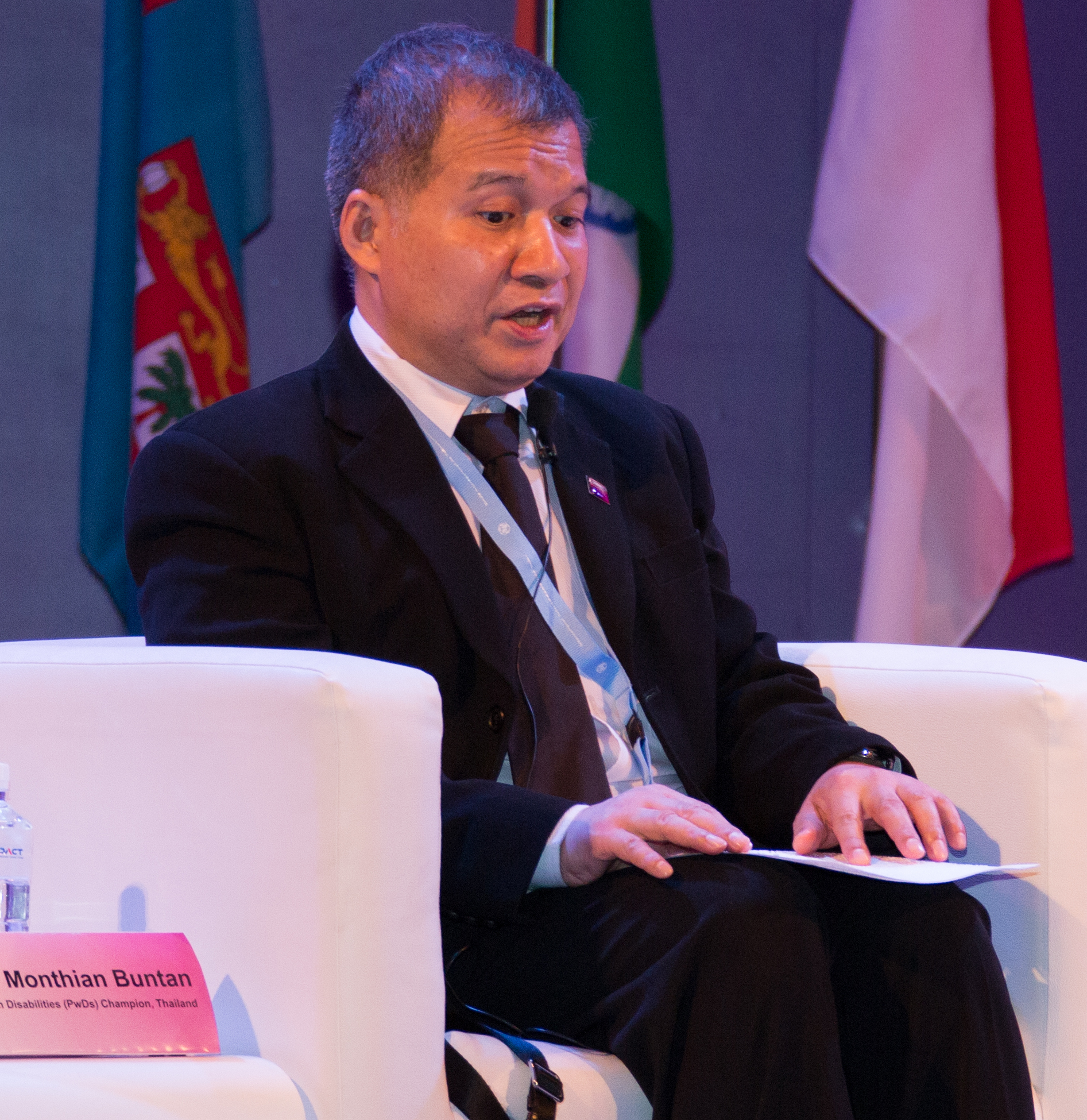
- Buntan in 2013

Member of the Senate of Thailand
- In office 11 May 2019 – 2 March 2024
- In office 2 January 2008 – 24 May 2014

Member of the National Legislative Assembly of Thailand
- In office 31 July 2014 – 21 May 2019

Personal details
- Born: 2 May 1965 Sung Men district, Thailand
- Died: 2 March 2024 (aged 58)
- Education: Chiang Mai University; St. Olaf College (BM); University of Minnesota (MA)
- Occupation: Teacher

Monthian Buntan (Thai: มณเฑียร บุญตัน; 2 May 1965 – 2 March 2024) was a Thai blind social welfare administrator and politician. He was President of the Thailand Association of the Blind, and served in the Senate from 2008 to 2014 and again from 2019 to 2024. He was also a member of the National Legislative Assembly from 2014 to 2019.

Monthian died on 2 March 2024, at the age of 58.
