= Dave Hauck =

American swimmer (1931–2019)

- Hauck in later life as St. Olaf Coach

Biographical details
- Born: July 26, 1931; Madison, Minnesota, U.S.
- Died: July 13, 2019 (aged 87); Northfield, Minnesota, U.S.
- Education: Gustavus Adolphus College '53

Playing career
- 1949–1953: Gustavus Adolphus College
- Position: Sprint freestyle

Coaching career (HC unless noted)
- 1955–1958: Henderson, Minnesota; High School Coach
- 1958–1965: Madison Prep Football Coach
- 1966–1973: St. Olaf College; Gymnastics Coach
- 1973–2013: St. Olaf College; Men's Swimming Coach (Also Football, Softball, Golf)
- 1989–2013: St. Olaf College; Women's Swimming Coach

Accomplishments and honors

Championships
- 43 Minnesota Conf (MIAC) championships (St. Olaf- 28 men, 15 women)

Awards
- 3 x CSCAA Division III Coach of the Year; 8 x Minnesota Conf. (MIAC) Coach of the Year; 1992 Minnesota Swimming Hall of Fame; 2000 CSCAA Richard Steadman Award; 2006 St. Olaf Athletic Hall of Fame

David "Haucker" Hauck (July 26, 1931 – July 13, 2019) was an American competitive swimmer for Gustavus Adolphus College and a swimming coach for St. Olaf College serving as Head Coach for 40 years from 1973–2013, where he led the team to 43 Minnesota Conference (MIAC) championships which included 28 for the men's team, and 15 for the women's teams. While at St. Olaf, he also served 30 years as an Assistant Football Coach, nine years as the Gymnastic's Coach for Men, seven years as the Men's Golf Coach, and six years as a softball coach.

== Education and swimming ==
Born on July 26, 1931 in Madison, Minnesota to Mary and Leslie Hauck, he attended Madison High School, graduating in 1949.

Hauck attended and swam for Gustavus Adolphus College, in St. Peter Minnesota, about 150 miles Southeast of Madison, where he was coached by Vic Gustafson, and became a Minnesota Interscholastic Athletic Conference (MIAC) individual champion six times. He met his future wife Mary Lundgren while attending St. Olaf. On March 3, 1951, he won the 100-yard freestyle at the MIAC championship with a time of 56.6, also winning the 60-yard event. In 1952 he helped lead Gustavus Adolphus to the MIAC Team Conference Championship, earning two more individual titles that included a win in the 50-yard freestyle where he set a new state record of 24.7 seconds, as well as a win in the 100-yard freestyle.

In the 1953 MIAC Championships, he set another 50-yard freestyle record, and was on a winning 400-yard relay team that set a record time of 3:54.8. With Hauck scoring consistently in the conference championships, Gustavus Adolphus were the runners-up for the Minnesota (MIAC) state conference championship in both 1951 and 1953, demonstrating the team's high standing in the conference during Hauck's tenure as a swimmer.

Graduating Gustavus in 1953, he obtained a Master’s degree in physical education at Minnesota's Bemidji State University, and served in the Army Medical Corps from 1953–1955. He married his wife Mary while still in the service on July 10, 1954, in her hometown of Warren, Minnesota.

== Coaching ==
Beginning his coaching career after completing his military service, Hauck coached and taught in Henderson, Minnesota from around 1955–1958. From 1958–1966, he coached and taught in his hometown of Madison, Minnesota, where in May 1966 while coaching football at Madison Prep, he was a nominee for the Coach of the Year by the Minnesota Football Coaches Association.

=== St. Olaf ===
From 1966 through 1973, Hauck coached Gymnastics at St. Olaf. He then served as the men's head swimming coach from 1973–2013, where he led the swim team to 43 Minnesota Conference (MIAC) championships which included 28 for the men's team, and 15 for the women's teams. Hauck may have assisted with the swimming program a few years after stepping down as head coach in 2013, through around 2016, as his total time with the St. Olaf Men's swim team was 44 years, or he may have had a few years prior to 1973 as an Assistant Coach. He coached St. Olaf's women's swimming team as Head Coach from around 1989–2013. Invaluable to the team during his tenure, Hauck also coached diving for a period.

Though swimming in a less than optimal facility built in 1967, Hauck's Men's swim teams at St. Olaf won their first Conference title in 1977 only four years after he began as head swimming coach in 1973, and then repeated as MIAC champions from 1980–1999, dominating their conference for twenty years. As noted previously, Hauck coached the men's swim team for a total 44 seasons beginning in 1973, and the women's team for a total 27 seasons, beginning in 1989. His St. Olaf Men's and Women's swimming teams together had 21 national finishes in the top-10 with 16 for men, and five for women. During Hauck's coaching tenure, St. Olaf had 21 Division III NCAA individual national titles and one NCAA relay national championship.

While at St. Olaf, he also served 30 years as an Assistant Football Coach beginning in the late 60's, seven years as the Gymnastic's Coach for Men from 1966–1973, seven years as the Men's Golf Coach, and six years as the softball coach. Earning a Masters from Bemidji State University in Physical Education, Hauck also taught in St. Olaf's Exercise Department for thirty years.

=== Outstanding swimmers ===
Hauck's most outstanding St. Olaf team members included Gabe Kortuem who won a 1 meter diving title in 2002, future American Airlines Executive, Tim Niznik who won a 100 fly title in 1990, and a 200 IM title in 1990, and Nelson Westby whose four titles included three in the 200 IM between 2007–09 and one in the 200 breaststroke in 2009. Kortuem later served as St. Olaf's diving coach for at least 20 years, beginning around the 2002 season. He also coached Kevin Casson to an impressive five titles that included two in the 500 free in 1986 and 1989 and three in the 1650 free in 1987–89.

Among his most decorated swimmers was his son Bob Hauck, who was a 1987 national Division III Swimmer of the Year. Bob co-coached St. Olaf with his father Dave from 1988, and continued through at least the 2020 season.

Though he coached into his 80's, Hauck enjoyed activities outside his profession. He was a long serving member of First United Methodist in Northfield, where he was a Choir member, and played on the softball team. He enjoyed yard work and the outdoors, and for many years spent time hiking and camping in Montana where he had a daughter.

Hauck died near the St. Olaf Campus in Northfield, Minnesota on July 19, 2019 at the age of 87. He was survived by his wife Mary of 65 years, three children and grandchildren. A July 27 memorial service was held at St. Olaf, and his funeral was held the following day at a Memorial Chapel on the St. Olaf Campus.

=== Honors ===
Honored primarily for his long tenure as a St. Olaf's coach, Hauck was a three-time College Swimming Coaches Association of America (CSCAA) Division III Coach of the Year, earning the award with the men's team in 1987 and 2009, and with the women's team in the 1989 season. On the conference level, he was an eight-time Minnesota Interscholastic Athletic Conference (MIAC) Coach of the Year when combining the performance of both the Men & Women's teams. In 1992, he was inducted into the Minnesota Swimming Hall of Fame, and in 2000 received the more exclusive CSCAA Richard E. Steadman Award for making his swimming program at St. Olaf an enjoyable and fun environment for his swimmers.

Hauck was inducted in 1987 to the Gustavus Adolphus Hall of Fame for his efforts as a swimmer. For his tenure and contributions at the university, he was inducted to the St. Olaf College Athletics Hall of Fame in 2006. In his honor, St. Olaf annually presents the Dave Hauck Trophy to two senior athletes, one male and one female, in their final eligible year to recognize service, achievement, and excellence. St. Olaf also presents the Dave Hauck Award Fund Endowment to recognize athletes that best represent the college's ideals. Hauck was also recognized in the CSCAA 100 Greatest Swimming Coaches of the Century.
