= Steve Minn =

Steve Minn is the former Minority Leader of the Minneapolis City Council, former appointed state official, and is vice president and chief financial manager of Lupe Development, a real estate development company in the Minnesota Twin Cities area.

== Education ==
Steve Minn earned a bachelor's degree in management from Syracuse University and holds an MBA in urban development and finance from the Kellogg Graduate School of Management at Northwestern University.

== Career ==
=== Lupe Development ===
Since 1989, Minn has worked for Lupe Development. As vice president and chief financial manager, he oversees the planning, acquisition, budgeting, finance and construction management responsibilities. Since 2002 he has managed the development and construction of more than 1,000 units of housing and more than 2 million square feet of mixed use, commercial, and industrial property.

During his career, he has also developed a number of homeless veterans housing complexes. In 2018, Lupe Development announced it would build 111 affordable housing units in Minneapolis, using a $1.2 million grant and $2.375 million loan from the city. The development will include housing for homeless veterans. The project, Lake Street Dwelling, opened in November 2020.

Minn's work at Lupe Development also includes commercial properties, such as 1801 County Road B W. in Roseville. Lupe Development acquired the building in October 2021 and plans to convert the property into multitenant offices.

In 2021, Minn was named to Finance & Commerce's POWER 30 list, a feature recognizing people whose achievements have made notable contributions to Minnesota's real estate development field.

=== Elected and appointed government positions ===
Steve Minn was elected to and served on the Minneapolis City Council from 1994 to 1999, representing Ward 13, while rising the ranks to become Minority Leader.

He is not affiliated with a political party; rather, he ran as an independent. In 1997, he won the election with 59.28 percent of the vote. In 1993, he won with 53.09 percent.

In 1999, he resigned his position to join the Governor Jesse Ventura's administration, first as State Commissioner of Public Service in 1999, and then as State Commissioner of Commerce from 2000 to 2001.

He was also appointed by the Minneapolis mayor as the Minneapolis Public Housing Authority Commissioner.

=== Ethics investigation ===
In 2013, the Minneapolis city attorney's office reviewed allegations against Steve Minn after another developer, Kelly Doran, said Minn's use of fake identities to e-mail city officials and make online postings was inappropriate given his appointed role on the city's public housing authority. After reviewing the two instances that fell within the ethical practices board's one-year jurisdiction, ethics officer Susan Trammell determined Minn was acting in his private capacity and did not violate any ethics rules. Trammell wrote she could not find any section of the ethics code violated by the messages.

== Policy issues ==
=== $15 per hour minimum wage ===
In June 2017, the Minneapolis City Council quickly passed a $15 minimum wage. The council's vote took place one week after the release of a study showing the high cost of Seattle's minimum wage.

When Minneapolis first began to consider raising the local minimum wage to $15 per hour, Minn came out publicly in opposition. He believed that such a wage would hurt future affordable housing developments in the city. Affordable housing rents are on a fixed schedule that is determined by the U.S. Department of Housing and Urban Development (HUD). Landlords cannot raise the rents to cover increased costs, and they are not allowed to pass on higher utility costs to their tenants. Minn believes that the $15 per hour minimum wage would dissuade developers from developing affordable housing units in the future for these reasons.

=== Affordable housing ===
In Minnesota, cities are able to enter into contracts with existing residential building owners that keep rents and income restrictions below 60 percent of the area median income. In effect, this decreases the properties' taxable rate by 40 percent. The tax loss is much lower than the cost of replacing a "lost affordable unit." Minn advocated for landlords utilizing these policies to keep rents from rising.

Minn also advocated for the government to pay landlords competitive rents under the Housing Choice Voucher (Section 8) program. He believes that these policies, when used, would allow landlords of older buildings to keep those buildings, make some improvements, and hold rent at a steady amount.

=== Public works ===
While serving on the Minneapolis City Council, Minn introduced legislation that would implement 24-hour snow plowing in the city. His underlying reason was to create a strategy to minimize the creation of potholes on the city's streets.

== Boards and commissions ==
Minn has been appointed to several civic boards, including:

- State Environmental Quality Board
- University of Minnesota Commission on Excellence
- Minneapolis Community Development Agency Ad Hoc Advisory Committee on Housing
- Mississippi River Critical Area Rulemaking Project
- AEON Board of Advisors
- Summit Academy Construction Advisory Board

He also served on the board of directors of Bridgewater Bank, a financial institution based out of Bloomington, Minnesota.
