= Lavender (magazine) =

American magazine

- March 2008 cover
- Categories: Free Gay periodical
- Frequency: Biweekly
- Circulation: 33,100 = 17,500 (print), 15,600 (Newsstand installs)
- Founded: 1995
- First issue: June 9, 1995
- Company: Lavender Media, Inc.
- Country: United States
- Based in: Minneapolis, Minnesota
- Language: English
- Website: http://www.lavendermagazine.com

Lavender is an American biweekly print and online magazine, part of Lavender Media, Inc., published in Minneapolis, Minnesota, for the LGBTQ+ community. It is distributed free of charge in the Twin Cities of Minneapolis and St. Paul and in some other cities throughout Minnesota and western Wisconsin.

== History ==
Founded in 1995 by George Holdgrafer and Stephen Rocheford, Lavender's mission is "to appeal to the greatest number of Minnesota LGBTQ+ readers, and direct them to [their] advertisers." Lavender published its 500th issue in June 2014.

In 2017, Stephen Rocheford, CEO of Lavender, publicly voiced criticism of the exclusion of police officers from the 2017 Twin Cities Pride festival parade.

== Controversies ==
In 2016, after the Pulse nightclub shooting in Orlando, Florida, Lavender editors wrote an article accused of anti-Muslim bias. The opposition to the articles organized a Change.org petition aimed at Stephen Rocheford for singling out Islam as a source of violence.

== Awards ==
In 2016, Lavender was named Magazine of the Year by the Minnesota Magazine & Publishing Association (MMPA). It has also received more than 100 MMPA awards in the categories of overall excellence, best digital media, best internet site, best director, best single cover, best feature article, best regular column, best single topic, best how-to article, best use of visuals, best redesign, best media kit, and best editor's or publisher's editorial.
