= Patriot National Bancorp =

American bank holding company

Patriot Bank, N.A.
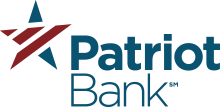
- Company type: Public
- Traded as: Nasdaq: PNBK
- Industry: Financial services
- Founded: 1999; 27 years ago
- Headquarters: Stamford, Connecticut, U.S.
- Key people: Michael Carrazza (chairman); Robert G. Russell, Jr. (president & CEO)
- Operating income: ▲US $25.408 million (2016)
- Total assets: ▲US $756.654 million (2016)
- Total equity: ▲US $62.570 million (2016)
- Number of employees: 115 (2017)
- Website: bankpatriot.com

Patriot Bank, N.A. (PNBK) is the bank holding company for Stamford, Connecticut-based Patriot Bank NA, and is traded on NASDAQ as PNBK.

The bank provides retail and commercial banking services and operates seven locations in Fairfield County, Connecticut, one in New Haven County, Connecticut, and one in Westchester County, New York.

== History ==
On August 31, 1994, Patriot National Bank obtained its charter and opened for business as a community bank. In 1999, Patriot National Bancorp, Incorporated was organized as a Bank Holding Company headquartered in Stamford, Connecticut. The Patriot National Statutory Trust I was founded on March 11, 2003, to issue trust preferred securities and invest the proceeds in subordinated debentures issued by the company.

In 2006, Patriot National Bank purchased a branch office and opened two new branch offices in New York, expanding its geographical footprint into New York State. In August 2017, Patriot announced the signing of a definitive merger agreement pursuant to acquire Prime Bank of Orange, CT, expanding its community banking presence in Connecticut.

In September 2015, the bank announced the bank announced its new name “Patriot Bank”. In July 2017, Patriot announced the resumption of quarterly dividends for shareholders in July 2017, for the first time since 2008.
