= Bradley Ellingboe =

American composer

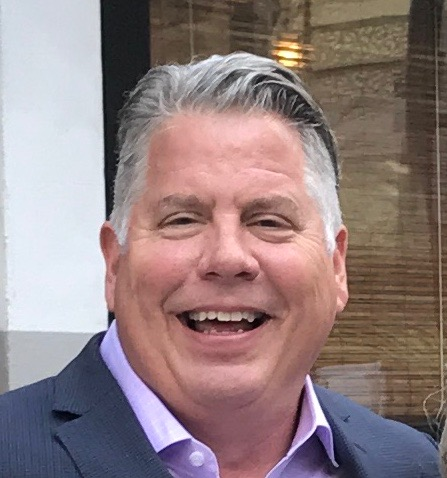
- Born: Bradley Ellingboe; 16 April 1958 (age 68); Lakeville, Minnesota, US
- Education: Saint Olaf College; Eastman School of Music
- Occupations: Composer, conductor
- Awards: Medal of Saint Olav (1994)
- Website: www.bradleyellingboe.com

Bradley Ellingboe (born April 16, 1958) is an American composer, conductor, and bass-baritone singer.

== Biography ==
Born in Lakeville, Minnesota, Ellingboe is a 1980 graduate of Saint Olaf College in Northfield, Minnesota, where he received a degree in Music Theory and Composition, studying with Kenneth and Carolyn Jennings. He then attended the Eastman School of Music in Rochester, New York, graduating with degrees in Vocal Performance and Choral Conducting, where he studied with Jan DeGaetani and was a classmate of Renee Fleming and Gene Scheer. He has done additional study at the University of Oslo, the Aspen Music Festival, and the Vatican.

From 1985 to 2015 he was on the faculty of the University of New Mexico, where he was Professor of Music and Director of Choral Activities. He also, at various times, served as Coordinator of Vocal Studies and Chair of the Department of Music, and held the honorary title of Regents Lecturer.

Ellingboe is well known as a composer and arranger of choral music, with over 160 pieces in print. His "Requiem" for chorus and orchestra has been heard in Carnegie Hall, Lincoln Center and in Prague, Bratislava, and Budapest. "Star Song" for chorus, tenor solo and orchestra was premiered in Lincoln Center and Great Britain in 2014. He has won annual awards in composition from ASCAP (American Society of Composers, Authors and Publishers) since 2000. In 2019, he published A Practical Guide to Choral Conducting with the Neil A. Kjos Music Company. Ellingboe is editor of Choral Literature for Sundays and Seasons (Augsburg Fortress Press, 2004), a compendium of sacred choral music. He is also well known as an expert on the vocal music of Scandinavia, and particularly the songs of Norwegian composer Edvard Grieg (1843–1907). His editions of Grieg's songs, 45 Songs of Edvard Grieg (1988) and A Grieg Song Anthology (1990) are both published by Leyerle Publications. For his work on making the music of Norway better known among English-speaking singers, Ellingboe was awarded the Medal of St. Olav by King Harald V in 1994.

He has curated the choral series Music for the Church Year Neil A. Kjos Music Company since 1996. In 2017 he became Senior Editor for National Music Publishers. He was Composer-In-Residence for the Albany Pro Musica from 2020 to 2023. In 2021 his composition Welcome to Our Wondering Sight won the Weiger Lepke-Sims Family Sacred Music Award for music for harp and choir.

== Sacred vocal works ==
=== Larger works ===
- StarSong for SATB chorus (divisi) and orchestra, or chamber orchestra
1. Overture ("We are made of star stuff.")
2. Music
3. Ring Out, Ye Crystal Spheres
4. Symphony of the Heavens
5. O pastor animarum
6. Take Me By the Hand ("Prend-moi par le main")
7. Looking at the Stars
8. Everyone Sang
9. The Song of the Stars
10. Kadosh Adonai
11. Questions About Angels
12. The Mystic Trumpeter
- Requiem for SATB choir and orchestra, or chamber orchestra
1. Introit ("Requiem aeternam")
2. Kyrie
3. Graduale
4. Psalm (Why Have You Forsaken Me?)
5. The Lord's Prayer
6. Offertory ("Death Be Not Proud")—alto solo
7. Sanctus and Benedictus
8. Agnus Dei
9. Communion (Evensong)
10. Elegy ("Lux aeterna")
- Revelations for SATB choir, organ, bass, timpani
1. Psalm 27
2. The Light
3. This is the Day!
- Welcome to Our Wondering Sight! for SATB choir, soprano solo, oboe, harp
1. Welcome to Our Wondering Sight
2. In This Our Happy Christmastide, Interlude, Reprise
3. I Heard the Bells on Christmas Day, Postlude

=== SATB & SATB Divisi ===
- "Above the Moon, Earth Rises"
- "All loveliness New-born"
- "Astonished By Your Empty Tomb"
- "Beneath the Cross of Jesus"—with clarinet and piano
- "Benediction"
- "Blessed Be the Lord"—with oboe
- "(The) Child of Mary"—with soprano solo and harp
- "Children of the Heavenly Father"
- "(The) Church on the Hill"—with C instrument and piano
- "Christmas"—with organ
- "Clap Your Hands"
- "Come All You People"—with piano, conga, optional string bass
- "Come and See"—with oboe
- "Day by Day"
- "Do Not Fear"
- "Down to the River to Pray"
- "(The) Food of Life"—with piano and optional Bell-tree
- "For the Beauty of Earth"
- "Glory, Glory, Hallelujah"
- "Go Out in Joy"—with organ
- "Holy Wings"
- "(The) House of the Lord"—with organ, piano, handbells, conga
- "How Can I Keep From Singing?"—with oboe and piano
- "How Far Is the Star?"
- "Hymns of Glory"—with organ
- "Jeg er saa glad (I Am So Glad)"—with clarinet
- "I Love to Tell the Story"—with mezzo-soprano solo and violin
- "In the Beauty of Holiness"—with flute and piano
- "Jesus, Good Shepherd"
- "Jesus, Jesus, Rest Your Head"
- "Joy All Around!"
- "Learn from All the Songs of Earth"
- "Let the Heavens Ring!"
- "Let Us Go to Bethlehem"—with flute and organ
- "Let Us Run to Jesus"—with organ and brass quartet
- "Let Us Talents and Tongues Employ"—with organ
- "Lift Up Your Heads"—with optional children's choir
- "Light Dawns on a Weary World"—with optional congregation (not yet in print)
- "Light Upon a Darkened World"
- "(The) Lord's My Shepherd"
- "Love Never Ends"—with children's choir and piano
- "Mary at the Tomb"
- "My Heart is Longing"—with harp and oboe
- "Now at the Peak of Wonder"
- "Now The Green Blade Rises"
- "O Gracious Light"—with flute
- "Our Wistful Song"
- "(The) Plans I Have For You"—with organ and trumpet (not yet in print)
- "Prepare the Royal Highway"
- "Psalm 47"—with percussion
- "Psalm 100"—with organ, handbells, 2 trumpets
- "Psalm 150"—with handbells
- "Simeon's Song"
- "Sing for Joy!"
- "(A) Song for St. Cecilia"—with organ
- "Spirit of God, Descend Upon My Heart"—with clarinet and handbells
- "Tandi Tanga Jesus"—with percussion
- "Then We Shall Sing for Joy!"—with organ, violin, optional children's choir, optional congregation
- "There's a Wideness in God's Mercy"
- "They Little Ones, Dear Lord, Are We"—with optional orchestra
- "We Are More Than Conquerors"
- "We Look to Thee"
- "We Need Each Other's Voice to Sing"—with organ, flute, optional congregation
- "Within Thy Grace"
- "(The) Wondrous Gift"
- "Wondrous Love"
- "Yet it Stood Strong"e

=== SAB chorus ===
- "Behold a Host"
- "Come to Me"
- "Hosanna to the Lord!"
- "Seed That in Earth is Dying"
- "The Prayer of St. Francis"

=== Children's chorus ===
- "Hymn of Promise"—with piano and optional flute
- "We Light One Advent Candle"

=== Men's chorus ===
- "How Can I Keep From Singing?"
- "Peace at the Last"

=== Two-part mixed ===
- "(The) Chief Cornerstone"—with organ or piano, optional trumpet
- "(The) Holy Trinity"
- "Oh, Love, How Deep"—with organ and percussion
- "There is A Green Hill Far Away"
- "When Shall I See?"

=== Women's chorus ===
- "A la ru, a la me"—with two flutes
- "Ave Regina Caelorum (Hail, Queen of Heaven)"
- "How Can I Keep From Singing?"—with piano and oboe
- "(The) Lord's Prayer"
- "Magnificat"—with soprano solo, oboe, marimba
- "Ring Out, Wild Bells!"—with handbells

== Secular vocal works ==
=== Larger works ===
- Star Song for SATB choir, tenor solo, and piano, chamber orchestra, or full orchestra
1. Overture ("We are all made of star stuff"—Sagan)
2. Music (Liiv)
3. Ring Out, Ye Crystal Spheres (Milton)
4. Symphony of the Heavens (Milton)
5. O Pastor Animarum (Hildegard von Bingen)
6. Prends moi par la main (Rilke)
7. Looking at the Stars (Van Gogh)
8. Everyone Sang (Sassoon)
9. The Song of the Stars (Native American)
10. Kadosh Adonai (trad. Hebrew)
11. Questions About Angels (Collins)
12. The Mystic Trumpeter (Whitman)

=== SATB & SATB Divisi ===
- "(The) Ash Grove"—with two clarinets
- "Be Music, Night"
- "Dappled Things"—with soprano solo
- "For Only a Short Time"
1. Unheard Music (Gavotte)
2. Laughter and Noise (Waltz)
3. The Secret (Minuet)
4. Attack Dog (Tango)
5. Perfect Strangers (Sarabande)
- "Heart, We Will Forget Him"—with cello
- "He Wishes for the Cloths of Heaven"
- "Paal paal haugen (Paul and his Chickens)"
- "The Reason for My Song"
- "This is a Good World"
- "To Walk Like Giants"

=== Children's chorus ===
- "Paal paal haugen (Paul and his Chickens)"

=== Men's chorus ===
- "Innisfree"
- "How Can I Keep From Singing?"

=== Women's chorus ===
- "Getting Used to Heavens"
- "That Passeth All Understanding"—with soprano solo, Bb clarinet, optional windchimes
- "Wind of the Western Sea"

== Books ==
- 45 Songs of Edvard Grieg (c) 1988, Leyerle Publications
- A Grieg Song Anthology (c) 1990, Leyerle Publications
- Choral Literature for Sundays and Seasons (c) 2004, Augsburg Fortress Press
- A Practical Guide to Choral Conducting (c) 2019, Neil A. Kjos Music Company
