= David Ede =

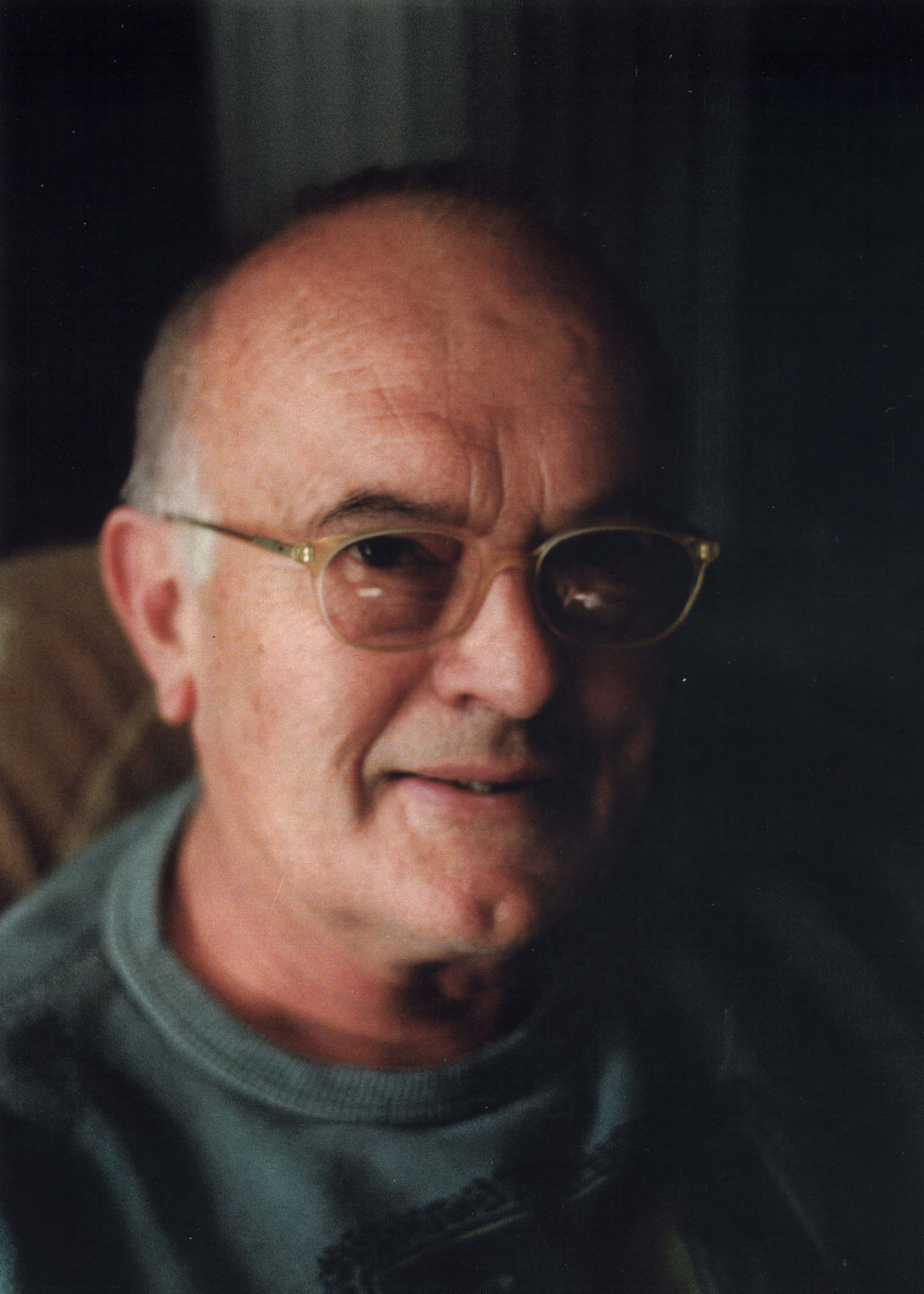
- Born: 4 July 1935
- Died: 13 September 2008 (aged 73); Kalamazoo, Michigan
- Education: St. Olaf College; Luther Seminary; McGill University
- Occupation: Islamicist
- Spouse: Yumi Takahashi-Ede
- Writing career
- Subject: Islamic Studies
- Notable work: Guide to Islam.

David Ede (4 July 1935 – 13 September 2008) was an American scholar of Islam.

== Biography ==
David Ede was born on July 4, 1935, as the son of a Lutheran minister. He studied Lutheran theology at St. Olaf College and Luther Theological Seminary and received bachelor's degrees from these institution in 1957 and 1961. Subsequently, he studied Islam at the McGill University Institute of Islamic Studies where he received a master's degree in 1967 and his doctorate with honors in 1978.

He started his teaching career as an instructor at Augsburg College in Minneapolis and McGill University in Montreal before moving to the Western Michigan University Department of Comparative Religion where he taught Islamic Studies from 1970 to 2008 and served as department head at the time of his death in 2008.

His Guide to Islam remains an essential reference work. It lists a wide range of reference materials and historical works from pre-Islamic to modern times, as well as publications on religious thought, law, art, and other topics, with ample annotations.

== Selected bibliography ==
- Guide to Islam. Boston, Mass.: G.K. Hall, 1983.
  - Reviews: The Muslim World, 74: 204–237 (1984); The International Journal of African Historical Studies, Vol. 18, No. 1, pp. 188–190 (1985); Choice, Vol. 21, p. 1444 (1984).
- Mullā Ṣadrā and the problem of freedom and determinism: a critical study of the Risālah fīl̓-qaḍā ̓wal̓-qadar. McGill University Press, 1980; dissertation, 1978 .
- Some considerations on the freedom-determinism controversy in classical Islamic theology. McGill University, 1967 .
- "Ḥasan al-Baṣrī, al-", Encyclopædia Britannica 2006.
- "David Ede." Obituaries: , , ,.

== See also ==
- List of Islamic and Muslim related topics
- Islamic studies
- McGill University Institute of Islamic Studies
- Western Michigan University
