= Nicholas Epley =

Academic and author

Nicholas Epley is a behavioral scientist and professor at the University of Chicago Booth School of Business. He is known for his research on social cognition, perspective-taking, anthropomorphism, and human judgment, as well as his work on the psychology of social connection. His research has been featured in publications including The New York Times, The Wall Street Journal, and National Geographic. Epley is the author of Mindwise: How We Understand What Others Think, Believe, Feel and Want (2014) and the forthcoming A Little More Social: How Small Choices Can Make Us Happier, Healthier, and Better Connected (2026).

== Early life and education ==
Nicholas Epley grew up in a small town in Iowa, where he played football. He attended St. Olaf College, where he earned a Bachelor of Arts degree in psychology and philosophy in 1996. While at St. Olaf, Epley played college football as an offensive lineman (breaking his nose in his first game) and worked as a carpenter. As an undergraduate, he published his first scientific paper and completed an independent study in moral theory. Epley went on to earn his Ph.D. in psychology from Cornell University in 2001.

== Career ==
Epley began his academic career at Harvard University, where he served as an assistant professor from 2001 to 2004. He joined the University of Chicago Booth School of Business in 2005, first as an assistant professor and later as a professor of behavioral science. In 2010, he was named the John Templeton Keller Professor of Behavioral Science. He became a Neubauer Family Faculty Fellow in 2015. Epley also serves as director of the Roman Family Center for Decision Research and teaches an MBA course on ethics and happiness.

== Research ==
Epley’s research focuses primarily on social cognition, perspective-taking, and intuitive human judgment. His research has been funded by the National Science Foundation and the John Templeton Foundation.

Much of Epley’s early research and articles focused on anthropomorphism, such as his 2007 study outlining three psychological determinants for whether or not a person was likely to anthropomorphize, his 2008 study on motivational determinants of anthropomorphism, and his 2014 study outlining how anthropomorphism increases trust in autonomous vehicles. In 2022, Quartz referred to him as “the world’s foremost anthropomorphism expert” in an article about people talking to plants, pets, and cars. His perspectives on the subject have been featured in publications such as The New Yorker.

In 2014, he partnered with Assistant Professor Juliana Schroeder to research how much people benefit from spontaneous social interaction with strangers. Their findings were published in the Journal of Experimental Psychology, and they later partnered with the BBC to replicate the study. This research has been cited by publications such as the New York Times and NPR.

In 2022, Epley published a study with fellow behavioral scientist Xuan Zhao that found “performing acts of kindness increases well-being, yet people can be reluctant to ask for help that would enable others’ kindness.” The study, along with Epley himself, were featured in such publications as National Geographic, the New York Times, and CNBC. He also partnered with Zhao on research about compliments, which was featured by Psychology Today the year prior.

Epley’s research has also covered topics such as gift-giving (featured by CNN), egocentrism, anchoring and adjustment.

== Publications ==
Epley is the author of Mindwise: How We Understand What Others Think, Believe, Feel, and Want, published in 2014 by Knopf. The book explores how people perceive the thoughts and feelings of others, drawing on research in social cognition and psychology.

He is currently working on a second book, A Little More Social: How Small Choices Can Make Us Happier, Healthier, and Better Connected, scheduled for release in 2026.

== Awards and recognition ==
In 2008, Epley received the Theoretical Innovation Award from the Society for Personality and Social Psychology. In 2011, he received with the Distinguished Scientific Award for Early Career Contribution to Psychology from the American Psychological Association.

In 2015, his book Mindwise earned the Book Prize for the Promotion of Social and Personality Science from the Society for Personality and Social Psychology. That same year, Epley was named among the “100 Most Influential in Business Ethics” by Ethisphere. In 2018, he received the Career Trajectory Award from the Society for Experimental Social Psychology.

Epley has also been recognized by Poets & Quants as one of the "World’s Best 40 Under 40 Business School Professors".
