= Loran Nordgren =

American behavioral scientist and author

Loran F. Nordgren is an American professor of psychology who studies the adoption of new ideas and behaviors. In 2020 he became a professor at Northwestern University's Kellogg School of Management. He is the co-author of The Human Element: Overcoming the Resistance That Awaits New Ideas.

Nordgren completed a B.A. in psychology, magna cum laude, in 2001 at St. Olaf College. He was a Fulbright scholar and completed a Ph.D. in social psychology with distinction at the University of Amsterdam. He was recognized as one of Poets & Quants’ 40 under 40 business school professors. Nordgren is the founder of Candor, a software company that promotes bias-free collaboration and feedback. In 2009, he was a social and experimental psychologist and assistant professor at Northwestern's Kellogg School of Management.

Nordren received the Theoretical Innovation Award of the Society of Personality and Social Psychology and the De Finnetti Prize from the European Association for Decision Making.

== Selected publications ==
- Nordgren, Loran; Schonthal, David Alan (5 October 2021). The Human Element: Overcoming the Resistance That Awaits New Ideas. Wiley. ISBN 978-1119765042. OCLC 1293474669.
