= Mark Almli =

American athlete and coach (1908–1967)

Biographical details
- Born: June 7, 1908; Minnesota, U.S.
- Died: June 11, 1967 (aged 59); Northfield, Minnesota, U.S.

Playing career

Baseball
- 1933–1934: Superior Blues
- Position(s): Second baseman, catcher

Coaching career (HC unless noted)

Football
- 1943–1945: St. Olaf

Basketball
- 1942–1957: St. Olaf

Baseball
- 1943–1949: St. Olaf

Head coaching record
- Overall: 110–153 (college basketball)

Mark Heitman Almli (June 7, 1908 – June 11, 1967) was a minor league baseball player and collegiate American football, basketball and baseball coach. He served as the head men's basketball coach at St. Olaf College in Northfield, Minnesota from 1942 to 1957. He also served as the school's head football and baseball coach, with the St. Olaf's home baseball field being named in his honor.
