= Helen Piwnica-Worms =

- Born: 1957 (age 68–69)
- Spouse: David R. Piwnica-Worms
- Children: 2

Academic background
- Education: BA, Biology, 1979, St. Olaf College; PhD, microbiology and immunology, 1984, Duke University School of Medicine
- Thesis: Characterization of ribonucleic acids synthesized in vivo and in vitro by vesicular stomatitis virus (1984)

Academic work
- Institutions: MD Anderson Cancer Center; Washington University School of Medicine; Alvin J. Siteman Cancer Center

Helen Margaret Piwnica-Worms (born 1957) is an American cell-cycle researcher. Since 2013, she has served as vice provost of science at the MD Anderson Cancer Center and professor in MD Anderson's Department of Cancer Biology.

== Early life and education ==
Piwnica-Worms was born in 1957. She received her undergraduate degree in biology from St. Olaf College in 1979 and a Ph.D. in microbiology and immunology from Duke University.

== Career ==
After completing her postdoctoral training at the Dana–Farber Cancer Institute (1988), she held a non-tenure track instructor position at Dana–Farber Cancer Institute and Harvard University (1988-1989). Piwnica-Worms joined the faculty at Tufts University School of Medicine (1989-1992). Between 1992 and 1994, she was an associate professor at Dana-Farber and Harvard. In 1994, she moved to Washington University in St. Louis (WashU) who were recruiting experts in cell cycle control. She was subsequently appointed the Gerty T. Cori Professor and Chair of Cell Biology and Physiology and Professor of Internal Medicine, and served as the associate director of Basic Science at the Alvin J. Siteman Cancer Center. During her tenure at WashU, Piwnica-Worms's research focused on the regulation of the human cell division cycle and how perturbation in its control contributes to human cancer. As such, she began testing ways to use CHK1 inhibitors to stop damaged cells from dividing. During this time, Piwnica-Worms was named a Fellow of the American Academy of Arts and Sciences in 2007.

As a result of her research, Piwnica-Worms was promoted to head of the Department of Cell Biology and Physiology at Washington University School of Medicine in 2011. In 2013, Piwnica-Worms was recruited to join the MD Anderson Cancer Center as their vice provost of science and professor in MD Anderson's Department of Cancer Biology. During this time, she was also elected a member of the National Academy of Medicine for advancing the understanding and treatment of cancer. In 2019, Piwnica-Worms and her research team discovered that triple-negative breast cancer cells could develop resistance to frontline, or neoadjuvant, chemotherapy by transiently turning on molecular pathways that protect the cells.

== Personal life ==
Piwnica-Worms is married to her high school sweetheart, radiologist, and biochemist David R. Piwnica-Worms. They have a daughter and a son.
