= Kurt Westerberg =

American composer (born 1950)

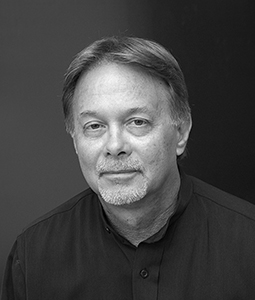
Kurt Westerberg

Kurt Westerberg is a composer who was born in Naperville, Illinois in 1950. His mother was a mezzo-soprano and pianist which sparked an early interest in music. He began his musical studies at age five with piano lessons. By age ten he was composing his first pieces for himself.

In 1968, he started his undergraduate degree in piano studies at St. Olaf College in Northfield, Minnesota. While at St. Olaf, his interest in composition grew and he graduated in 1972 with a Bachelor of Music in Composition.

It was in the midst of the student protests among college campuses across the United States in 1972 that Westerberg wrote politically charged works like De Profundis for chorus, brass and rhythm ensemble, and dancers. This composition would go on to be his first well known work and was played in Washington, DC by his fellow St. Olaf student musicians.

During his time at St. Olaf, he took lessons with G. Winston Cassler, Arthur Campbell as well as studying with Alan Stout (composer) at Northwestern University. It was through them that he was exposed to the works of Charles Ives and György Ligeti. These composers would become a large influence in Westerberg's style.

== Postgraduate life and career ==
After graduating from St. Olaf College, Westerberg began his Master's studies at Northwestern University in Evanston, Illinois, where he studied with Alan Stout (composer). Westerberg then went on to complete a doctorate at Northwestern University as well. During this time, he was hired as an adjunct professor at DePaul University School of Music, where he initially taught aural training.

In 1987, Westerberg joined the faculty of the composition department at DePaul University as a full-time professor under then-head George Flynn. Flynn acted as a mentor to Westerberg throughout his teaching and compositional career, and the two released a combined album May 15, 2014, entitled Dual Visions. Dual Visions includes Westerberg's composition Vision and Prayer on a text by Dylan Thomas. Westerberg also released an album of his own instrumental compositions in 2010, entitled Uncertain Light with Southport Records and featuring the Lithuanian National Philharmonic Orchestra. Uncertain Light includes the works Winter Light (1997), Piano Trio (2003), Fantasy for violin and piano (2005), and Concerto for Wind Ensemble (1987). Both albums were released on the Southport record label.

In addition to teaching and composing, Westerberg also became the music director at St. Paul's Lutheran Church in Evanston, Illinois, in 1998, after years of playing organ at other parishes in the north suburbs of Chicago.

Westerberg spends much of his time teaching and fulfilling administrative duties at DePaul University, and currently composes approximately two or three new works each year.

== Aesthetic ==
Westerberg turned his focus and efforts from piano to composition during his college years in the turbulent 1960s and 70s and tried to use bits of different kinds of music he knew at the time (rock vamps, atonal choromaticism) to produce "anti-war pieces with these undertones of somehow trying to address the conflicts that were going on during that time period."

When Westerberg graduated, he moved away from his anti-war aesthetic and attempted to explore other types of music unfamiliar to him. Through this exploration, his style of composition solidified into "a collage, sound mass style that then refined itself into a more consistently chromatic, but not serial [style], one that emphasize[s] line...so that behind even the strangest series of events, there was still some kind of melodic line..."

American composer Charles Ives had a large hand in influencing Westerberg's compositions, specifically with the concept of collage, polyrhythmic lines, and construct layers. The ruggedness of Ives' compositions also trickled down onto Westerberg from the line of composition teachers before him, specifically Alan Stout (composer) and Stout's teacher Henry Cowell.

After graduating from St. Olaf College, Westerberg familiarized himself with the idea of sound mass from European composers such as Krzysztof Penderecki and György Ligeti.

As a result of developing his compositional style in the middle of the 20th Century, Westerberg was influenced heavily by the many forms of chromaticism in the contemporary music scene at the time. Westerberg individualizes his style by separating chromaticism from serialism, leaving serialism behind when incorporating chromaticism into his compositions.

In addition to 20th Century concepts, the older idea of motif (music) is a large component of Westerberg's style. Westerberg was specifically influenced by Ludwig van Beethoven, Claude Debussy, and Béla Bartók, fascinated with how these composers worked with different musical motifs over the course of a work, how they were able to compress, stretch, and manipulate these themes over the course of a piece.

In the last 20 years, Westerberg has purposely began to incorporate extended techniques for different instruments into his compositions, such as his trio for three clarinets. His focus when using these techniques is to incorporate them naturally into the vocabulary, so that they are an expressive part of the piece, as opposed to existing for their own sake.

== Reception ==
Westerberg was first recognized for his composition De Profundis, which he composed in 1970 in his second year of undergraduate studies at St. Olaf College. The piece was composed in protest to the Vietnam War and the events at Kent State University and Jackson State University that year. Written for brass and percussion ensemble, jazz trio, chorus, and modern dancers, the work was premiered as a part of St. Olaf's 1971 homecoming events. Subsequent performances were heard in Minneapolis and Washington, D.C., where Westerberg and the St. Olaf musicians were invited for three performances in 1972. Invited by Rep. Albert Quie, R-Minn, the ensemble performed in the rotunda of the capitol building and in the House and old Senate office buildings. Rep. Quie remarked, "A fine performance-very powerful and moving." The performances in the United States capital received national attention, including an article in the Minneapolis Tribune and a National Public Radio interview with the composer.

In 1997, Westerberg was featured in the Critic's Choice Column of the Chicago Reader, where he was recognized for his abstract style influenced by Charles Ives and Henry Cowell by way of Alan Stout.

== Recent performances ==
- Night Music 1 for solo guitar (1994)
- Fantasy for violin and piano (2005)
- Sargasso for string quartet (1999)
- In Time of Silver Rain for SATB chorus and piano (2007)
- Fanfare for Brass and Percussion (2002; commissioned by DePaul University)
- Night Music III for two marimbas (2002)
- Rituals and Laments for solo percussionist (2009)
- Nomads for flute, clarinet, and cello (2011)
- Vision and Prayer for voices and chamber ensemble (2012)
- Ensembles and Monologues for clarinet trio (2013)
- Winterbourne for keomungo and chamber ensemble (2013)
- Fragments, Remnants, Shards for flute, harp, and piano (2014)
- Five Movements for Three Clarinets (2011)
- Fantasy and Chaconne for solo viola
- The Pianists for mixed chamber ensemble
- Scenes from Childhood for double woodwind quintet
