= Edward Sövik =

American architect

Edward Anders Sövik
- Born: 9 June 1918; Henan, China
- Died: 4 May 2014 (aged 95)
- Other name: Edward Sovik
- Education: St. Olaf College, Luther Seminary, Yale University
- Occupation: Architect
- Awards: Fellow of the American Institute of Architects

Edward Anders Sövik, also Sovik, (June 9, 1918 – May 4, 2014) was an American architect and author. His most influential book, Architecture for Worship, covered the modern period in church architecture.

== Early life ==
Sövik was born in 1918 in Henan province, China, a child of missionaries. After 17 years in China, Edward moved to the United States with his older sister and twin brother to attend college at St. Olaf College in Northfield, Minnesota. Professor Arnold Flaten influenced Edward to study art; Flaten had designed the Art Barn on campus. Sövik graduated in 1939. Edward moved to New York City to study painting at the Art Students League, then returned to Saint Paul, Minnesota, in 1940 to study theology at Luther Seminary with the hope to serve God through art.

In the summer of 1941, sensing the inevitability of war, Ed Sövik enlisted in the Marine Corps. He served during the Second World War as a night fighter pilot in the Pacific theater, and was awarded a Purple Heart and a Distinguished Flying Cross. After the war, Sövik was inspired by an officer to study architecture and enrolled at Yale University where the program emphasized pragmatism, abstraction, and new materials and technology. He became increasingly interested in church design and his senior thesis, “A Design for the Lars Boe Memorial Chapel, St. Olaf College, Northfield Minnesota,” was a modern church that used contemporary building materials thoughtfully. After graduation, he returned to Northfield, Minnesota, to start an architecture firm and teach at St. Olaf College.

== Architecture career ==
In 1953, Sövik partnered with Sewell J. Mathre (1922-2016) and Norman E. Madson (1922-2013) to form Sovik, Mathre & Madson (now SMSQ Architects). The practice focused on building projects for religious and educational use. He designed buildings for his alma mater and employer St. Olaf College, Carleton College, Concordia College (Moorhead, Minnesota), Stevens College, and the University of Minnesota. Sövik was president of the American Institute of Architects Minnesota chapter.

Sövik was also a professor of art at St. Olaf College and designed, or assisted in the design of, 20 buildings on campus. As a professor, Sövik published many monographs and articles. He cites six scholars as influences on his work leading up to the 1973 publication of Architecture for Worship: liturgist Gregory Dix, liturgical architecture scholar J. G. Davies, liturgical historian Josef Jungmann, Langer, theologian and church historian Hans Lietzmann, and Lohmeyer. In this text, Sövik argued for church spaces that are not set apart for holy rituals, but are adaptable and suitable as "non-church" buildings.

The design of Northfield Methodist Church in 1964 became a template for his "non-church" approach where it is flexible for both liturgical and non-liturgical activities so the building could be a resource for service. Saint Leo Catholic Church (1968–69) in Pipestone, Minnesota, and Central United Methodist Church (1971–72; now, Trinity United Methodist Church) in Charles City, Iowa, further showcased this approach with exterior facades resembling other public buildings and constructed of concrete, brick, steel, and glass and without a single, fixed focal point. The floorplan featured a large gathering area adjacent to the primary entrance to the "centrum." These design elements were rooted in the idea that people, not architecture, made spaces sacred.

== Legacy and honors ==
Sövik received more than a dozen state and national design awards. He was named a Member of the American Institute of Architects in 1953 and a Fellow of the American Institute of Architects in 1967. In 1981 he was the first recipient of the Edward S. Frey Award from the AIA Interfaith Forum on Religion, Art, and Architecture. Modern Liturgy magazine named him the "most influential liturgical architect of the past twenty years".

== Projects (partial list) ==
- Northfield United Methodist Church, Northfield, Minnesota (1964)
- Summit Methodist Church, Columbus, Ohio (1977)
- Urness Recital Hall, Christiansen Hall of Music, St. Olaf College (1974)
- First Presbyterian Church, Lawrence, Kansas (1968)

== Bibliography ==
- Sövik, Edward A. (1973). Architecture for worship. Minneapolis, Minnesota: Augsburg Publishing House. ISBN 0-8066-1320-3.
- Sovik, E. A. (1960). The Shape of Our Places of Worship.
- Sovik, E. A. (1960). The Architect as an Artist in the Church: Address Given at the Fall Retreat of the Dept. of Church Building and the Church Architectural Guild of America, Princeton, Sept. 22, 1960. National Council of the Churches of Christ in the U.S.A.
- Sövik, Edward Anders (1980). Accessible Church Buildings. Pilgrim Press, The/United Church Press. ISBN 978-0-8298-0445-4.
- Schwandt, Pamela; Krey, Gary Stuart De; Lagerquist, L. DeAne; College, St. Olaf (1999). Called to serve: St. Olaf and the vocation of a church college. St. Olaf College. ISBN 978-600-01-1621-7. Contributor.
