= Neil A. Kjos Music Company =

American music publisher

- Founded: 1936; 89 years ago
- Founder: Neil A. Kjos
- Country of origin: United States
- Headquarters location: San Diego, California
- Publication types: Printed music
- Official website: Official website

The Neil A. Kjos Music Company is an American music publisher based in San Diego, California. It has published a large number of books used to teach music, most notably the Standard of Excellence series of books and software.

== History ==
The Neil A. Kjos Music Company was founded by its namesake in Chicago in 1936 as a one-room operation in space rented from the Lyons Band Instrument Company. By 1957, the company had outgrown the premises at Lyons and built a 20,000 square foot plant in Park Ridge, Illinois. Kjos Jr. soon began working for the company after receiving degrees from St. Olaf College (Northfield, Minnesota) and Teachers College, Columbia University (NYC), and serving in the 524th Air Force Band. During his studies, Kjos met Jane Smisor Bastien, future author of the best-selling piano methods around the world. Kjos acquired the title of president when his father, Neil Sr., retired in 1969.

In 1973, Kjos determined that the company should expand to a part of the country with a more reasonable climate. A location in San Diego, California, was selected for the construction of a new plant. After completion in 1975, the Neil A. Kjos Music Company operated from both San Diego and Park Ridge. In 1985, the Park Ridge location closed, and all operations were transferred to the newly expanded facility in San Diego. Kjos's two children, Mark and Tim, joined the company in the mid-1980s. Upon their father's retirement in 2000, his sons took over.
