= Jack Nelson-Pallmeyer =

American academic

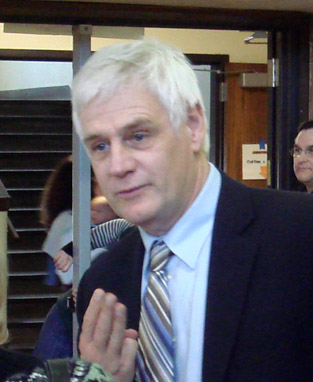
Nelson-Pallmeyer at a Minnesota Senate District Convention

Jack Nelson-Pallmeyer is an American academic. He sought the endorsement of the Democratic-Farmer-Labor Party as a candidate for U.S. Senate in 2008, but was defeated by Al Franken.

== Background ==
Nelson-Pallmeyer was born as the youngest of four brothers to parents Wayne and Audrey Nelson in 1951. He was born and raised in Minnesota. He went to high school in Coon Rapids, Minnesota, and then attended St. Olaf College in Northfield. After graduating with a B.A. in political science, he earned a Master's of Divinity from Union Theological Seminary in New York City. He has written several books on war, hunger issues, theology, and foreign policy. For the past 15 years, he has been a professor at the University of St. Thomas, in St. Paul, Minnesota. He is married to his wife of 34 years, Sara, with whom he has three daughters, Hannah, Audrey and Naomi.

He is a pacifist and a Lutheran.

== Views ==
In his book Brave New World Order (first published 1992, reissued 2017), Nelson-Pallmeyer provides a definition of "national security state". (Note: Nelson-Pallmeyer follows on from the work of José Comblin who is "perhaps the most widely read and quoted analyst of national-security doctrine in Latin America") He describes seven defining characteristics, starting with the military exerting influence over economic and political affairs and progressing through maintaining an appearance of democracy while ultimate power rests with the national security establishment; concentration of capital by elites; obsession with enemies; and restricting and distorting information, among others. He summarizes how this found expression in El Salvador and discusses "similar dynamics" within the United States.

== 2006 U.S. House election ==
Nelson-Pallmeyer announced his intention to challenge incumbent Democrat Martin Sabo for Minnesota's 5th congressional district U.S. House of Representatives seat in early 2006. After Sabo announced he was retiring, several other Democrats announced their intentions to run for the House seat. At the district convention in May, Keith Ellison won the endorsement after Nelson-Pallmeyer withdrew from the endorsement process and threw his support to Ellison, who went on to win the general election.

== 2008 U.S. Senate election ==
On October 10, 2007, Nelson-Pallmeyer announced his candidacy for the U.S. Senate seat held by Republican Norm Coleman. He ran against Al Franken for the DFL Party nomination. After a long fight for the party's nomination, culminating at the 2008 State DFL convention in Rochester, Nelson-Pallmeyer lost the nomination to Franken.

== Books by Jack Nelson-Pallmeyer ==
- Hunger for Justice: the Politics of Food and Faith. Maryknoll: Orbis Books, 1980.
- The Politics of Compassion. Maryknoll: Orbis Books, 1986.
- War Against the Poor: Low-Intensity Conflict and Christian Faith. Maryknoll: Orbis Books,1989.
- Brave New World Order: Must We Pledge Allegiance? Maryknoll: Orbis Books 1992.
- Families Valued: Parenting and Politics for the Good of All Children. New York: Friendship Press, 1996.
- School of the Assassins. Maryknoll: Orbis Books, 1997.
- Harvest of Cain. District of Columbia: EPICA, 2001
- Jesus Against Christianity: Reclaiming the Missing Jesus. Harrisburg: Trinity Press International, 2001.
- School of the Assassins: Guns, Greed and Globalization (2nd Edition). Maryknoll: Orbis Books, 2001.
- Is Religion Killing Us? Violence in the Bible and the Quran. Harrisburg: Trinity Press International, 2003.
- Worship in the Spirit of Jesus: Theology, Liturgy and Songs without Violence. (2005) with Bret Hesla. Cleveland: Pilgrim Press/United Church Press, 2005.
- Saving Christianity from Empire. New York: Continuum International, 2005.
- Authentic Hope: It's the end of the world as we know it but soft landings are possible New York: Orbis Books, 2012.
