= Frank Bures =

American writer (born 1971)

- Born: November 3, 1971 (age 54)
- Occupation: Writer
- Writing career
- Genres: Narrative nonfiction, essays
- Subjects: Culture, travel, language, science, outdoors
- Website: frankbures.com

Frank Bures (born November 3, 1971) is an American writer and essayist. He is the author of Pushing the River: An Epic Battle, a Lost History, a Near Death, and Other True Canoeing Stories, The Geography of Madness: Penis Thieves, Voodoo Death and the Search for the Meaning of the World's Strangest Syndromes, and the editor of Under Purple Skies: The Minneapolis Anthology. He produces audio history tours for VoiceMap, and his work has been selected for the Best American Travel Writing, the Lowell Thomas Award and other awards.

== Personal life ==
Bures grew up in Winona, Minnesota, graduated from St. Olaf College in 1995, and has lived in Tanzania, Italy, Thailand and other places. He lives in Minneapolis.

== Works ==
=== Books ===
- Pushing the River: An Epic Battle, a Lost History, a Near Death, and Other True Canoeing Stories (Minnesota Historical Society Press, 2025)
- The Shape of the World: Essays on Travel, Culture, and Belief from Rotary Magazine (2022)
- Under Purple Skies: The Minneapolis Anthology (Belt Publishing, 2019)
- The Geography of Madness: Penis Thieves, Voodoo Death, and the Search for the Meaning of the World's Strangest Syndromes (Melville House, 2016)
