= Daniel Moe =

American choral conductor, composer, and pedagogue

Daniel T. Moe
- Born: November 2, 1926; Minot, North Dakota
- Died: May 24, 2012 (aged 85); Sarasota, Florida
- Occupations: Composer; Conductor
- Website: www.danielmoemusic.com

Daniel Troen Moe (November 2, 1926 – May 24, 2012) was an American choral conductor, composer, and pedagogue. He was director of choral organizations for the University of Iowa, professor of choral conducting at Oberlin College Conservatory of Music, and founding music director of Key Chorale in Sarasota, Florida. He was a published composer and author. He was once hailed by The New Yorker music critic Andrew Porter as "that dean of choral conductors."

== Early years and education ==
Moe was born in 1926 in Minot, North Dakota the grandson of Norwegian immigrants and the son of a Lutheran pastor. Moe began his musical training at age five. He studied piano and clarinet, and sang in the children's choir at Olivet Lutheran Church in Fargo, North Dakota, his father's parish. In junior high and high school, he participated in school bands, orchestras, and choirs. As a senior in high school, Moe took up the tenor saxophone so he could play jazz, a form of music he had a growing interest in, and which would affect future compositions such as the three-movement Psalm Concertato.

In 1944, after graduating high school, Moe entered the V-5 Aviation Cadet Training Program (USN) (NavCad) program. He played tenor saxophone and clarinet for navy bands.

In 1946, Moe left the navy to attend Concordia College (Moorhead, Minnesota). He started as a pre-theological student but changed his major to music. He sang in The Concordia Choir under Paul J. Christiansen. He graduated in 1949 with a degree in music.

After graduation, Moe returned to Fargo and directed the choir at his home parish, Olivet Lutheran Church. for a few months. This would be his first job as a choral conductor. He would go on to become a leader in sacred music circles as a hymn composer, author, and lecturer.

In February 1950, Moe began a master's degree at Hamline University, and secured a conducting position at Lutheran Bible Institute (now Golden Valley Lutheran College). Three weeks into his studies, however, the university announced it would discontinue that degree program. He transferred to the University of Washington. While there, he was employed as a conductor at Ballard First Lutheran Church. He completed his master's degree in 1952.

Moe became a lay minister and choir director at Hope Lutheran Church in Powell, Wyoming. In late 1953, he was appointed director of choral activities at University of Denver, where he remained until 1959. While at the University of Denver, Moe was also a lecturer in church music at the Iliff School of Theology, a Methodist seminary, and directed the choirs at Augustana Lutheran Church and Central Presbyterian Church.

In 1956, the Lutheran World Federation awarded Moe a grant to study in Germany at the Kirchenmusikschule, and in 1959, the Danforth Foundation awarded him a grant to work on his doctorate in composition. He took a leave of absence from the University of Denver and went to the University of Iowa for his doctoral study, writing his thesis on his own choral and wind ensemble composition, “Te Deum Laudamus.”

Further studies at Aspen Music Festival and School followed.

== Conductor ==
After completing the Ph.D. in 1961, Moe accepted a faculty position as director of choral organizations at the University of Iowa, where he would develop distinguished graduate programs in choral conducting. While in Iowa City, Iowa, he also conducted the choir at Gloria Dei Lutheran Church.

Moe was appointed professor of choral conducting at Oberlin Conservatory of Music in 1972. He served in this role for 20 years.

After retiring from academia to Sarasota, Florida, Moe served as the first director of that city's symphony chorus, Key Chorale, a position he held for 21 years. During the 1994–1995 academic year, he served as visiting professor and choral conductor at his alma mater, Concordia College, as René Clausen's sabbatical replacement, and for one semester in 2001 at Boston University as sabbatical replacement for Ann Howard Jones.

Moe served as an adjunct professor of music at New College of Florida in Sarasota, where he conducted the New College Chorus from fall 2005 until fall 2010.

== Author ==
- Arthur, John, and Daniel Moe. Contemporary Liturgy. Chicago: Lutheran Student Association of America, 1963.
- Moe, Daniel. Basic Choral Concepts. Minneapolis, Minn: Augsburg Pub. House, 1972. N.B. Augsburg Publishing House is now 1517 Media.
- Moe, Daniel. Problems in Conducting. Minneapolis, Minn: Augsburg Pub. House, 1973. [A collection of conducting exercises for use in undergraduate and graduate college courses.]
- Moe, Daniel. Responsibilities of the Choir Member. Minneapolis, Minn: Augsburg Pub. House. [A pamphlet intended for distribution to singers in choirs.]
- Moe, Daniel. “The Choral Conductor and Twentieth-Century Choral Music.” Choral Conducting Symposium, by Harold A. Decker and Julius Herford, Prentice Hall, 1988, pp. 151–165.

== Composer ==
Moe composed in a distinctive style, marked by quartal and quintal harmony, mixed meter, quasi-tonality, and reiterated rhythms with slight variations (often syncopation). He composed mostly for choir, either a cappella, or accompanied by organ, piano, brass, or orchestra. His composition teachers included Paul J. Christiansen, Normand Lockwood, and Darius Milhaud. Three doctoral dissertations have been written, in whole or in part, on Moe's compositions. Jan Bender composed "Variations on a theme by Daniel Moe: I lift up my eyes" for solo organ. Moe's most notable works are:

- "Hosanna to the Son of David" (1956) for mixed choir (SATB) and organ (or brass quintet). This anthem is standard repertoire for church choirs and college/university choirs.
- "The greatest of these is love" (1958) for solo voice and piano or organ.
- "Cantata for Peace" (1971) written for mixed voices, trumpet, piano (or brass or organ), and narrator. Text from the Bible and No bars to manhood by Daniel Berrigan. Performed under Carma Romano Ireland, director of music for the Archdiocese of Denver at the opening Mass for World Youth Day 1993, celebrating the visit of Pope John Paul II.
- "Magnificat" (1974) for mixed voices and orchestra (or piano or organ). Commissioned for The 1974 Wyoming All State Chorus & Orchestra.
- "Requiem Motet" (2003) for mixed voices a cappella. Composed in memoriam for Paul J. Christiansen.

Moe composed music for several hymns that appeared in hymnals such as Hymnal: A Worship Book (Church of the Brethren, Mennonite), Hymns of the Saints (Reorganized Church of Jesus Christ of Latter-Day Saints), Rejoice in the Lord (Reformed Church in America), Ecumenical Praise, Lutheran Book of Worship (Evangelical Lutheran Church in America), The Hymnal 1982 (Episcopal Church), and More Hymns and Spiritual Songs (Episcopal Church).

Moe served as composer-in-residence for Church of the Redeemer, Sarasota, FL until his death in 2012.

== Awards and accolades ==
- Canticum Novum award from Wittenburg University
- Honorary citation from the Bruckner Society of America
- McGowan Memorial Award
- Danforth Foundation Fellowship
- Two honorary doctorates, including one from his alma mater, Concordia College (Moorhead, MN)
