= Hetland =

Hetland may refer to:

== Places ==
=== Norway ===
- Hetland Municipality, a former municipality near Stavanger in Rogaland county
- Hetland, Tysvær, a village near Aksdal in Tysvær municipality, Rogaland county
- Hetland Church, also known as Frue Church, a church in the city of Stavanger

=== United States ===
- Hetland, South Dakota, a town in Kingsbury county, South Dakota
- Hetland School, a historic school in Hetland, South Dakota

== People ==
- Hetland (surname), a list of people with the surname "Hetland"
