= Heitland =

Heitland is a surname. Notable people with the surname include:

- Ivy Heitland (1875–1895), English painter
- Margaret Heitland (1860–1938), British journalist and activist
- William Emerton Heitland (1847–1935), English classical scholar

== See also ==
- Hetland (surname)
