= Phyllis Zimmerman =

American composer, choral conductor and music educator

Phyllis E. Zimmerman (1934–2012) was an American composer, choral conductor, and music educator.

== Biography ==
Zimmerman was born in Pennsylvania and graduated from Thiel College in Greenville, Pennsylvania in 1956. She studied vocal performance at Concordia College in Moorhead, Minnesota with conductor Paul J. Christiansen, graduating in 1959. Zimmerman taught music and directed choirs at Churchill Area High School in Pittsburgh Pennsylvania before becoming the choral director at Santa Barbara (California) High School, where she taught from 1969 to 1995. Her choirs toured Europe several times and performed in Romania by invitation of the U.S. State Department.

During the late 1970s, Zimmerman was involved with the International League of Women Composers, which was absorbed into the International Alliance for Women in Music in 1995.

Following her retirement in 1995, Zimmerman founded the Canticle A Cappella Choir, a community choir that recorded several CDs and performed on National Public Radio and NBC-TV. Concordia College honored her as a Distinguished Alumna in 2006.

== Works ==
Much of Zimmerman's work can be heard on streaming platforms such as Spotify. Her choral compositions include:

- "Alleluia"
- "An Easter Carol"
- "Earth Chants"
- "Fog" (words by Carl Sandburg, music by Phyllis Zimmerman)
- "Four Settings of Poems by Sara Teasdale (Life Has Loveliness to Sell; To-night; Dusk in June; I Would Live in Your Love)"
- "Hodie Christus natus est"
- "Letting the Silence Sing"
- "My Song in the Night"
- "O Sing Unto the Lord"

== Choral arrangements ==
Her choral arrangements include:

- "Gentle Annie" (melody by Stephen Foster; arrangement by Phyllis Zimmerman)
- "King of Glory"
- "Simple Gifts"
- "Thy Little Ones, Dear Lord, Are We"
