= Arlene Buckneberg Ydstie =

American composer and conductor (1928–2025)

Arlene Dagmar Genevive Buckneberg Ydstie (April 28, 1928 – August 26, 2025) was an American composer, organist, and choral conductor. A native of Larson, North Dakota, she received a B.A. from Concordia College (Minnesota), where she studied choral conducting with Paul J. Christiansen. She married Richard Ydstie on December 21, 1952.

After her marriage, Arlene Ydstie studied composition at Central Washington State University, taught singing in Benton City, Washington, and was the church organist and choir director at Richland Lutheran Church in Richland, Washington.

Ydstie died on August 26, 2025, at the age of 97 in Seaside, Oregon.

Her compositions include:

== Musical Theatre ==
- (The) Case of the Counterfeit Santa (1984)
- Christopher Columbus (1982)
- Return of the Star (1983)
- Town Hall Christmas Tree
- (The) Burly Crew (1985)

== Vocal ==
- As Heaven's Rain (choir 1977)
- As You Come and Go (SAB; 1979)
- Down the Aisle Country Style (women's choir; 1977)
- Erie Canal Boogie (women's choir; 1977)
- Family of God (choir; 1978)
- Five Loaves and Two Little Fishes (1977)
- Hosanna Today (women's choir; 1976)
- How Many Ways (choir; 1977)
- I Sing of a Maiden (1982)
- If There's a Song (choir or women's choir; 1975)
- If You Need a Friend (1981)
- Little Samuel (women's choir; 1977)
- Make Your Own World (women's choir; 1974)
- Many Generation Ago (1981)
- Moses Smote the Rock (1984)
- My Valley (choir; 1977)
- Ready or Not, Here He Comes (women's choir; 1977)
- Serendipity (SA; 1979)
- Sermon on the Mount (cantata; 1978)
- Somewhere There's a Song (choir; 1980)
- Song of the Shepherds (choir; also arranged for TTBB or SSA; 1974)
- Ten Generations Ago (bicentennial pageant; 1976)
- There is a Treasure (choir; 1982)
- To Be or Not to Be (choir; 1974)
- Walk to Me, Jesus (1976)
