= Basit Bilal Koshul =

Pakistani Sociologist

Dr. Basit Bilal Koshul
- ڈاکٹر باسط بلال کوشل
- Born: April 25, 1968 (age 58)
- Education: Drew University; University of Virginia
- Occupations: researcher, writer
- Writing career
- Genre: Philosophy
- Subjects: Philosophy of science Philosophy of religion Sociology of culture

Dr. Basit Bilal Koshul is a Pakistani sociologist, and a member of the Rehmatul-lil-Alameen Authority. Bilal Koshul is a professor at Lahore University of Management Sciences (LUMS). His areas of interest include the relationship between religion and modernity, the philosophy of science, the philosophy of religion, the sociology of culture, and the competition between modern Islam and the West. He is particularly interested in combining the ideas of Muhammad Iqbal, Charles Peirce and Max Weber.

He received his first PhD in Religion Sociology from Drew University in 2003. After teaching at Concordia College for four years, he began in 2006 at the LUMS School of Humanities, Social Sciences and Law. He completed his second PhD in 2011 from the University of Virginia.

== Authorship ==
He has several publications, including books.

- Koshul, Basit Bilal (2014). Max Weber and Charles Peirce: At the Crossroads of Science, Philosophy, and Culture. Lexington Books. ISBN 978-1498550840.
- Kepnes, S.; Koshul, B. (2007). Scripture, Reason, and the Contemporary Islam-West Encounter: Studying the "Other," Understanding the "Self". Palgrave Macmillan US. ISBN 978-1349536030. OCLC 647663612.
- Koshul, B. (2005). The postmodern significance of Max Weber's legacy. Springer. ISBN 978-1-4039-7887-5. OCLC 437187442.
- Hillier, H. C. (2015). Koshul, Basit Bilal (ed.). Muhammad Iqbal: Essays on the Reconstruction of Modern Muslim Thought. ISBN 9781474416078.
- Koshul, Basit Bilal (2002). Seeing, Knowing, Believing: Iqbal on Faith in the Modern World. OCLC 969718740.
- Koshul, Basit Bilal (2021). MUHAMMAD IQBAL IN DIALOGUE WITH AMERICAN PRAGMATISTS: John Dewey and Charles Sanders Peirce. ISBN 9781474459518.
- Koshul, Basit Bilal (2003). Weber's Disenchantment Thesis Revisited: A Postmodern Possibility of the Religious Significance of Scientific Rationality. OCLC 52715940.
- Koshul, Basit Bilal (2011). Max Weber, Charles Peirce, and the Integration of the Natur and Geisteswissenschaften. OCLC 778067685.
