= Margaret Evelyn Mauch =

American mathematician and university professor (1897–1987)

- Born: June 1, 1897; De Smet, South Dakota
- Died: November 16, 1987 (aged 90); Huron, South Dakota
- Burial place: Hetland, South Dakota, cemetery
- Education: Huron College; University of Chicago
- Occupations: Mathematician and professor
- Employer(s): Randolph College; Carleton College; University of Akron

Margaret Evelyn Mauch (1897–1987) was an American mathematician and university professor. She was one of the few women to earn a PhD in mathematics before World War II in the United States.

== Biography ==
Margaret Mauch was born in De Smet, South Dakota on June 1, 1897 to Henry Mauch and Norway-born Rose Brekhus. She spent her early years living in the area around De Smet and the 1900 census recorded shows that her family was living in Lake Preston.

Mauch attended public elementary and high schools in South Dakota. She studied at Huron College (now closed) in Huron, about thirty miles from De Smet. After receiving her bachelor's degree in 1919, she taught for a year at Winner High School in the south-central part of South Dakota. Thereafter, she worked for a year as principal of Edgerton High School in Minnesota. From 1921 to 1923, she attended the University of Chicago, where she received her master's degree in 1923 with a thesis in theoretical mechanics titled: The Motion of a Certain Rotating Bar.

From 1924 to 1925, she taught at the high school in Jacksonville, Florida, and then served as an instructor and assistant professor at the Randolph-Macon Woman's College (now Randolph College) in Lynchburg, Virginia, until 1929, when she returned to the University of Chicago to complete her PhD. In 1938, she received her doctorate under Leonard Eugene Dickson with a dissertation titled Extensions of Waring's Theorem on Seventh Powers. Dickson had already published some of her findings in 1933, identifying her as M.A. Mauch. According to Green:

"Although Mauch's degree was not conferred until 1938, she had obtained some of her results on Waring's theorem for seventh powers considerably earlier. In Dickson's 1933 article, Recent Progress on Waring's Theorem and its Generalizations, he mentions her work on page 721 at the end of the section he calls "Remarkable Empirical Generalizations of Waring's Theorem."

From 1934 to 1942, Mauch headed the mathematics department at the high school in Brookings, South Dakota, and then, until 1944, she was an instructor and assistant professor at Carleton College in Northfield, Minnesota. From 1944 to 1945, she was an instructor at Michigan State College (now Michigan State University), and in 1945 she became an assistant professor at the University of Akron in Ohio, where she was promoted to associate professor in 1950 and full professor in 1962. She retired from the university in 1963 but continued to teach there and was appointed professor emerita in 1966.

In 1966, Margaret Mauch and her younger sister, Ruby Mauch, moved back from Akron to Huron, South Dakota, to live with a brother. Margaret Mauch died in Huron at the Violet Tschetter Memorial Home at 90 on November 16, 1987. She was buried in the Hetland, South Dakota, cemetery.

== Memberships ==
Mauch's organizational affiliations, according to Judy Green:

- American Mathematical Society
- Mathematical Association of America
- Sigma Delta Epsilon
- Sigma Xi
- American Association of University Women
- American Association of University Professors
