= Hetland School =

- U.S. National Register of Historic Places
- Location within South Dakota Location within the United States
- Location: Park St., Hetland, South Dakota
- Coordinates: 44°22′43″N 97°14′11″W
- Area: 1 acre (0.40 ha)
- Built: 1904, 1920
- Built by: Melstad, M.A.
- Architect: Johnson, C.A.
- Architectural style: Italianate
- MPS: Schools in South Dakota MPS
- NRHP reference No.: 02000572
- Added to NRHP: May 30, 2002

The Hetland School, on Park Street in Hetland, South Dakota, was built in 1904. It was listed on the National Register of Historic Places in 2002. The listing included one contributing building and three contributing objects.

It was designed by C.A. Johnson. A 1920 addition was built by M.A. Melstad.

The main part of the building is 52 by 68 feet (16 m × 21 m) in plan.
