= Ingebrikt Grose =

Ingebrikt Fredrick Grose or Ingebricks F. Grose (1862 – October 10, 1939) was an author, college professor and founding president of Concordia College, Moorhead, Minnesota.

== Background ==
Inglebrikt was the first child of Johan and Ingeborg Grose. His father, Johan had arrived in the United States during 1854 from Stetten, then a part of Prussia. His mother, Ingeborg emigrated to the United States from the western Norway during the same year. His parents were married in Wisconsin in 1860 and moved to Kenyon, Minnesota, where Grose was born in 1862. Grose attended primary school in Kenyon, after which he traveled to St. Olaf College in Northfield, Minnesota. While at St. Olaf College, Grose married Mary Jacobson. He attended Luther College in Decorah, Iowa, after which he returned to St. Olaf College as a Professor.

== Career ==
His education had been strongly influenced by Reverend Bernt Julius Muus, who was the founder of St. Olaf College. At the advice of Reverend Muus, Grose was selected to be the founding President of Concordia College in Moorhead, Minnesota. On Reformation Day, October 31, 1891, the college was officially dedicated by Reverend Gjermund Hoyme, President of the United Norwegian Lutheran Church. The college students were mainly children of Norwegian immigrants. Ingebrikt Grose was president of Concordia College from 1891 until 1893.

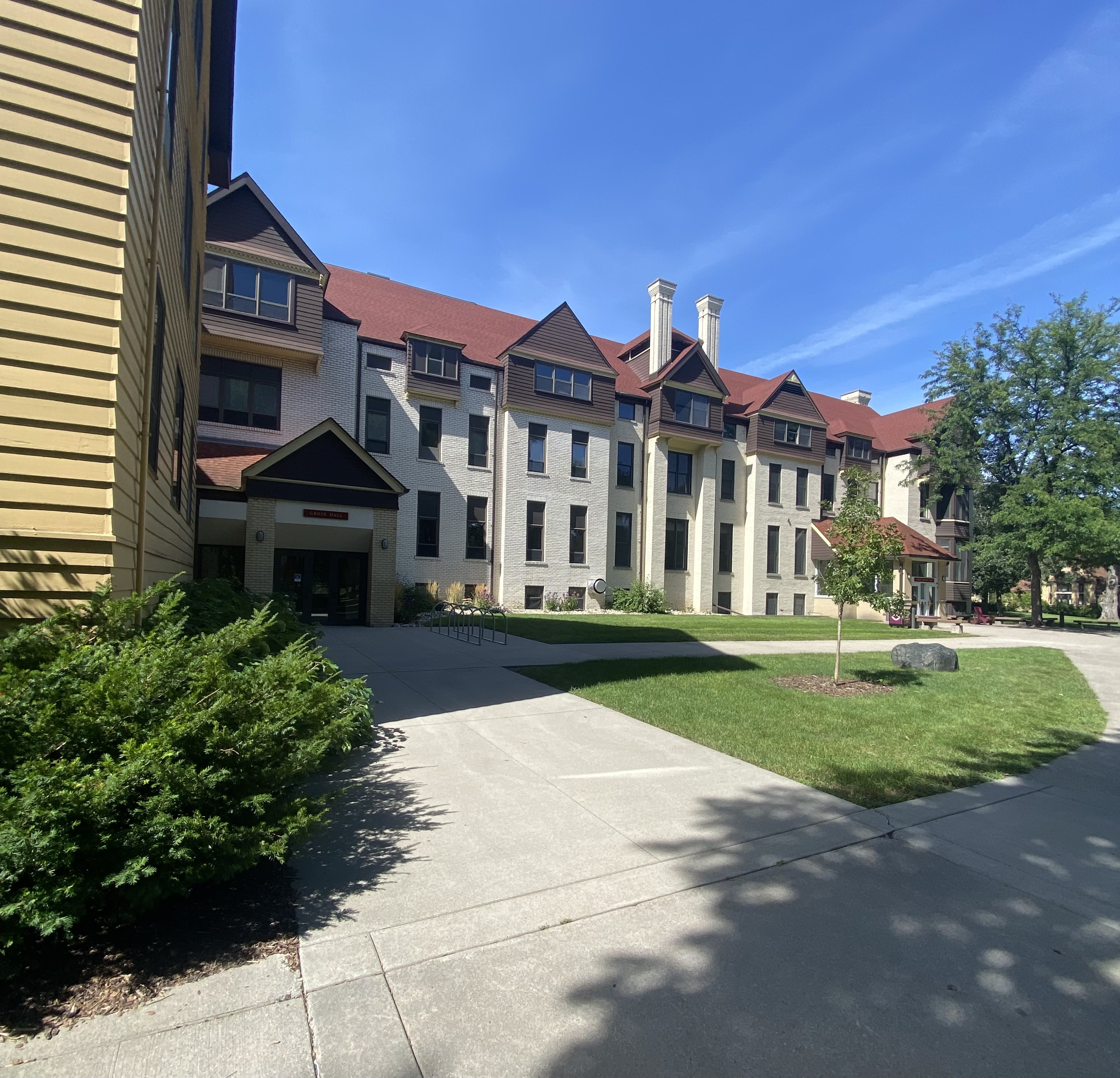
Grose Hall at Concordia College

Thereafter Grose returned to St. Olaf College to continue his teaching and administration activities for the remainder of his career. Grose wrote a history of St. Olaf College for the 50th anniversary celebration in 1925. Grose died in 1939 and he is buried at Gol Lutheran Church Cemetery in Kenyon, Minnesota. Grose Hall at Concordia College was named after Grose, the first president of the college.

== Selected bibliography ==
- Fifty Memorable Years at St. Olaf, Marking the History of the "College on the Hill" from Its Founding in 1874 to Its Golden Jubilee Celebration in 1925. (Northfield News, Northfield, MN: 1925)
- The Beginnings of St. Olaf College (Norwegian-American Historical Association, Volume V: Page 110)
