= Concordia College (Moorhead, Minnesota) =

Private college in Moorhead, Minnesota, US

- Former name: Concordia Academy (1891–1927)
- Motto: Soli Deo Gloria
- Motto in English: "Glory to God Alone"
- Type: Private liberal arts college
- Established: October 31, 1891; 134 years ago
- Religious affiliation: Evangelical Lutheran Church in America
- Academic affiliations: NAICU, Space-grant
- Endowment: $212.3 million (2025)
- President: Colin Irvine
- Dean: Susan Larson
- Students: 1,935 (fall 2024)
- Undergraduates: 1,864 (fall 2024)
- Postgraduates: 71 (fall 2024)
- Location: Moorhead, Minnesota, U.S. 46°51′55″N 96°46′12″W
- Campus: Urban, 113 acres (46 ha)
- Colors: Maroon & Gold
- Nickname: Cobbers
- Sporting affiliations: NCAA Division III – MIAC
- Mascots: Kernel Cobb, Niblet
- Website: concordiacollege.edu
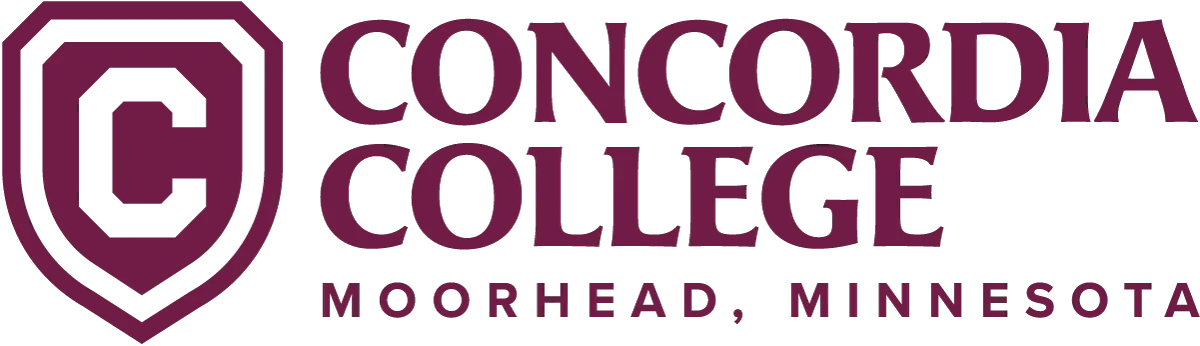

Concordia College is a private liberal arts college in Moorhead, Minnesota, United States. Founded by Norwegian settlers in 1891, the school is associated with the Evangelical Lutheran Church in America and is unrelated to the Concordia University System operated by the Lutheran Church – Missouri Synod. Concordia is accredited by the Higher Learning Commission and has a total student enrollment of 1,800. It offers Bachelor of Arts, Bachelor of Music, Bachelor of Science in Nursing, Master of Education, and Master of Science, and Master of Music Education degrees.

Since Concordia was founded, it has articulated a Christian and global curriculum. Students are required to take courses in health, communication, religion, and culture. The college maintains athletic teams in 22 sports and carries 20 music ensembles, including The Concordia Orchestra, The Concordia Band, and The Concordia Choir.

== History ==
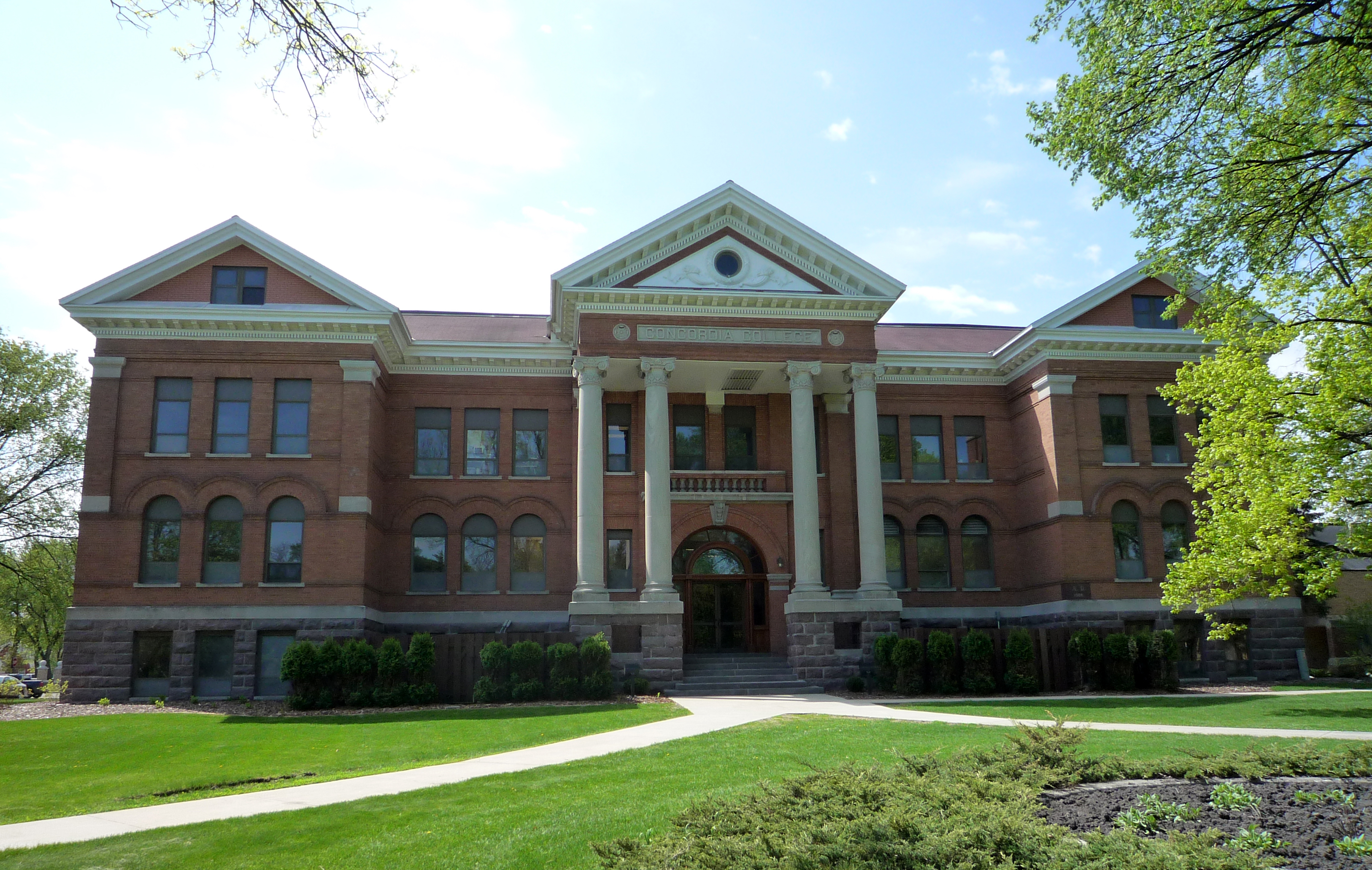
Old Main, constructed in 1906, is listed on the National Register of Historic Places.

Concordia College was dedicated as a private academy on October 31, 1891, by a group of approximately one dozen Norwegian pastors and laymen who had recently settled in the Red River Valley. The school was founded on the property of the former Episcopalian Bishop Whipple School, which had closed in 1887. English professor Ingebrikt Grose of St. Olaf College was asked to preside over the academy, which at that time offered mixed-sex education in English literature, natural sciences, mathematics, piano, and organ. The school opened with three faculty and twelve students.

In 1892, Rasmus Bogstad, a Norwegian pastor, raised funds to build a male dormitory on campus grounds. His efforts led to the construction of Academy Hall. In 1893, Grose resigned and recently hired business professor Hans Aaker took his place. Aaker became mayor of Moorhead in 1900 and left two years later when that job compromised his dedication to the school. Bogstad was appointed Concordia's next president and established its liberal tradition. Under Bogstad, Concordia constructed a new academic building, now called Old Main.

Henry O. Shurson held the presidency after Bogstad resigned in 1910 until Johan A. Aasgaard was appointed in 1911. Under Aasgaard, the nearby Park Region College and Bruflat Academy were merged with Concordia, and a new library was built in what is now called Grose Hall. In 1925, John N. Brown became president and oversaw Concordia's accreditation by the North Central Association in 1927. Eleven years later, a female dormitory was built, named Fjelstad Hall, and in 1947, a male dormitory was built, later called Brown Hall.

Joseph "Prexy Joe" Knutson became president in 1951, and presided over the construction of 16 buildings and the increase in enrollment to 1592 students. Under his leadership, the Concordia Annual Fund, which continues today, was established to raise money for the college's interests. Paul J. Dovre took the presidency in 1975 and oversaw new college programs and articulated Concordia's Lutheran mission. In 1991, Concordia's Speech Team placed 4th in the nation at the AFA-NIET, beating schools with twenty times their enrolment.

In 1999, the college welcomed President Thomas W. Thomsen, who implemented the design for a new campus center; in 2004 Pamela M. Jolicoeur, who established plans for the college's Offutt School of Business, was appointed the first female President. Construction on the Offutt School of Business was completed in late 2012, and hosted students in the fall semester of 2013. William Craft began as president in 2011 and served until June 30, 2023. In 2018, the college's ministry became a member of Reconciling in Christ, affirming its support of LGBTQIA+ people. Today, the college is led by President Colin Irvine.

== Academics ==
Concordia is accredited by the Higher Learning Commission. It enrolls over 1,800 students and offers 61 majors and 12 pre-professional programs. Master of Education degrees are offered, and the most popular majors are business, education, and communication.

The college upholds a curriculum that centers on a Christian and global perspective. Affiliated with the Evangelical Lutheran Church in America, Concordia practices the liberal arts from the Lutheran theological tradition. Faculty are encouraged to retain Becoming Responsibly Engaged in the World (BREW) as a thematic focus in their instructions. The college operates by a semester calendar and first-year students are required to take courses in health, communication, religion, and culture. An honors program is offered for motivated students.

Concordia is included in the Open Doors survey of the top twenty baccalaureate institutions that send students abroad. The college offers four global education programs and offers instruction in nine languages. Moreover, students are permitted to study at two neighboring universities, Minnesota State University Moorhead and North Dakota State University, for course credit to their degrees.

In July 2023, Concordia opened the Heimarck Center, an experiential learning facility for the Sanford Heimarck School of Health Professions.

Concordia is a member of the Metro College Alliance, founded in 2025, which allows students to take classes at other Fargo-Moorhead colleges and universities.

== Student life ==
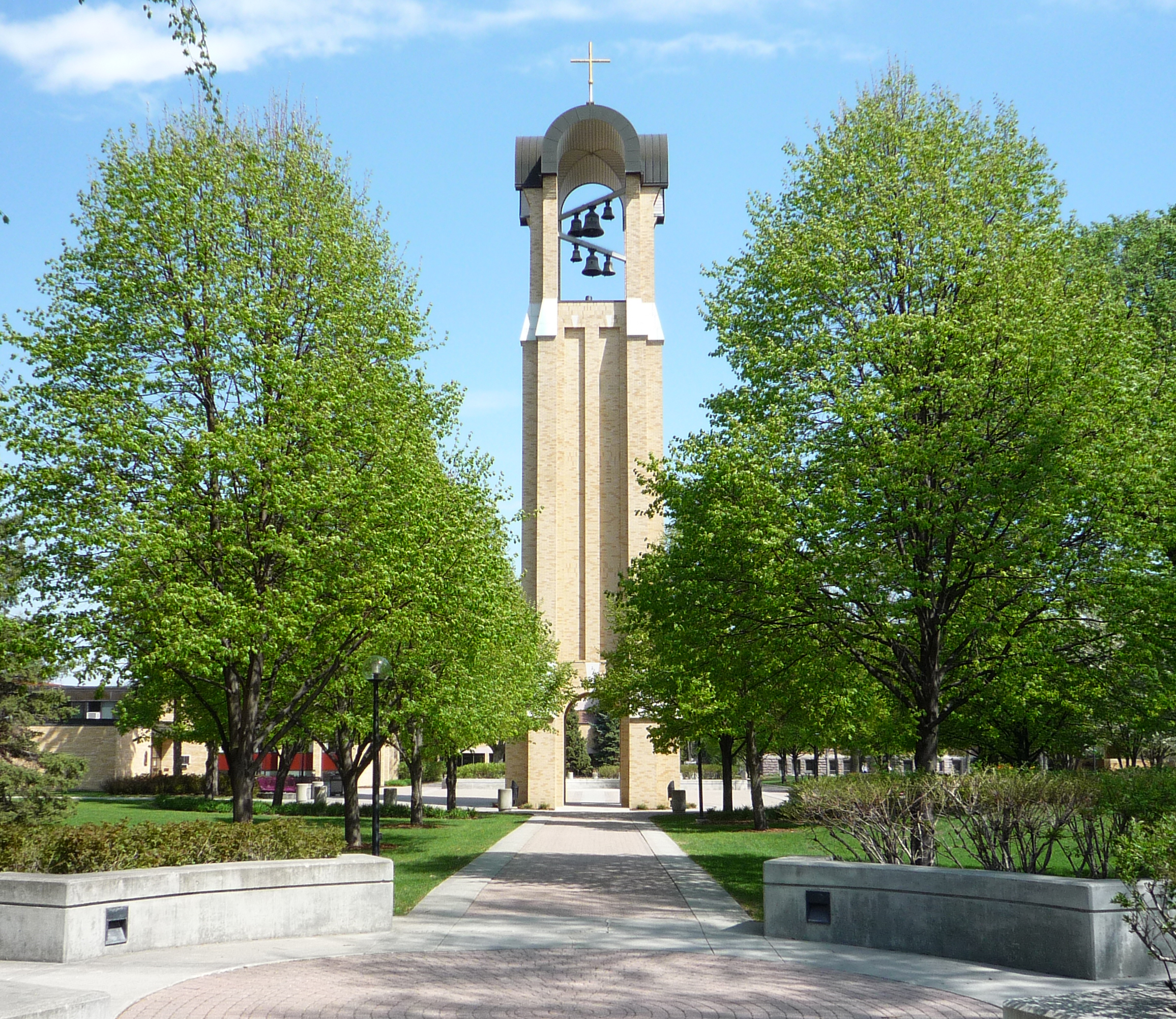
The Dovre Campanile (bell tower) is a campus landmark.

=== Music ===
The college maintains three choirs, four bands, two orchestras, three jazz ensembles, two percussion ensembles, and two handbell choirs. Music education began with the college's 1891 formation, when piano and organ lessons were taught by one instructor. The college has since expanded to include a music department of 45 faculty that offers five Bachelor of Music degrees and two Bachelor of Arts degrees.

The Concordia Choir is a 78-member mixed choir that travels internationally and has performed at major performance venues, including Carnegie Hall and the Kennedy Center. The choir was founded in 1919 by the college's voice instructor and began touring in 1923 under the direction of Herman Monson. The choir grew to national prominence in the following decades when Paul J. Christiansen became the director. Christiansen remained in the position for 49 years until composer René Clausen took over in 1986. Under Clausen, The Concordia Choir has released numerous recordings and has performed with the King's Singers. He was succeeded in 2020 by Michael Culloton.

The college has put on an annual Christmas concert since 1927 that remains a tradition of the local community. From its inception, it has featured the music department's choirs and orchestra. In 1940, Christianson began working with painter Cyrus M. Running to incorporate murals with the concert to reflect the music's themes. Running completed the designs until 1978, when their development was taken over by David J. Hetland, whose murals have traditionally extended 56 by 20 feet (17.1 m × 6.1 m). After Hetland's 2006 death, mural designs were taken over by artist Paul Johnson. The concert is currently performed four times annually on Concordia's campus and twice annually at Orchestra Hall. Over 450 students perform for an audience of twenty thousand, and the concert is broadcast on radio and television. The 2009 concert, Journey to Bethlehem, was recorded by Twin Cities Public Television and won a regional Emmy. It was broadcast nationally by members of the Public Broadcasting Service.

=== Athletics ===
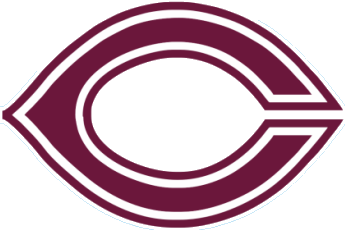
Concordia athletics logo

Concordia–Moorhead athletic teams are the Cobbers. The college is a member of the Division III level of the National Collegiate Athletic Association (NCAA), primarily competing in the Minnesota Intercollegiate Athletic Conference (MIAC) since the 1921–22 academic year.

Concordia–Moorhead competes in 20 intercollegiate varsity sports, in which more than 800 students participate. Men's sports include baseball, basketball, cross country, football, golf, ice hockey, soccer, tennis, track & field, and wrestling; while women's sports include basketball, cross country, golf, ice hockey, soccer, softball, swimming & diving, tennis, track & field, and volleyball.

==== Origins ====
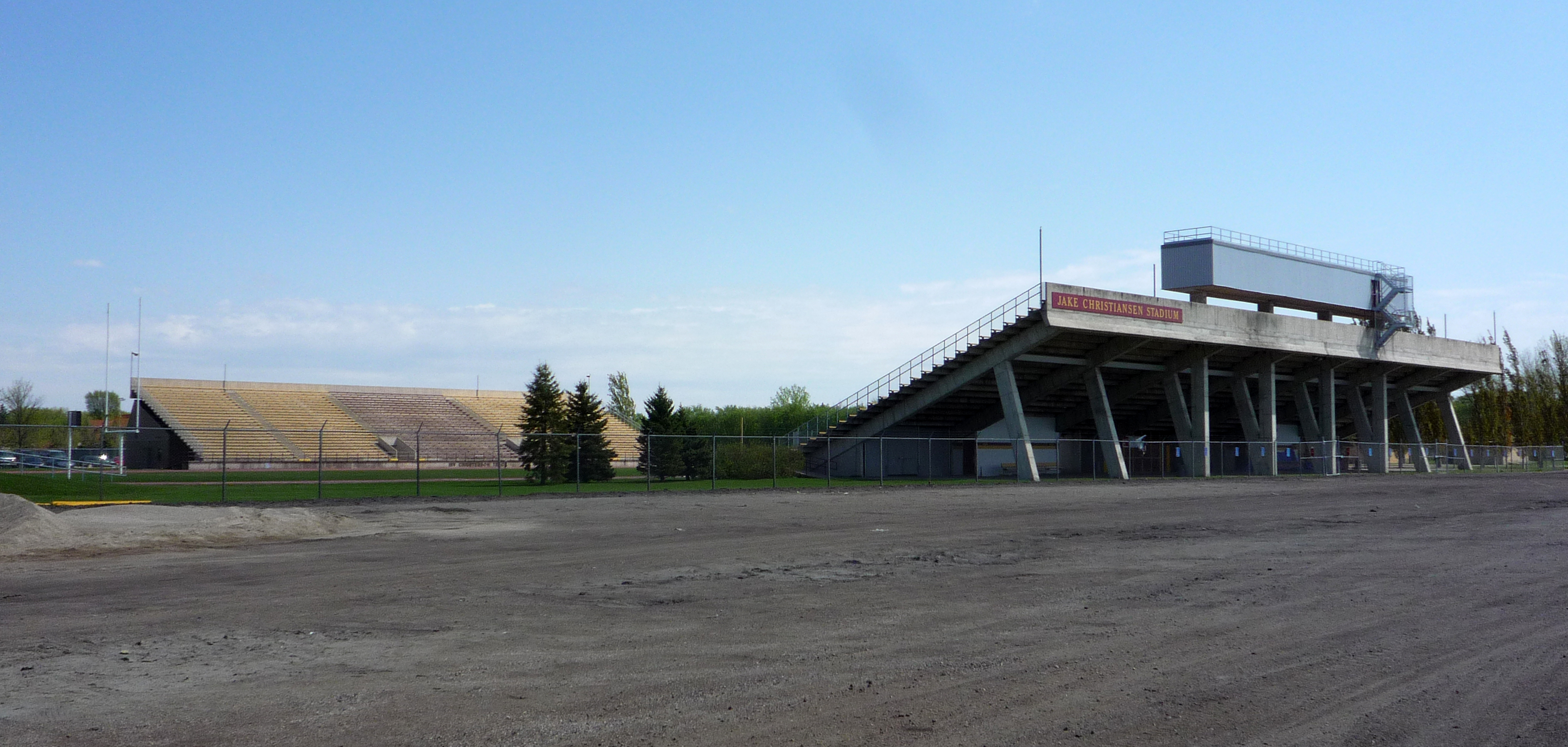
Jake Christiansen Stadium

Athletics began when a baseball club was organized in 1903 and a basketball team was formed after the construction of a gymnasium in 1907. Football emerged in 1916 and Concordia joined the MIAC in 1920. Soon after, teams for tennis, golf, wrestling, softball, volleyball, track, cross country running and others were formed.

Athletics grew further when Jake Christiansen, brother of conductor Paul J. Christiansen, was appointed physical education director in 1941. He coached the football team to five conference championships over his 28-year career. In 1952, Christiansen designed a new athletic facility that promoted the college's reputation in the region. One of Christiansen's former students, Jim Christopherson, took over coaching in 1969 and led the team to nine conference titles and two national championships. Both coaches have been inducted in the College Football Hall of Fame.

The 1982 Concordia–Moorhead women's basketball team defeated Mount Mercy, 73–72, to capture the Cobbers' first AIAW Division III national championship. The Cobbers defeated St. John Fisher in the 1988 NCAA Division III championship game, 65–57, to claim the Cobbers' first NCAA national title.

== Notable faculty ==
Notable faculty include:

- Marcus J. Borg, (1942–2015) American New Testament scholar and theologian, influential in progressive Christianity
- Basit Bilal Koshul, Pakistani researcher writer and editor
- Paul J. Christiansen, (1914–1997) composer and conductor of The Concordia Choir
- René Clausen, Grammy award-winning composer and conductor emeritus of The Concordia Choir
- Chris Coste, head coach, baseball
- Hiram Drache, historian-in-residence
- Rich Glas, athletic director and men's basketball head coach
- Terry Horan, Minnesota Football Coach Association Hall of Fame inductee and Concordia College football coach.
- Jamie Parsley, poet
- Cyrus M. Running, American regionalist painter

== Notable alumni ==
=== Academia ===
- Ephraim Isaac, Ethiopian scholar of ancient Ethiopian Semitic languages and of African and Ethiopian civilizations and among first the first professors of Afro-American studies at Harvard University.
- Leon H. Johnson (March 6, 1908 – June 18, 1969), an American chemist and mathematician who served as President of Montana State University from 1964 to 1969.
- Earl Lewis, National Humanities Medal awardee and professor of history at the University of Michigan.

=== Art ===
- David J. Hetland, artist

=== Business ===
- Marianne C. Brown, businesswoman
- George Halvorson, retired American healthcare executive who served as CEO of Kaiser Permanente.

=== Entertainment ===
- Kam Heskin, former American actress known for her roles in NBC daytime soap opera Sunset Beach, Planet of the Apes, and Catch Me If You Can, and The Prince and Me film franchise.
- Rich Sommer, American actor, best known for his portrayal of Harry Crane on the AMC drama series Mad Men (2007–2015), for which he earned two Screen Actors Guild Awards along with the ensemble cast

=== Government ===
- Glen H. Anderson, former Minnesotan politician who served in the Minnesota House of Representatives from 1973 – 1990.
- Cynthia L. Bauerly, American civil servant who currently serves as the Commissioner of the Minnesota Department of Revenue and was formerly a member of the Federal Election Commission.
- Kevin Cramer, current United States Senator for North Dakota.
- Thomas Hall (June 6, 1869 – December 4, 1958), a former United States politician who served in five terms in the United States House of Representatives representing North Dakota.
- Don Gaetz, former Florida Senate President and father of former Congressman Matt Gaetz
- Gabriel Hauge (March 7, 1914 – July 24, 1981), a prominent American bank executive, economist, academic, director on the Council on Foreign Relations. Hauge served as assistant to the president for economic affairs during the administration of Dwight D. Eisenhower.
- Clint Hill, United States Secret Service agent credited with saving the life of Jacqueline Kennedy during the assassination of John F. Kennedy.
- Daniel Hovland, senior United States district judge of the United States District Court for the District of North Dakota.
- Wilberforce Juta, Former Nigerian politician who served as governor of Gongola State, and later was appointed Nigerian High Commissioner to Zimbabwe.
- Coya Knutson (August 22, 1912 – October 10, 1996), former United States congresswoman who served two terms in the United States House of Representatives representing Minnesota's 9th congressional district.
- Ole H. Olson (September 19, 1872 – January 29, 1954), former Governor of North Dakota.
- Sidney Rand (May 9, 1916 – December 16, 2003), former United States Ambassador to Norway and president of St. Olaf College.
- John R. Tunheim, United States district judge of the United States District Court for the District of Minnesota.

=== Journalism ===
- Alan Bjerga, Journalist, author, lecturer at Georgetown University, and former president of the National Press Club.
- Roxana Saberi, American journalist, CBS News correspondent and former Miss North Dakota pageant winner. In 2009, she was held prisoner in Iran's Evin Prison for 101 days under accusations of espionage.

=== Military ===
- Scrappy Blumer, American pilot in the United States Army Air Forces during World War II credited with five aerial victories in a single action on August 25, 1944, earning him the title of the "Fastest Ace in a Day."
- Michael E. Ennis, former major general in the United States Marine Corps.
- Donald F. Hagen, retired vice admiral in the United States Navy, and Surgeon General of the United States Navy from 1991 to 1995.

=== Music ===
- Karan Armstrong, former American operatic soprano, who won the Metropolitan Opera National Council Auditions in 1966.
- Arlene Buckneberg Ydstie, composer
- Phyllis Byrn-Julson, opera singer
- Phyllis Zimmerman, composer, choral conductor

=== Science ===
- Adolph Murie, first biologist to study wolves in their natural habitat
- Olaf Storaasli, former NASA & Oak Ridge National Laboratory scientist
- Ernest O. Wollan, former American physicist who made major contributions in the fields of neutron scattering and health physics.

=== Sports ===
- Barry Bennett, former defensive lineman for the New Orleans Saints, New York Jets and Minnesota Vikings.
- Jim Christopherson, former linebacker and placekicker for the Minnesota Vikings
- Chris Coste, former Major league baseball catcher and infielder, and 2008 World Series champion.
- Terry Horan, Minnesota Football Coach Association Hall of Fame inductee and Concordia College football coach.
- David Joerger, current head coach of the Sacramento Kings.
- Kris Kuehl, retired track and field athlete who represented the United States in four World Championships and the 2000 Olympic Games.
- Gary Larsen, defensive tackle for the Minnesota Vikings, member of Purple People Eaters.
- Brandon Zylstra, wide receiver for the Detroit Lions.

=== Theology ===
- William F. Beck (August 28, 1904 – October 24, 1966), Lutheran pastor, author of The Holy Bible, An American Translation of the Bible.
- Marcus Borg (March 11, 1942 – January 21, 2015), former American New Testament scholar and theologian. He was among the most widely known and influential voices in Liberal Christianity.
