= David J. Hetland =

David J. Hetland (1947-2006) was a nationally recognized artist from Fargo, ND, known particularly for his liturgical works in mosaic and stained glass.

== Biography ==
Hetland studied under regionalist painter Cyrus M. Running (1913-1976) while a student at Concordia College, Moorhead, Minnesota, graduating in 1969. In 1965 Hetland began working on the Concordia Christmas Concert murals, taking over the role as designer in 1978. The Christmas Concert murals, 56-foot by 20-foot, were painted in each year by volunteers in paint-by-numbers fashion. More than 20,000 people would see the murals at Concordia's Memorial Auditorium and Orchestra Hall in Minneapolis.

Hetland also served as director for Concordia's Office of Communications from 1974 to 1982 and director of special projects since 1982. After dealing with life-threatening illnesses for the last eight years of his life, he died on Easter Sunday, April 16, 2006

== Art ==
One of Hetlands's best-known works was the Jerusalem Cross, commissioned by the Evangelical Lutheran Church in America for presentation to world leaders, including Pope John Paul II. One of his mosaics hangs in the entrance of the ELCA's churchwide offices in Chicago. Hetland also created stained glass windows, altars, pulpits, mosaics, banners and crosses for numerous churches in North Dakota and Minnesota. He designed Concordia's president's medallion in 1980 and a mosaic mural for the library in 1981.

== Awards and honors ==
Hetland received a BENE award in Ministry & Liturgy magazine's national 2003-04 Visual Arts Awards for his design for the 2001 Concordia Christmas Concert Mural. In 2000, he received the Concordia Alumni Achievement award, the highest honor bestowed on alumni, and in 1994 the college presented him with an honorary Doctor of Fine Arts degree.

== Other sources ==
- Froslie, Erin Hemme. "Joy and wonder". The Lutheran. Archived from the original on 2007-09-27.
- "David Hetland, liturgical artist, dies" (Press release). The Lutheran. Archived from the original on 2007-09-27.
- "The murals of David J. Hetland". Minnesota Public Radio.
