= Terry Horan =

American football coach (born c. 1966)

Current position
- Title: Head coach
- Team: Concordia–Moorhead
- Conference: MIAC
- Record: 163–88

Biographical details
- Born: c. 1966 (age 59–60); Willmar, Minnesota, U.S.
- Education: Concordia College (1989)

Playing career
- 1985–1988: Concordia–Moorhead
- Position: Wide receiver

Coaching career (HC unless noted)
- 1989–1990: Concordia–Moorhead (GA)
- 1991–1992: Breckenridge HS (MN) (assistant)
- 1993–1996: Breckenridge HS (MN)
- 1997–1998: Concordia–Moorhead (WR)
- 1999–2000: Breckenridge HS (MN)
- 2001–present: Concordia–Moorhead

Head coaching record
- Overall: 163–88 (college); 56–15 (high school)
- Tournaments: 2–2 (NCAA D-III playoffs)

Accomplishments and honors

Championships
- 1 MIAC (2004)

Awards
- 3× All-MIAC (1986–1988); 2× MIAC Coach of the Year (2002, 2004)

Terry J. Horan (born c. 1966) is an American college football coach. He is the head football coach for Concordia College, a position he has held since 2001. He also was the head football coach for Breckenridge High School from 1993 to 1996 and 1999 to 2000. He played college football for Concordia–Moorhead as a wide receiver.

Horan was inducted into the Minnesota Football Coach Association Hall of Fame in 2021.

== Head coaching record ==
=== College ===
| Year | Team | Overall | Conference | Standing | Bowl/playoffs | D3^{#} |
|---|---|---|---|---|---|---|
Concordia Cobbers (Minnesota Intercollegiate Athletic Conference) (2001–present)
| 2001 | Concordia–Moorhead | 5–5 | 4–5 | T–6th | | |
| 2002 | Concordia–Moorhead | 7–3 | 7–1 | 2nd | | |
| 2003 | Concordia–Moorhead | 7–3 | 6–2 | 3rd | | |
| 2004 | Concordia–Moorhead | 11–1 | 8–0 | 1st | L NCAA Division III Second Round | 9 |
| 2005 | Concordia–Moorhead | 10–2 | 7–1 | 2nd | L NCAA Division III Second Round | 8 |
| 2006 | Concordia–Moorhead | 4–6 | 3–5 | 6th | | |
| 2007 | Concordia–Moorhead | 7–3 | 5–3 | 4th | | |
| 2008 | Concordia–Moorhead | 6–4 | 5–3 | T–2nd | | |
| 2009 | Concordia–Moorhead | 5–5 | 3–5 | T–4th | | |
| 2010 | Concordia–Moorhead | 5–5 | 4–4 | T–4th | | |
| 2011 | Concordia–Moorhead | 6–4 | 4–4 | T–5th | | |
| 2012 | Concordia–Moorhead | 8–2 | 6–2 | T–2nd | | 18 |
| 2013 | Concordia–Moorhead | 8–2 | 6–2 | T–2nd | | |
| 2014 | Concordia–Moorhead | 8–2 | 6–2 | T–2nd | | |
| 2015 | Concordia–Moorhead | 7–3 | 5–3 | T–3rd | | |
| 2016 | Concordia–Moorhead | 7–3 | 6–2 | 3rd | | |
| 2017 | Concordia–Moorhead | 8–2 | 6–2 | 3rd | | 21 |
| 2018 | Concordia–Moorhead | 5–5 | 4–4 | 5th | | |
| 2019 | Concordia–Moorhead | 5–5 | 5–3 | T–4th | | |
| 2020–21 | No team—COVID-19 | | | | | |
| 2021 | Concordia–Moorhead | 4–6 | 3–5 | 2nd (Skyline) | | |
| 2022 | Concordia–Moorhead | 5–5 | 3–5 | T–3rd (Skyline) | | |
| 2023 | Concordia–Moorhead | 5–5 | 4–4 | 2nd (Skyline) | | |
| 2024 | Concordia–Moorhead | 7–3 | 6–2 | 2nd (Skyline) | | |
| 2025 | Concordia–Moorhead | 7–3 | 6–3 | T–3rd | | |
| 2026 | Concordia–Moorhead | 6–1 | 5–1 | | | |
| Concordia–Moorhead: | | 163–88 | 127–73 | | | |
| Total: | | 163–88 | | | | |
National championship Conference title Conference division title or championship game berth
