= Hetland (surname) =

Hetland is a Norwegian surname. There are also people with this surname in North America. People with this surname can often trace their ancestry to an area in Norway called Hetland.

== Notable people ==
- Aleksander Hetland (born 1982), a Norwegian swimmer
- Audun Hetland (1920–1998), a Norwegian illustrator
- David J. Hetland (1947–2006), an American artist from Fargo, North Dakota
- James L. Hetland Jr. (1926–2012), an American politician from Minnesota
- Joseph Ingolph Hetland (1896–1982), a Canadian politician from Saskatchewan
- Katie Hetland, a Norwegian film and television editor and director
- Tom Hetland (born 1954), a Norwegian journalist and editor
- Tor Arne Hetland (born 1974), a professional Norwegian cross-country skier
- Toril Hetland Akerhaugen (born 1982), a Norwegian footballer
