= Marianne C. Brown =

American businesswoman

- Born: 1959 (age 66–67); Brooklyn, New York
- Education: Concordia College (Moorhead, Minnesota)
- Occupations: CEO, COO

Marianne C. Brown (born 1959) is an American businesswoman. Brown has held position of CEO of several companies and is currently the Chief Operating Officer (COO) of SunGard Financial Systems, since February 24, 2014.

== Early life and education ==
Brown was born and raised in Brooklyn, NY. She attended Concordia College (Moorhead, Minnesota), graduating with a BS in business, magna cum laude, in 1997.

== Career ==
ADP (1978 - 2005): In 1978 Brown joined Automatic Data Processing (ADP) as clerk/secretary, and through her career in ADP over next 26 years she held positions of increasing responsibility in various areas.

SIAC (2005 - 2006): She became the CEO of Securities Industry Automation Corporation (SIAC) in 2005 and held that position until 2006.

Omgeo (2006 - 2014): From November 1, 2006 Brown was the president and CEO of Omgeo LLC, a subsidiary of The Depository Trust & Clearing Corporation (DTCC). In February 2014 she stepped down from the post of CEO.

SunGard (2014–present): On February 24, 2014 Brown became the COO of Financial Systems Business at SunGard Data Systems Inc.

== Memberships ==
- Senior Advisor of Pro Mujer, Inc. an international women's development and microfinance organization.
- Member of the board of directors for Careers for People with Disabilities, a non-profit organization dedicated to finding productive employment for individuals with disabilities
- Director of the Brooklyn Bureau of Community Services.
- Director of The Partnership for New York City, Inc.
- Mentor to young women at Marymount College
- A member of the board of directors for the League for the Hard of Hearing
- Advisory council member Center for CIO Leadership and SIFMA's Operations Advisory Board
- Member of The Economic Club of New York

== Awards ==
- FTF News 2011 Technology Innovation Awards "Person of the Year"
- Global Custodian's "Securities Industry Hall of Fame"
- Financial News’ "Top 100 Influential Women in Finance"
- Irish America's "Wall Street 50" 2009
- Irish Voice's "Top 75 Most Influential Women"

== Personal life ==
Brown is a second-generation Irish American: her father's family came from County Fermanagh and her mother's family came from Mayo. She lives in Westchester, New York with her husband and son.
