= Gentle Annie (song) =

Song
- Written: 1856
- Genre: Early American song, Parlour music
- Songwriter(s): Stephen Foster

"Gentle Annie" is a popular American song written by Stephen Foster in 1856. Tradition says that it was written in honor of Annie Jenkins, the daughter of a grocer in Federal Street, Allegheny, Pennsylvania, named Morgan Jenkins. However, Foster's biographer and niece, Evelyn Foster Morneweck, disputes this and states that it is probably written in honor of his cousin, Annie Evans, who died shortly before it was composed. Some sources say it is Foster's farewell to his maternal grandmother, Annie Pratt McGinnis Hart. His paternal grandmother was Ann Barclay.

== Australian version ==
An alternative version from Australia is also known as Gentle Annie. This was published in Australian Tradition, Vol. 1, no. e, in 1964. It was recorded by Martyn Wyndham-Read. The tune is the same as the Stephen Foster version, but the lyrics are different. The Australian lyrics were written by Lame Jack Cousens of Springhurst, Victoria. Sources state that its subject is Annie Waits.

== Adaptations ==
The song "Gentle Annie" sung by Tommy Makem is a different song from both the Foster and the Australian version. Alaska songwriter Britt Arnesen adapted the melody of "Gentle Annie" as a eulogy for the former captain of the F/V Cornelia Marie, Phil Harris, who died from complications of a stroke on February 9, 2010.

Vocalist Heather Berry attributes an adaptation titled "Little Annie" to the Carter Family. The words and the melody are adapted from the original. Composer Phyllis Zimmerman arranged "Gentle Annie" for choir.
