= Cyrus M. Running =

American artist

Cyrus M. Running (August 2, 1913 - December 25, 1976) was an American regionalist painter.

Cyrus Maynard Running was born in Veblen, South Dakota. He was the son of Lutheran minister Alfred Running (1879-1970) and his musician wife, Julia Sophia Olson (1884 - 1935). Cyrus Running graduated from St. Olaf College and the University of Iowa. A student of Grant Wood, he is sometimes considered a regionalist. Much of his art focused on themes common to Minnesota or Norway. He was a member of the faculty of Concordia College in Moorhead, Minnesota, for many years.

== External resources ==
- Cyrus M. Running Gallery at Concordia College
