= National Rahmatul-lil-Alameen Wa Khatam an-Nabiyyin Authority =

Authority in Pakistan

- نیشنل رحمۃ للعالمین اتھارٹی
- Formation: August 12, 2022; 4 years ago
- Founded at: Pakistan
- Fields: Muhammad, Seerah, Islamophobia
- Patron-in-Chief: Prime Minister of Pakistan
- Chairman: Khurshid Ahmad Nadeem
- Director General: Zafar Mahmood Malik
- Director: Suhail BIn Aziz
- Website: nrkna.gov.pk
- Formerly called: National Rahmatul-lil-Alameen Authority

National Rahmatul-lil-Alameen Wa Khatam an-Nabiyyin Authority (Arabic: قومی رحمت اللعالمین و خاتم النبیین اتھارٹی) is an ideological institution of the Government of Pakistan. Set up under the Federal Ministry of Education & Professional Training by the former Prime Minister Imran Khan in October 2021, the first Chairman was Ijaz Akram. The ordinance to set up the authority was promulgated by President Arif Alvi on 13 October 2021. In July 2022, JUI-F former MNA Shahida Akhtar Ali suggest the new name of the authority by adding Khatam an-Nabiyyin, which was endorsed by President of Pakistan, Arif Alvi per suggestion as National Rahmatul-lil-Alameen Wa Khatam an-Nabiyyin Authority formerly National Rahmatul-lil-Alameen Authority.

The authority conducts research on the Seerat un Nabi prophetic biography and hadith to build the character of the nation and particularly of youth. In addition, the authority consults with relevant experts to make the biography of Muhammad a part of the academic curriculum. It has also been tasked with explaining Islam to the world.

== The Authority ==
According to the ordinance issued by the President of Pakistan Arif Alvi, the National Rahmatul Lil Aalameen Authority will consist of a chairman and six members. The chairman of the authority will be appointed by the Prime Minister of Pakistan, who will also be its patron-in-chief. The advisory board of the committee will meet at least once a quarter.

Authority will take steps for justice and welfare state. The authority will conduct research on the prophetic biography and hadiths to build the character of the youth. In addition, the authority will consult with relevant experts to make the biography of Muhammad a part of the curriculum. It will also be tasked with explaining Islam to the world. Its formation was announced while the Prime Minister of Pakistan, Imran Khan, was addressing the Ashra-e-Rehmat-ul-Lil-Aalamin conference in Islamabad. The ordinance to set up the authority was promulgated by President Arif Alvi on 14 October 2021.

The National Rahmatul lil Aalameen Wa Khatamun Nabiyyin Authority has developed Pakistan's first ever Character Education Strategy to cultivate a responsible and inclusive society, drawing inspiration from the teachings and legacy of Muhammad.

=== Patron-in-Chief ===
- Prime Minister of Pakistan

=== Chairman ===
- Anis Ahmad (March 1- July 2023)
- Ejaz Akram (7 December 2021 - February 18, 2022)
- Khurshid Ahmad Nadeem (August 2023 – present)

=== Members of the Advisory Committee ===
- advisory Board list

=== Members of the National Rahmatul-lil-Alameen Authority ===
- Members list

== Criticism and Controversies ==
According to Umair Javed, the purported purpose of the new authority is to get Pakistan out of a selectively portrayed cultural breakdown and moral crisis afflicting all aspects of social life. Javed says Pakistan is far from drifting and is going through regressive conservative revivalism in television segments of religious televangelism to television drama. Javed says that for decades, Pakistan has been in the midst of a large-scale Barelvi and Deobandi revival, with much more violence around the blasphemy law, and associated suppression of minority rights; Quranic study circles and spiritual movements like as Dawat-i-Islami, Tablighi Jamaat and Al Huda are proliferating among the middle class and associated consumption of religious commodities is increasing.

According to Zahid Hussain the new authority established through ordinance by former Prime Minister Imran Khan is an extension of Gen Zia's legacy of deploying religiosity to achieve political gains, with the cover of resetting the system in the name of Islamic faith, the moves are to undermine the freedoms of expression, democratic processes in the country and encourage authoritarianism.

According to the Friday Times, the appointed founder Chairman Ejaz Akram held and promoted controversial views against ethnic civil rights groups like the Pashtun Tahafuz Movement (PTM) and that Akram was critical of the concept of democracy. Hussain says Akram advocates conspiracy theories (espousing that 9/11 was a false flag operation by the US), advocates regional expansionism by Pakistan and his concept of rule by elites of elites fascist. Friday Times says Akram subscribes to conspiracy theories to downplay the COVID-19 pandemic. Akram has written that "Belief in deep secularism, the idea of a republic, nationalism, capitalism, feminism, absolute freedom of speech, are all false consciousness that must be abandoned for things that work for us".

Zahid Hussain says Imran Khan's PTI government has already caused huge damage to education in Pakistan by introducing the Single National Curriculum which would reinforce a closed mindset and additional measures to 'Islamise' the system, which will lead to a further decline in educational standards.

Due to the controversies surrounding the founder Chairman he resigned two months into his formal tenure. In his place, a respected academic, Anis Ahmad (Ph.D. Temple University, USA) currently Vice Chancellor of the private Riphah University and formerly a Vice President of the International Islamic University Islamabad, was appointed as Chairman. He resigned due to personal issues.

At present Khurshid Ahmad Nadeem is the Chairman Authority. He assumed charge on August 8, 2023. Khurshid Ahmad Nadeem is a leading public intellectual, scholar, author, opinion maker and media person. He was awarded ‘Pride of Performance’ in 2016 by the President of Pakistan for his outstanding contribution in the field of literature and journalism. He was member of Council of Islamic Ideology (CII), the constitutional body to advise parliament, federal and provincial governments regarding Islamic aspects of legislation and law making. He authored many books, including ‘Islamic Concept of Crime and Punishment’, ‘Political Islam’, ‘An Alternate Discourse’, ‘Understanding of Islam in Twentieth Century’, ‘Islam and Pakistan’, ’Islam and Climate Change’.

Mr. Nadeem has also been Speech writer to the Prime Minister of Pakistan (1997-1999), Secretary, Commission on Islamization of Education, Government of Pakistan (1999-2005), General Manager (Religious Content) Pakistan Television Corporation. He has been writing regular column in leading Urdu newspapers and hosting talk shows in different TV channels.

Mr. Nadeem was Chairman of Organization for Research and Education (ORE), a nongovernmental organization working since 2003 to sensitize the society about shared values of humanity and religions. He believes that Pakistani society desperately needs an alternate intellectual and religious discourse to address the social problems like religious extremism, intolerance terrorism and violence.

== See also ==
- Council of Islamic Ideology
