= René Clausen =

American composer

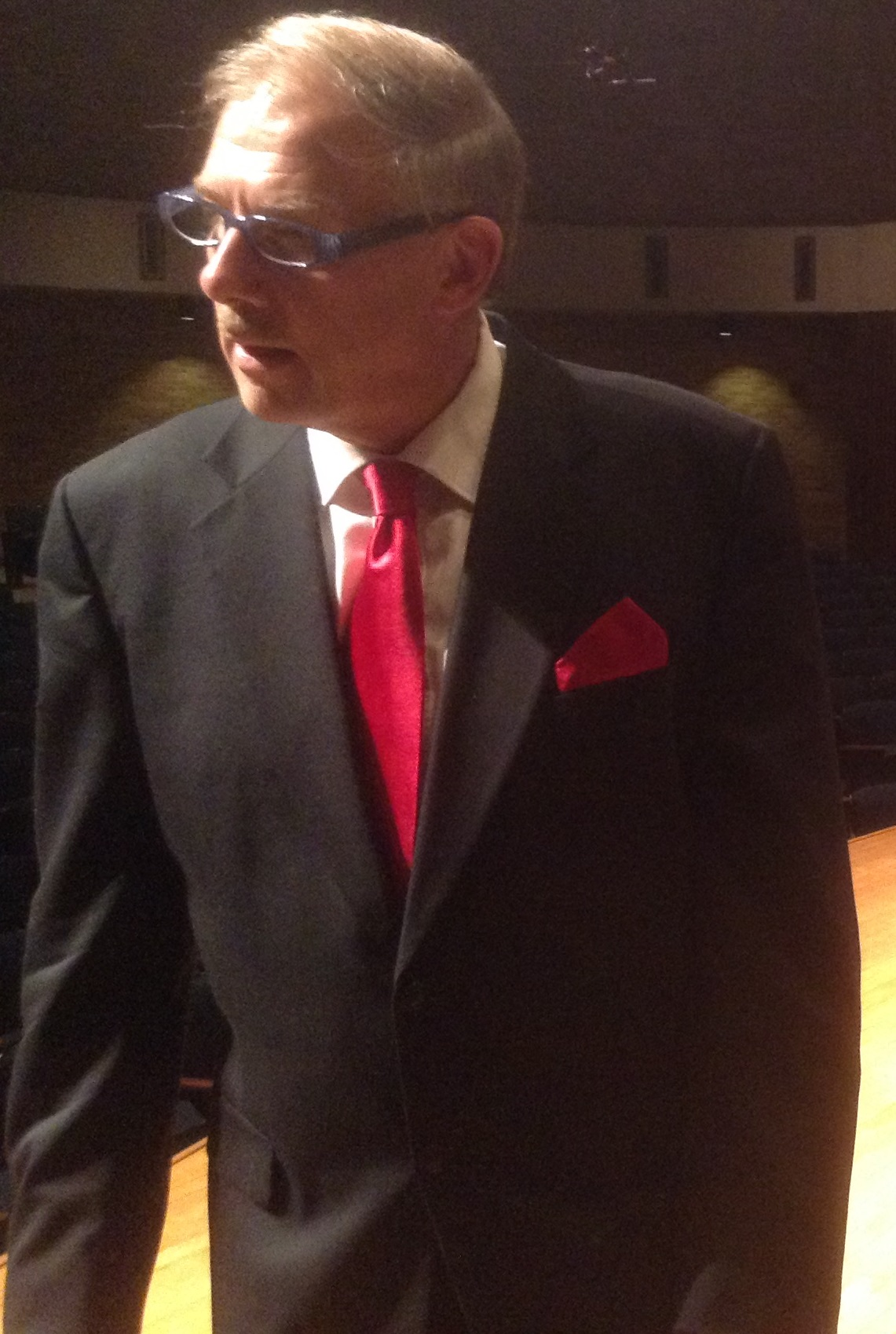
René Clausen signing programs after the Final Concert of a Choral Clinic at the University of Nebraska-Kearney on Monday, October 26th, 2015.

René Clausen (born 1953) is an American composer, conductor emeritus of The Concordia Choir, and former professor of music at Concordia College in Moorhead, Minnesota. Some of his works are widely performed by high school and church choirs, and his more technically demanding pieces have been performed and recorded by college and professional choirs. His recording "Life & Breath: Choral Works by René Clausen" received three Grammy Awards at the 55th Grammy Awards in 2013.

Clausen is a frequent guest conductor, guest composer and lecturer, both nationally and internationally. He has conducted All-State choirs in more than 15 US states. Prior to his appointment as conductor of The Concordia Choir, Clausen was director of choral activities at West Texas State University, Canyon, Texas, and assistant professor of choral music at Wichita State University. He also served as senior editor of Mark Foster Music Company and as interim conductor of the Minneapolis-based National Lutheran Choir.

René Clausen retired as professor of music and conductor of The Concordia Choir following the 2019-20 academic year.

== Early life and education ==
René Clausen was born in Faribault, Minnesota, where his father served as organist for the Evangelical Lutheran Church in America, and moved frequently as a child, also living in Iowa and California, where he was primarily raised. In southern California during his late teenage years he first heard the St. Olaf Choir while it was on tour in the area, a significant formative experience for him. He graduated from Wilton Senior High School in Wilton, Iowa. He holds an undergraduate degree from St. Olaf College, Northfield, Minnesota, and received the Master of Music and Doctor of Musical Arts degrees in choral conducting from the University of Illinois at Urbana-Champaign.

== Some compositions and arrangements ==
Title	Notes
All That Hath Life & Breath Praise the Lord	
A Noiseless, Patient Spider	from Three Whitman Settings
Ave Maria	
Ave Rosa	Commissioned by the St. Olaf Choir, premiered on their winter tour, January–February 2012. The premiere recording is 82:47 into the Winter Home Tour Concert (13 February 2012) archived at https://www.stolaf.edu/multimedia/play/?e=560
Black is the Color of My True Love's Hair	
Deep River	
Hear Me, I Will Live	from Crying for a Dream
How Can You Buy the Sky?	from Crying for a Dream
I Thank You God	A setting of e.e. cummings' celebrated poem "I Thank You God." Dissonance, tone color and texture are ever-changing, chord cluster follows chord cluster and changing meter and tempo further accentuate the unbridled happiness expressed in the text. It has been portrayed as a thanksgiving hymn.
Jabberwocky	
Jubilant Song	
La Lumiere	Translated as "The Light." As the poet's spiritual perception changes, he views his visual landscape in a new light. In much the same way, Clausen transforms the listener's aural landscape with layer upon layer of changing harmony and musical texture. Written for a cappella choir with division in each voice part.
Magnificat	Commissioned by the Texas Choral Director's Association, 1988. Scored for SATB double choir.
Mesabi: "The Sleeping Giant" Symphony	The symphony is performed in 4 movements that takes the audience on a journey through the history of The Mesabi Iron Range: 1) "The Land Awakens" 2) "The Settling Years" 3) "The Mines" 4) "Forging a Way Forward"
O My Luve's Like a Red, Red Rose	
On the Mountain Top Blows the Wind Mild	Silesian folk tune, arr. RC. Scored for SATB divisi.
O Vos Omnes	Texts from the Holy Bible, Sacred Latin Poems, Lutheran Chorale, "O Sacred Head Now Wounded", and the Latin Mass.
Peace I Leave With You	Written for the 1991 Concordia Centennial Alumni Choir, Moorhead, Minnesota. Scored SATB divisi.
Plenty Good Room	Spiritual, arr. RC. Contains jazz elements including a scat soloist (the part is written out in the score)
Prayer	Tribute to Mother Teresa
Psalm 100	Originally for SSA chorus, it is now also available for SATB. Scoring includes Orff instruments and small group of woodwinds.
Psalm 109	
Psalm 148	
Psalm 150	
Quicksand Years	from Three Whitman Settings
The Salutation of the Dawn	The lyrics of this piece were taken from the Sanskrit poem, "The Salutation of the Dawn." It was first performed by Florida All State Chorus in 1997.
Seek the Lord	
Set Me as a Seal	from A New Creation
Song at Dusk	Much like a vocal tone poem, the colors brought forth in this piece, along with the soaring melodies, dramatically illuminate the poem by Leigh Hanes, once poet laureate of the state of Virginia. Divisi in all parts, it is recommended for the advanced high school or college ensemble.
Sweet Was the Song	English carol, arr. RC. Written by Clausen on the occasion of his daughter's(Rachel Clausen) birth. Words traditional, except the second verse by his wife, Frankie Clausen.
The Last Invocation	from Three Whitman Settings
The Lord's Prayer	A contemporary setting of the classic prayer, scored in multiple meters and keys by Clausen. For SATB chorus.
Tonight Eternity Alone	Full of dynamic, expressive passages, soaring soprano solos and simple, but mood-evoking text. A good showcase for moderate-to-advanced skills choir.
War Song	from Crying for a Dream
What a Wonderful World	Clausen provides a most sensitive arrangement of this timeless pop standard.
The Water Is Wide	

=== Santa Barbara Music Publishing ===
Title	Voicing	Santa Barbara Music Publishing Listing
Alleluia	SATB div.	SBMP 557
At the Round Earth's Imagined Corners	TTBB	SBMP 874
Barter	SSA	SBMP 527
Canticle of Praise	SATB / SATB	SBMP 655
Early Bird, The	SSAATTBB	SBMP 645
In the Bleak Midwinter	SATB	SBMP 620
Jabberwocky	SATB	SBMP 528
Make We Joye Now In This Fest	SATB	SBMP 1049
Plenty Good Room	SATB div.	SBMP 536
Psalm 108	SATB	SBMP 543
Song at Dusk	SATB	SBMP 505
Stairs Behind the Sky, The	SATB	SBMP 584
Tant Que Je Vive (Long As I Live)	SATB	SBMP 621
There Is a Balm in Gilead	SATB div; S &/or T s	SBMP 611
There Is No Rose	SATB	SBMP 579
Turn Around	SSA	SBMP 542

Additional music is available from other publishers.

=== Available recordings of compositions ===
Song name	Artist	Recording Title	Format
	Concordia Choir	In The New Moon	1 CD
I. A Noiseless Patient Spider	Concordia Choir	The Choral Music of Rene Clausen	1 CD
I. Hear Me, I Will Live!	Concordia Choir	The Choral Music of Rene Clausen	1 CD
II. Quicksand Years	Concordia Choir	The Choral Music of Rene Clausen	1 CD
II. War Song	Concordia Choir	The Choral Music of Rene Clausen	1 CD
III. How Can You Buy The Sky?	Concordia Choir	The Choral Music of Rene Clausen	1 CD
III. The Last Invocation	Concordia Choir	The Choral Music of Rene Clausen	1 CD
A Jubilant Song	University of Utah Singers	A Jubilant Song	1 CD
A Noiseless Patient Spider	Kantorei	Pillars Of Light	1 CD
A Stable Lamp is Lighted	Kantorei	Little Tree	1 CD
All That Hath Life & Breath	Oasis Chorale	Treasures in Heaven	1 CD
All That Hath Life & Breath Praise Ye the Lord!	Rene Clausen	A Cappella Compositions Vol. 2	Sheet Music
All That Hath Life and Breath	Seattle Children's Chorus	Celebrate!	1 CD
All That Hath Life And Breath	Luther College Norsemen	Oh Sing Jubilee	1 CD
All That Hath Life and Breath, Praise Ye the Lord!	University of Utah Singers	The Cloths of Heaven	1 CD
Ave Maria	Rene Clausen	A Cappella Compositions Vol. 1	Sheet Music
Barter	Manitou Singers of St. Olaf College	Repertoire For Women's Voices Vol 5	1 CD
Calm, on the Listening Ear of Night	Concordia Choir	Come To The Living Water	1 CD
Canticle of Praise	Rene Clausen	A Cappella Compositions Vol. 3	Sheet Music
Canticle Of Praise	Concordia Choir	F. Melius Christiansen 135th Anniversary Concert	2 CDs
Circle Dance	Concordia Choir	Savior of the Nations	1 CD
Come to the Living Water	Concordia Choir	Come To The Living Water	1 CD
Crying For A Dream	Concordia Choir	The Choral Music of Rene Clausen	1 CD
Deep River	Concordia Choir	The Choral Music of Rene Clausen	1 CD
Do You Hear What I Hear?	Concordia Choir	Journey to Bethlehem	DVD
Fantasia O Come, O Come Emmanuel	Concordia Choir	Journey to Bethlehem	1 CD
Fantasia on "The King Shall Come"	Concordia Choir	Savior of the Nations	1 CD
Fantasia on "Une Jeune Pucelle"	Concordia Choir	Come To The Living Water	1 CD
Fantasia On O Come, O Come Emmanuel	Concordia Choir	O Come All Ye Faithful	1 CD
Hosanna	Rene Clausen	A Cappella Compositions Vol. 1	Sheet Music
Hosanna	Luther College Nordic Choir	Christmas with the Nordic Choir Vol 1	1 CD
I Thank You God	Rene Clausen	A Cappella Compositions Vol. 2	Sheet Music
In Pace	Kantorei	Pillars Of Light	1 CD
La Lumiere	Rene Clausen	A Cappella Compositions Vol. 2	Sheet Music
La Lumiere	Concordia Choir	Echoes	1 CD
Laudate	Luther College Nordic Choir	Everlasting God	1 CD
Lord of All Being	Concordia Choir	Star Of Wonder	1 CD
Magnificat	Rene Clausen	A Cappella Compositions Vol. 2	Sheet Music
Magnificat	Concordia Choir	The Choral Music of Rene Clausen	1 CD
Magnificat	National Lutheran Choir	While Angels Sing	1 CD
Make A Joyful Noise	Manitou Singers of St. Olaf College	Christmas	1 CD
Make A Joyful Noise	Manitou Singers of St. Olaf College	Highlights from the St. Olaf Christmas Festival	1 CD
Make A Joyful Noise	St. Olaf Choir	What Wondrous Love Vol V1	1 CD
Memorial	Concordia Choir	Memorial	1 CD
Messe Pour Double Choeur	Phoenix Bach Choir	Eternal Rest	SACD
Nunc Dimittis	Various Arrangers	Augsburg Choirbook for Advent, Christmas and Epiphany	Songbook
Nunc Dimittis	St. Olaf Choir	Where Peace and Love and Hope Abide	2 CDs
O Little Town of Bethlehem	Concordia Choir	Journey to Bethlehem	1 CD
O My Luve's Like a Red, Red Rose	Seattle Children's Chorus	A Young Poet Sings	1 CD
O My Luve's Like a Red, Red Rose	St. Olaf Choir	Repertoire for Mixed Voices Vol. 1	1 CD
O My Luves Like a Red, Red Rose	St. Louis Children's Choir	30th Anniversary	2 CDs
O Vos Omnes	Kantorei	Pillars Of Light	1 CD
O Vos Omnes	Concordia Choir	The Choral Music of Rene Clausen	1 CD
Peace I Leave With You	Rene Clausen	A Cappella Compositions Vol. 1	Sheet Music
Peace I Leave with You	Millikin University Choirs	From The Heart	1 CD
Peace I Love With You	National Lutheran Choir	Tree of Glory	1 CD
Prayer	Coro Nacional de Cuba	El Canto Quiere ser Luz - Songs Want to Be Light	1 CD
Psalm 100	St. Louis Children's Choir	30th Anniversary	2 CDs
Psalm 100	Bella Voce Young Women's Choir	Best of Bella	1 CD
Psalm 100	New Orleans Children's Chorus	Music Down In My Soul	2 CDs
Psalm 100	Manitou Singers of St. Olaf College	The Choral Music of Rene Clausen	1 CD
Psalm 100: Make A Joyful Noise	St. Olaf Choir	Light of All Creation ... Scatter the Darkness	2 CDs
Psalm 103	Concordia Choir	Star Of Wonder	1 CD
Psalm 23	Concordia Choir	The Lord Is My Shepherd	1 CD
Quicksand Years	Iowa State Singers	Choral Spectrum 1	1 CD
Quicksand Years	Kantorei	Pillars Of Light	1 CD
Seek The Lord	Concordia Choir	The Choral Music of Rene Clausen	1 CD
Seek The Lord	Millikin University Choirs	Vespers 2010 - Shout The Good News	1 CD
Set Me As A Seal	Rene Clausen	A Cappella Compositions Vol. 1	Sheet Music
Set Me As A Seal	Grand Rapids Women's Chorus	Celebrating Time Together	1 CD
Set Me As A Seal	Millikin University Choirs	From The Heart	1 CD
Set Me As a Seal	St. Olaf Choir	Hallelujah! We Sing Your Praises	1 CD
Set Me As A Seal	Mirinesse	Sing Creation's Music	1 CD
Set Me As A Seal	St. Louis Children's Choir	Spring Concerts 2004	1 CD
Set Me As A Seal	The Dale Warland Singers	The Choral Music of Rene Clausen	1 CD
Set Me as a Seal	University of Utah Singers	The Cloths of Heaven	1 CD
Sua Gan	Concordia Choir	Savior of the Nations	1 CD
The Last Invocation	Kantorei	Pillars Of Light	1 CD
There is No Rose	Luther College Nordic Choir	Christmas at Luther 2009	1 CD
There Is No Rose	Concordia Choir	O Come All Ye Faithful	1 CD
There Is No Rose of Such Virtue	Concordia Choir	Journey to Bethlehem	1 CD
There Is No Rose of Such Virtue	Concordia Choir	Journey to Bethlehem	DVD
Three Whitman Settings	Concordia Choir	The Choral Music of Rene Clausen	1 CD
Three Whitman Settings (from "Leaves of Grass"):	Kantorei	Pillars Of Light	1 CD
Tonight Eternity Alone	Rene Clausen	A Cappella Compositions Vol. 1	Sheet Music
Tonight eternity alone	Choir of Trinity College, Cambridge	Beyond All Mortal Dreams	1 CD
Tonight Eternity Alone	University of Utah Singers	I Thank You God for Most This Amazing Day	1 CD
Tonight eternity alone	The Choral Project	Water and Light	1 CD
Tonight, Eternity Alone	Concordia Choir	The Choral Music of Rene Clausen	1 CD
Ubi Caritas	Concordia Choir	Echoes	1 CD
Ubi caritas	BYU Singers	My Redeemer Lives	1 CD
Ubi Caritas	Gloria Chorale - Jungpyo Hong director (Korea)	O Crux	1 CD
Veni	Kantorei	Pillars Of Light	1 CD
Watchman, Tell Us Of The Night	Concordia Choir	O Come All Ye Faithful	1 CD
Watchman, Tell Us of the Night	Concordia Choir	Star Of Wonder	1 CD

== Discography ==
NOTE: Clausen's compositions and arrangements are published by Shawnee Press in the Mark Foster Catalog, Santa Barbara Music Publishing, Roger Dean Publishing Company and Augsburg Publishing House.

A New Creation

Recorded in 1990 by the Dale Warland Singers, conducted by the composer, this sacred cantata uses both English and Latin texts. "Set Me as a Seal," one of the last movements, has been widely performed on its own.

The Choral Music of René Clausen

Memorial

Memorial was written for the 2003 Brock Commission from the American Choral Directors Association. It is a composition for mixed chorus, orchestra and baritone solo, based on subject material, which reflects the horrific events of September 11, 2001, in New York City. Though presented as one continuous movement, the composition follows a program that consists of four sub-sections - September Morning, The Premonition, The Attack, and Prayers & Petitions. The baritone soloist is Peter Halverson (a Concordia College Music Faculty member), the soprano soloist is opera singer (then student) Molly Mustonen. On this CD, there is also an exceptional performance of Samuel Barber's instrumental piece, "Adagio for Strings", performed by the Concordia College Orchestra.

== See also ==
- The Concordia Choir
