= Katie Hetland =

Norwegian film, television and music video director

- Born: Sandnes, Norway
- Occupations: Film director; Film editor
- Years active: 1994 - present
- Awards: Primetime Emmy 2011 Outstanding Picture Editing for a Special Lady Gaga Presents the Monster Ball Tour: At Madison Square Garden

Katie Hetland is a Norwegian film and television editor and director. In 2011 she won an Emmy Award for best editing for Lady Gaga Presents the Monster Ball Tour: At Madison Square Garden.

== Biography ==
Hetland won Norway's Children Film Festival Amandus with short films in 2001 and 2002 when she was a teenager. In 2004, a short film about her mother's fight with lymphoma, Mommy is an Angel, won a film festival hosted by the School of Visual Arts in New York City and she was offered a scholarship.

As part of the research for writing her graduating thesis Traveling in Circles Hetland worked as a flight attendant. The film was shot on board an A321 aircraft and on location on Sola Airport, Stavanger with her flight attendant colleagues being part of the film crew. Traveling in Circles later won 'Vestlandsprisen' in Stavanger, 'SVA Dusty's Film Festival' in New York City and LA Mosaic in Hollywood.

After moving to Los Angeles, Hetland started working with music videos. She has worked with fellow Norwegian director Ray Kay. Before he died Hetland was working on a visual album with Prince.

In 2019 Hetland edited Norway's first Netflix Original Home for Christmas. Two years later she again worked with director Per Olav Sørensen on the Netflix mini series about the birth of Spotify The Playlist. In 2022 she won 'Best Editing' for Erik Almås debut short film It's Probably Me. She wrote and edited Norway's Purk for Tv2. The series reached record viewership for the network. She is currently developing a series based on Pål Enger and his heist of the Edvard Munch painting The Scream.

Hetland is the first Norwegian female to receive a Primetime Emmy

== Selected filmography ==
- 2019: Home for Christmas, Netflix - editor
- 2011: Lady Gaga Presents the Monster Ball Tour: At Madison Square Garden, HBO – editor
- 2007: Travelling in Circles - director
