= Ivy Heitland =

English painter

- Born: 1875; England
- Died: 1895 (aged 19–20)

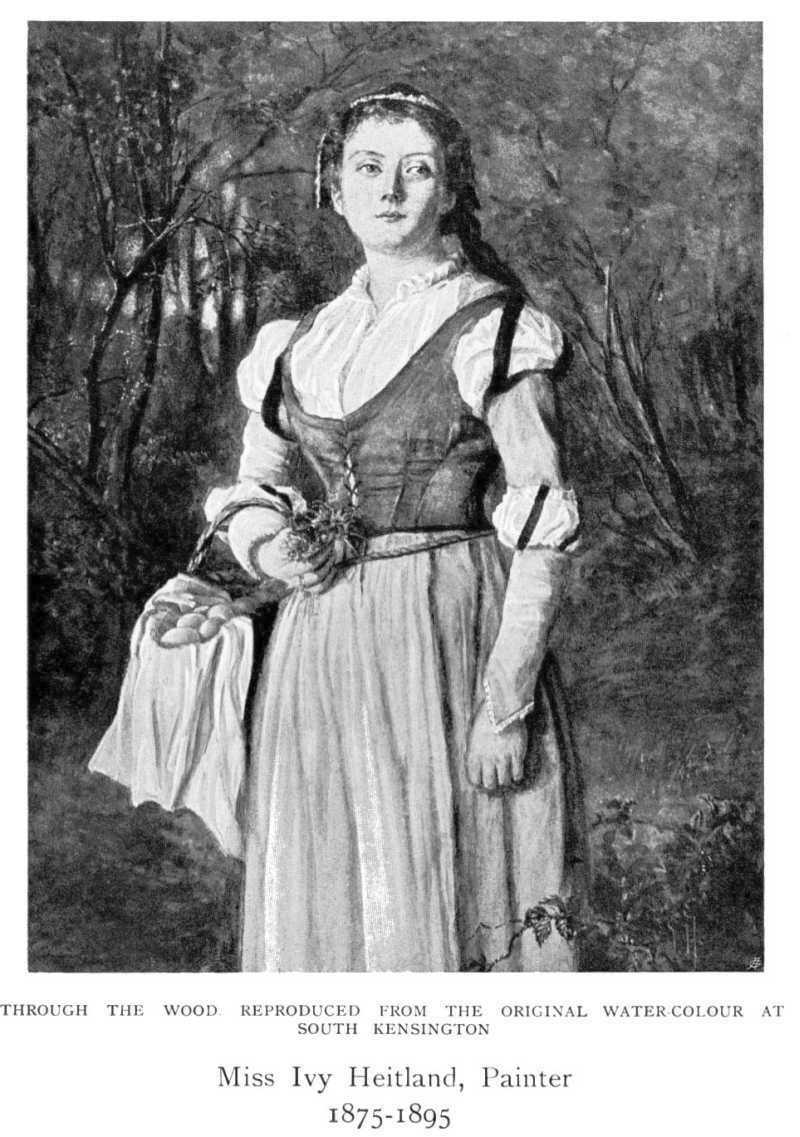
Through the Wood

Ivy Heitland (1875–1895) was an English painter who died young.

She was raised by a family of artists, with her promising career cut short due to her death at the age 19. Heitland was born and trained in England and her work Through the Wood was included in the book Women Painters of the World.
