= The Concordia Choir =

American collegiate choir

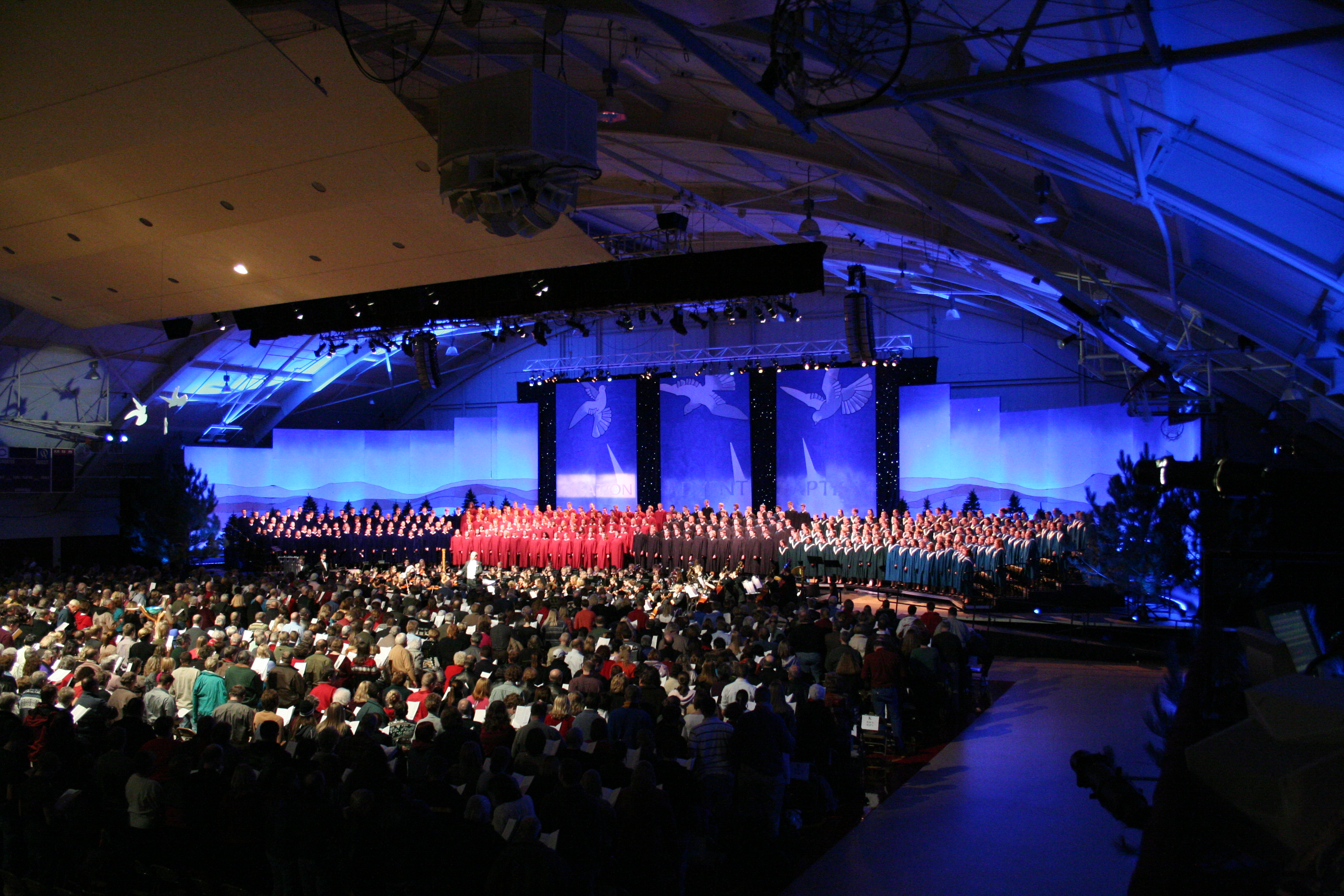
- The Concordia Choir performing during the annual Christmas Concert

Background information
- Origin: Moorhead, Minnesota, United States
- Genre: Choral music
- Years active: 1920–present
- Website: www.theconcordiachoir.org

The Concordia Choir is an elite collegiate choral ensemble from Concordia College in Moorhead, Minnesota. Founded in 1920, the choir is composed primarily of undergraduate students and has been involved in regional, national, and international choral performances. The ensemble performs both sacred and secular repertoire and participates in annual tours and seasonal concert programs.

== History ==
The choir was founded at Concordia College in 1920. From 1937 to 1986, it was directed by Paul J. Christiansen, a figure associated with the continuation of choral traditions developed by his father, F. Melius Christiansen, at St. Olaf College. The Christiansen family's influence is frequently cited in discussions of Minnesota’s choral development during the 20th century.

René Clausen directed the choir from 1986 to 2020. During his tenure, the choir undertook national and international tours and produced numerous recordings. Clausen’s compositional style and educational methods have been discussed in publications by the American Choral Directors Association.

In 2020, Dr. Michael Culloton, a Concordia alumnus, became the ensemble’s fourth conductor.

== Tours and performances ==
The choir conducts annual tours across the United States and international tours on a rotating schedule. Past destinations have included Germany and Italy, with performances in both liturgical and concert settings.

In March 2024, the choir was reviewed in The Munro Review following a tour concert in California. The performance was noted for its program variety and ensemble coordination.

== Recordings and broadcasts ==
The ensemble produces recordings through the Concordia Recordings label. A 2016 concert was broadcast on Minnesota Public Radio’s *Choral Stream*, including works by Bach, Stephen Paulus, and René Clausen.

== Christmas concert ==
The choir participates annually in Concordia College’s Christmas Concerts, which also feature the college's orchestra and other vocal ensembles. These performances are held in Moorhead and Minneapolis and have been broadcast on public television stations. The concerts have received regional recognition, including Upper Midwest Emmy Awards for televised productions.

== Academic relevance ==
The choir’s former conductor René Clausen has been the subject of academic study, particularly in relation to his choral composition and conducting pedagogy.

== Discography ==
''Folk Songs, Spirituals, and Hymns'' (René Clausen, conductor)

- Released: 1994, 2000
- Format: Cassette, CD
- Label: Concordia Recordings
- Producer: Gordon Moe
- Tracks: Las Agachadas (The Shakedown Song) (Aaron Copland) (3:10) / This Little Light of Mine (3:11) / Shenandoah (4:27) / Hark, I Hear The Harps Eternal (2:00) / I Got Shoes (2:51) / All My Trials (3:07) / John Saw Duh Numbuh (2:11) / Set Down, Servant (2:43) / Abide with me (William Henry Monk) (2:49) / Lamb of God, Most Holy (Nikolaus Decius) (2:00) / Lost in the Night (F. Melius Christiansen (4:03) / Wachet auf, ruft uns die Stimme (Philipp Nicolai) (3:44) / Den signede dag (The Blessed Day) (Christoph Ernst Friedrich Weyse) (3:48) / Beautiful Savior (3:53)

''The Choral Music of Réne Clausen, Volume I'' (Performed by The Concordia Choir, the Dale Warland Singers, and the Manitou Singers of St. Olaf College)

- Released: October 15, 1996
- Format: CD
- Label: Concordia Recordings
- Producer: Gordon Moe
- Tracks: Crying for a Dream: I. Hear Me, I Will Live! (5:32) / II. War Song (8:59) / III. How Can You Buy The Sky? (9:14) // Three Whitman Settings: I. A Noiseless Patient Spider (3:38) / II. Quicksand Years (1:56) / III. The Last Invocation (3:03) // Tonight, Eternity Alone (3:47) / Magnificat (6:52) / Deep River (2:51) / O Vos Omnes (8:47) / Seek The Lord (6:04) / Set Me As A Seal (3:00) / Psalm 100 (3:05)

''In the New Moon'' (René Clausen, conductor)

- Released: June 23, 1998
- Format: CD
- Label: Concordia Recordings
- Tracks: Exultate Deo, motet for solemn occasions, for chorus, FP 109 (Francis Poulenc) (3:04) / Agnus Dei, for chorus (Krzysztof Penderecki) (6:59) / Agnus Dei (Sven-David Sandström) (4:39) / Sanctus (Frank Martin) (5:11) / O Tod, wie bitter bist du (Oh death, how bitter is the remembrance), motet for 5 voices, Op. 110/3 (Max Reger) (9:27) / Singet dem Herrn ein neues Lied, Op. 12/1, for chorus (Hugo Distler) (5:29) / Totus Tuus, for chorus, Op. 60 (Henryk Górecki) (10:00) / Song for Athene, for chorus (John Tavener) (6:44) / In Pace (René Clausen) (8:10)

''My Soul's Delight'' (René Clausen, conductor)

- Released: 1998
- Format: CD
- Label: Concordia Recordings
- Producer: Gordon Moe, Michael Culloton
- Tracks: My Song In The Night (arr. Paul J. Christiansen) (6:26) / Create In Me A Clean Heart (arr. Paul J. Christiansen) (1:44) / Oh, Yes! (arr. Carol E. Barnett) (3:37) / Joshua Fit the Battle of Jericho (arr. Edwin Fissinger (3:29) / Ain't Got Time To Die (Hall Johnson) (2:32) / Little Potato (arr. Carol E. Barnett) (3:34) / Sourwood Mountain (arr. John Rutter) (1:50) / Black Sheep (arr. John Rutter) (2:42) / The Best Of Rooms (Randall Thompson) (4:06) / Past Life Melodies (Sarah Hopkins) (5:27) / Noel Ayisyen (Emile Desamours) (2:26) / Witness (arr. Jack Halloran) (2:54) / Pilgrim's Chorus (arr. Paul J. Christiansen) (4:03) / Praise To The Lord (arr. F. Melius Christiansen) (3:53) / Softly And Tenderly (arr. René Clausen) (2:30)

''Your Heart Shall Rejoice'' (René Clausen, conductor.)

- Released: 2002
- Format: CD
- Label: Concordia Recordings
- Producer: René Clausen, Ted Horan, and Katie Pence
- Tracks: Jubilate Deo (Giovanni Gabrieli) (4:14) / I Will Not Leave You Comfortless, for chorus (after William Byrd) (Everett Titcomb) (1:27) / Sing Joyfully, anthem for 6 voices (SSAATB) (William Byrd) (2:40) / Singet dem Herrn ein neues Lied, for chorus & continuo, SWV 196 (Op. 5/73, Op. 14/100) (Heinrich Schütz) (5:34) / Selig sind die Toten, motet for 2 sopranos, alto, 2 tenors, bass & continuo, SWV 391 (Op. 11/23) (Heinrich Schütz) (4:10) / Ich bin die Auferstehung und das Leben, for double chorus, SWV 464 (Heinrich Schütz) (3:03) / Komm, Jesu, komm, motet for chorus & continuo, BWV 229 (BC C3) (Johann Sebastian Bach) (9:01) / Der Geist hilft unser Schwachheit auf, motet for double chorus, winds, strings & continuo, BWV 226 (BC C2) (Johann Sebastian Bach) (8:45) / Lobet den Herrn, alle Heiden, motet for chorus & organ, BWV 230 (BC C6) (Johann Sebastian Bach) (6:50)

''Endless Your Grace: Folk Songs, Spirituals, And Hymns, Vol. 2''

- Released: October 18, 2005
- Format: CD
- Label: Concordia Recordings
- Tracks: Ezekiel Saw de Wheel (2:55) / What a Wonderful World (Bob Thiele, George David Weiss) (5:33) / Come and Taste (2:19) / His Voice (4:15) / Black Is the Color of My True Love's Hair (5:19) / Daniel, Daniel, Servant of the Lord (2:22) / Gracious Spirit (2:45) / This Little Light (4:02) / There Is a Balm in Gilead (6:21) / Ain't Got Time to Die (Hall Johnson) (2:32) / Pilgrims' Hymn (Stephen Paulus) (4:12) / Wondrous Love (3:48) / Didn't My Lord Deliver Daniel? (2:46) / Give Me Jesus (4:49) / My God, How Wonderful Thou Art (3:32) / Beautiful Savior (4:05)

''High Flight: Choral Music by Whitacre, Lauridsen, Chilcott'' (Performed by The King's Singers and The Concordia Choir (René Clausen, conductor))

- Released: 2011
- Format: CD
- Label: Signum Classics
- Producer: Steve Barnett, René Clausen, Ted Horan, and Adrian Peacock
- Tracks: Oculi Omnium (Bob Chilcott) (2:23) / O Nata Lux (Morten Lauridsen) (4:11) / Lux Aurumque (Eric Whitacre) (3:42) / Even such is time (Chilcott): I. Anyone lived in a pretty how town (3:38) / 2. A flower given to my daughter (2:34) / 3. Days (1:55) / 4. Even such is time (2:53) / Cloudburst (Whitacre) (7:47) / High Flight (Chilcott) (5:48) / This Marriage (Whitacre) (2:45) / O Magnum Mysterium (Lauridsen) (6:33) / Alone (Whitacre) (3:32) / This Stolen Child (Whitacre) (8:49) / A Thanksgiving (Chilcott) (3:32)
