= Hetland, South Dakota =

- Town
- Location in Kingsbury County and the state of South Dakota
- Coordinates: 44°22′36″N 97°14′05″W
- Country: United States
- State: South Dakota
- County: Kingsbury
- Founded: 1880

Area
  - Total: 0.12 sq mi (0.30 km^{2})
  - Land: 0.12 sq mi (0.30 km^{2})
  - Water: 0 sq mi (0.00 km^{2})
- Elevation: 1,732 ft (528 m)

Population (2020)
  - Total: 20
  - Density: 175.0/sq mi (67.56/km^{2})
- Time zone: UTC-6 (Central (CST))
  - Summer (DST): UTC-5 (CDT)
- ZIP codes: 57212, 57244
- Area code: 605
- FIPS code: 46-28460
- GNIS feature ID: 1267421

Hetland is a town in Kingsbury County, South Dakota, United States. As of the 2020 census, Hetland had a population of 20.

== History ==
A post office called Hetland was established in 1888, and remained in operation until it was discontinued in 1997. The town was named for John Hetland, a pioneer settler who was murdered while traveling from Sioux Falls to his homestead near the present site of Hetland.

== Geography ==
According to the United States Census Bureau, the town has a total area of 0.11 square miles (0.28 km^{2}), all land.

== Demographics ==
Historical population
Census	Pop.	Note	%±
1900	162		—
1910	223		37.7%
1920	248		11.2%
1930	250		0.8%
1940	199		−20.4%
1950	123		−38.2%
1960	107		−13.0%
1970	81		−24.3%
1980	66		−18.5%
1990	53		−19.7%
2000	43		−18.9%
2010	46		7.0%
2020	20		−56.5%
U.S. Decennial Census

=== 2010 census ===
As of the census of 2010, there were 46 people, 17 households, and 11 families residing in the town. The population density was 418.2 inhabitants per square mile (161.5/km^{2}). There were 24 housing units at an average density of 218.2 per square mile (84.2/km^{2}). The racial makeup of the town was 100.0% White.

There were 17 households, of which 23.5% had children under the age of 18 living with them, 41.2% were married couples living together, 11.8% had a female householder with no husband present, 11.8% had a male householder with no wife present, and 35.3% were non-families. 17.6% of all households were made up of individuals, and 5.9% had someone living alone who was 65 years of age or older. The average household size was 2.71 and the average family size was 2.91.

The median age in the town was 35 years. 34.8% of residents were under the age of 18; 4.3% were between the ages of 18 and 24; 19.5% were from 25 to 44; 30.4% were from 45 to 64; and 10.9% were 65 years of age or older. The gender makeup of the town was 56.5% male and 43.5% female.

=== 2000 census ===
As of the census of 2000, there were 43 people, 18 households, and 10 families residing in the town. The population density was 374.7 inhabitants per square mile (144.7/km^{2}). There were 21 housing units at an average density of 183.0 per square mile (70.7/km^{2}). The racial makeup of the town was 100.00% White.

There were 18 households, out of which 27.8% had children under the age of 18 living with them, 44.4% were married couples living together, 11.1% had a female householder with no husband present, and 44.4% were non-families. 38.9% of all households were made up of individuals, and 16.7% had someone living alone who was 65 years of age or older. The average household size was 2.39 and the average family size was 3.30.

In the town, the population was spread out, with 27.9% under the age of 18, 20.9% from 18 to 24, 23.3% from 25 to 44, 16.3% from 45 to 64, and 11.6% who were 65 years of age or older. The median age was 28 years. For every 100 females, there were 104.8 males. For every 100 females age 18 and over, there were 106.7 males.

The median income for a household in the town was $32,500, and the median income for a family was $32,813. Males had a median income of $21,667 versus $13,750 for females. The per capita income for the town was $9,239. None of the population or families were below the poverty line.
