= Paul J. Christiansen =

American conductor (1914–1997)

Paul Joseph Christiansen (July 31, 1914 – December 5, 1997) was an American choral conductor and composer. As the youngest son of F. Melius Christiansen, he was brought up into the Lutheran Choral Tradition and quickly developed his own style of conducting and composing that furthered the tradition started by his father. He spent the bulk of his career developing The Concordia Choir and conducted the choir from 1937-1986. He is also credited with establishing the Concordia Christmas Concert which is seen yearly by more than 30,000 people.

Paul J. Christiansen died December 5, 1997, at his Moorhead, Minnesota home, of amyotrophic lateral sclerosis (AML Lou Gehrig's disease). He was 83 years old at the time of his death.

== Selected compositions and arrangements ==
- Gracious Spirit
- This Little Light
- Pilgrim's Chorus
- Wondrous Love
- Lift Up Your Heads
- Brothers
- My Song in the Night
- The King of Love
- Prayers of Steel
- Christmas Procession
- Vidi Aquam
- And God Shall
- Create in Me a Clean Heart O God
- Jesus, Jesus Rest Your Head
- Now All Poor
- Tree of Glory
- While Angels Sing
- Kyrie Eleison
- This is My Father's World
- Easter Carol
- Winds Through The Olive Trees
- Cindy
- Swing Low, Sweet Chariot
- The Last Spring
- Mary Sat Spinning
- "David's Prayer (from Psalm 39)"
