= List of presidents of the University of Virginia =

In Thomas Jefferson's original plan the faculty, counseled by a Board of Visitors, governed the university. By the turn of the century, the school had grown larger and more complex, and the Visitors saw the need to appoint a president. When Woodrow Wilson, a University of Virginia law graduate yet to be president, declined the offer, they turned to Edwin Anderson Alderman, well known as an innovative educator in the South and a great orator across the nation. Alderman was inaugurated on Founder's Day, April 13, 1905. Within a year, Alderman had seen to the opening of a school of education at the university.

Prior to 1904, the administrative head of the University of Virginia was the chairman of the faculty. According to the 1900 publication of The University of Virginia: Glimpses of its past and present, "The University of Virginia is an ideal community. It has been described as a small republic, finding in itself all that is necessary in the way of government and the pursuit of happiness. It is democratic as far as its government goes, since the powers of control are distributed as far as possible. There is no president, but there is a chairman of the faculty who stands in somewhat the relation of other college presidents to the responsibilities of control and direction. He is not as nearly absolute as a college president. The faculty is his cabinet, and the faculty committees distribute the administration in a rather general way."

== List of UVA leaders ==
The following persons have led the University of Virginia from 1825 to 1903 as chairman of the faculty and since 1904 as president:

No.	Image	Leader	Term start	Term end	Ref.
Chairman of the Faculty of the University of Virginia (1825–1904)
1a		George Tucker	1825	1826	
2a		Robley Dunglison	1826	1827	
3		John Tayloe Lomax	1827	1828	
2b		Robley Dunglison	1828	1830	
4		Robert Maskell Patterson	1830	1832	
1b		George Tucker	1832	1833	
5		Charles Bonnycastle	1833	1835	
6a		John A. G. Davis	1835	1837	
7a		Gessner Harrison	1837	1839	
6b		John A. G. Davis (Note: Killed by a student.)	1839	November 14, 1840 (Note: Died in office.)	
7b		Gessner Harrison	1840	1842	
8		Henry St. George Tucker Sr.	1842	1844	
9		William B. Rogers (Note: Rogers later became the founder and first president of the Massachusetts Institute of Technology.)	1844	1845	
10		Edward H. Courtenay	1845	1846	
11		James L. Cabell	1846	1847	
7c		Gessner Harrison	1847	1854	
12		Socrates Maupin	1854	September 1870	
13a		Charles S. Venable	September 1870	June 1873	
14		James F. Harrison	June 1873	May 1886	
13b		Charles S. Venable	May 1886	1888	
15		William M. Thornton	1888	June 18, 1896	
16		Paul B. Barringer	June 18, 1896	June 15, 1903	
17		James Morris Page	June 15, 1903	September 12, 1904	
Presidents of the University of Virginia (1904-present)
1		Edwin Anderson Alderman	September 13, 1904	April 29, 1931	
acting		John Lloyd Newcomb	May 23, 1931	October 7, 1933	
2		John Lloyd Newcomb	October 7, 1933	June 26, 1947	
3		Colgate W. Darden Jr.	June 27, 1947	August 22, 1959	
4		Edgar F. Shannon Jr.	August 23, 1959	August 31, 1974	
5		Frank L. Hereford Jr.	September 1, 1974	August 31, 1985	
6		Robert M. O'Neil	September 1, 1985	July 31, 1990	
7		John T. Casteen III	August 1, 1990	July 31, 2010	
8		Teresa A. Sullivan	August 1, 2010	July 31, 2018	
9		James E. Ryan	August 1, 2018	July 11, 2025 (Note: Pressured into resigning.)	
acting		Jennifer Wagner Davis (Note: Executive Vice President and Chief Operating Officer)	July 12, 2025	August 10, 2025	
interim		Paul G. Mahoney	August 11, 2025	December 31, 2025	
10		Scott C. Beardsley	January 1, 2026	present	

Table notes:

== Bibliography ==
- Patton, John H.; Doswell, Sallie J. (1900). The University of Virginia: Glimpses of its past and present. Lynchburg: J.P. Bell Company.
