= Hereford College =

Residential college in Virginia, US

Hereford Residential College University of Virginia
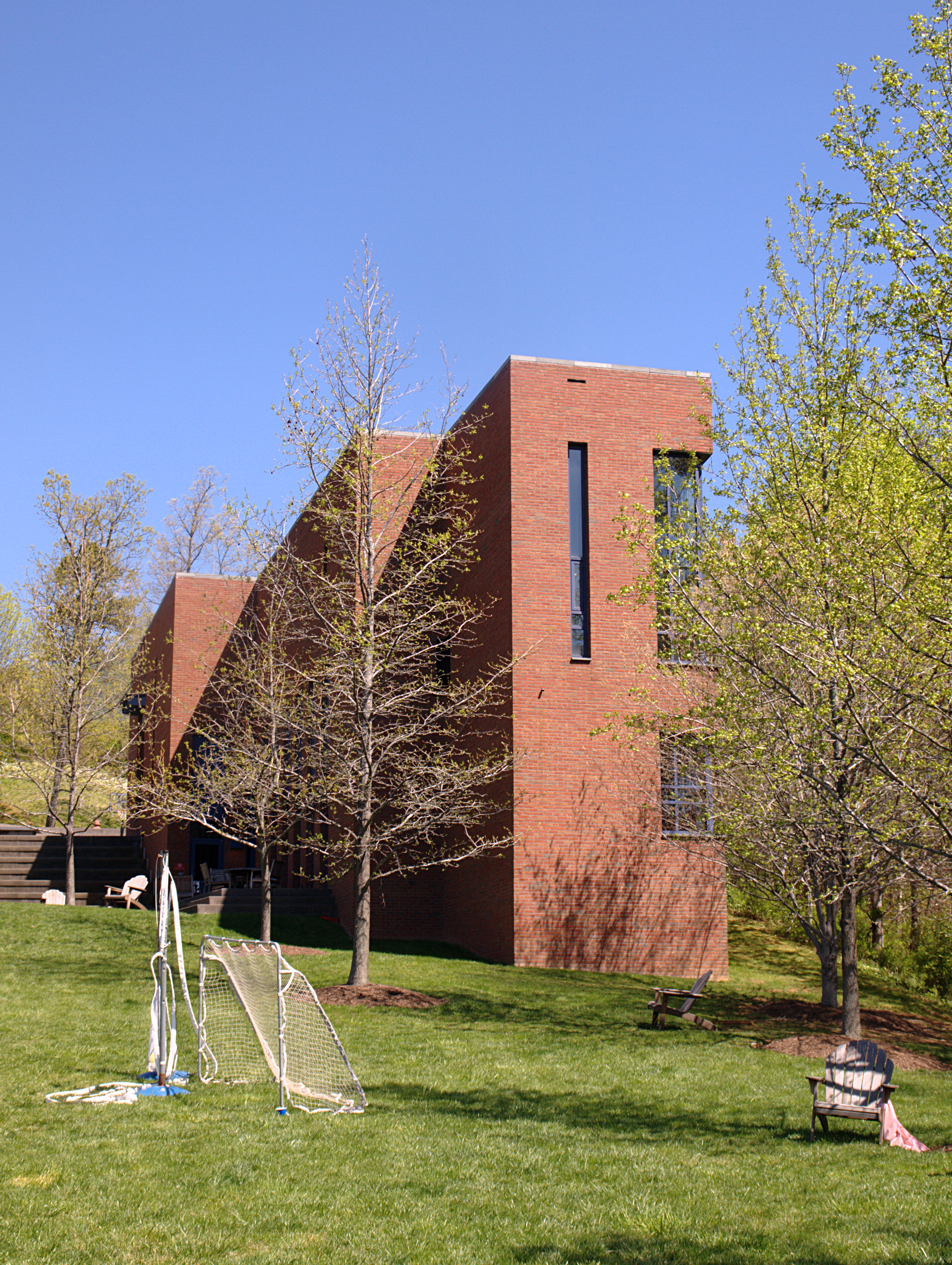
- Type: Residential college
- Established: 1992
- Affiliations: University of Virginia
- Principal: Karen K. Inkelas
- Students: 210
- Location: Charlottesville, Va., USA; 38°1′48.2″N 78°31′10.6″W
- Campus: 2 residence halls, 3 staff apartments, and 1 principal's residence
- Leadership: Hereford Student Senate
- Colors: Forest Green

Hereford College is a self-governed residential college at the University of Virginia.

Originally consisting of five dorms within one complex, the residential college has since been reduced to two dorms: Norris House and Whyburn House. Thus, only about 200 students reside in Hereford Residential College. The other three remaining residence halls, Johnson, Malone, and Wheedon (JMW) are upper-class housing.

Named after physicist Frank Hereford, who was president of the university between 1974 and 1985, the college opened in 1992 as New College, UVA's second residential college. It consists of five strikingly thin dorm buildings, Vaughan House, and its own dining hall. Hereford was designed by Tod Williams Billie Tsien Architects, which also designed the American Folk Art Museum in New York, the Neurosciences Institute in San Diego, and the Student Art Building of Johns Hopkins University.

== Living at Hereford ==
The college is unique among UVA housing in that most of the rooms are single-occupancy, meaning that most residents in the dorm area (within the Residential College and without) do not share a room with a roommate or suitemate. First years are typically assigned to double-occupancy rooms, while Second, Third, and Fourth Year students are typically assigned to single-occupancy rooms.

The college is staffed by a faculty principal. Prior to the 2026-2027 academic year, the college was also staffed by a director of studies, program coordinator, and graduate intern.

The Hereford Student Senate (HSS) governs the college; its leaders preside over a significant budget to develop programs and events. Paid for by student activities fees, the Hereford Student Senate organizes co-curricular and extracurricular events.

Hereford students were previously given first priority to participate in a 3-credit Global Studies course which includes a week-long excursion to Shanghai, China, over spring break.

== Architecture ==
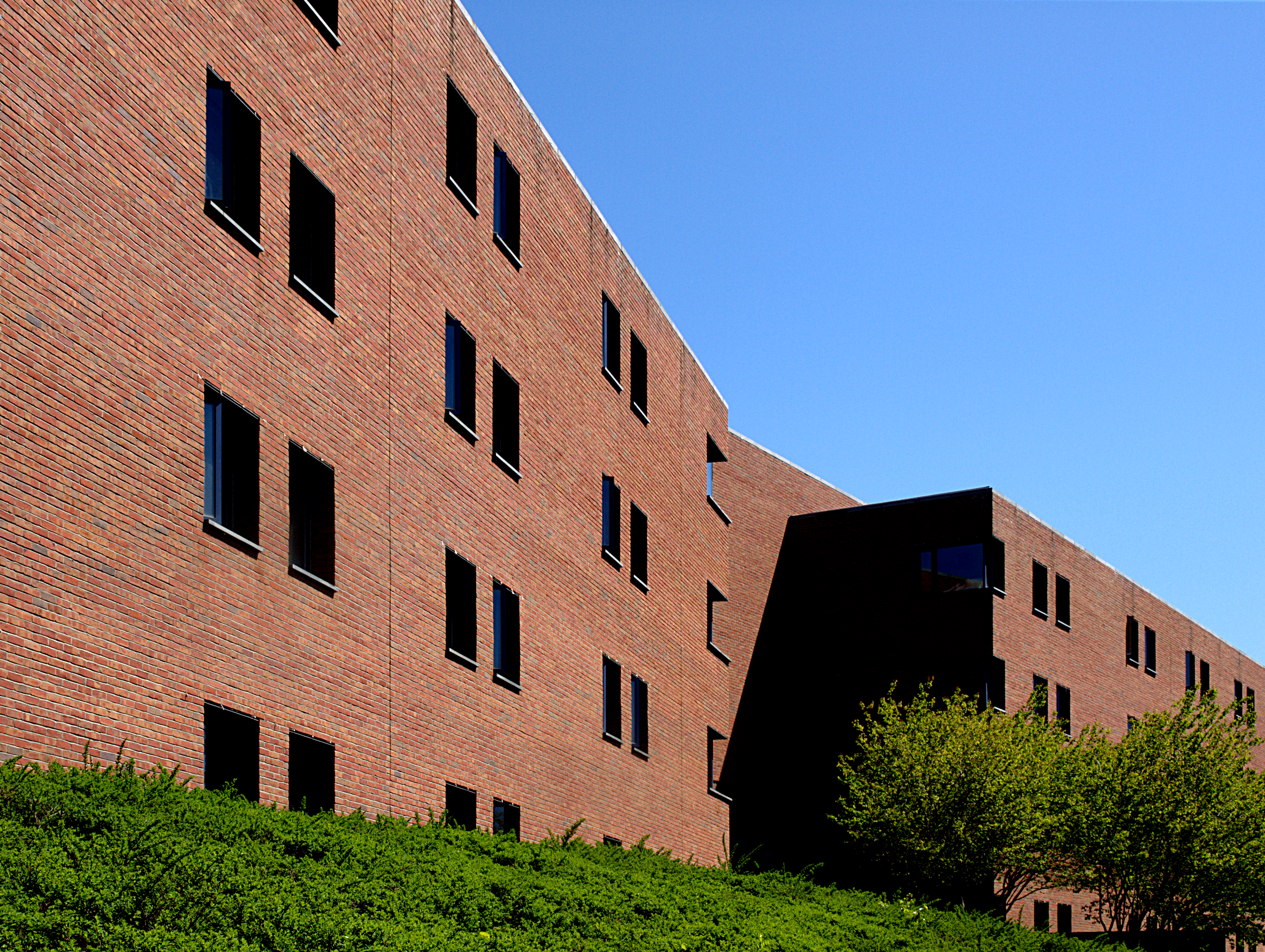
Looking down a Hereford building, many of the windows are entirely in the shade in the morning sun because of large recesses in the walls. The New York Times asserts the Hereford design "makes no attempt to follow the classicism of Jefferson; it is proudly, almost defiantly, modern."

The modernist architecture of Hereford College won great acclaim when the residential college was unveiled. The New York Times said glowingly "it is more different from Jefferson than anything that has been built at the University in generations, but it rises to challenge him" and in a later article the New York paper seemed to imply that all of New York City was jealous of the new dorm complex, stating "but for an international city, New York is sadly lacking in contemporary world-class buildings. And the lack is especially glaring considering how many world-class talents live here. Where are the buildings that can compare in formal intelligence to... Williams and Tsien's New College at the University of Virginia?"

== Grounds ==
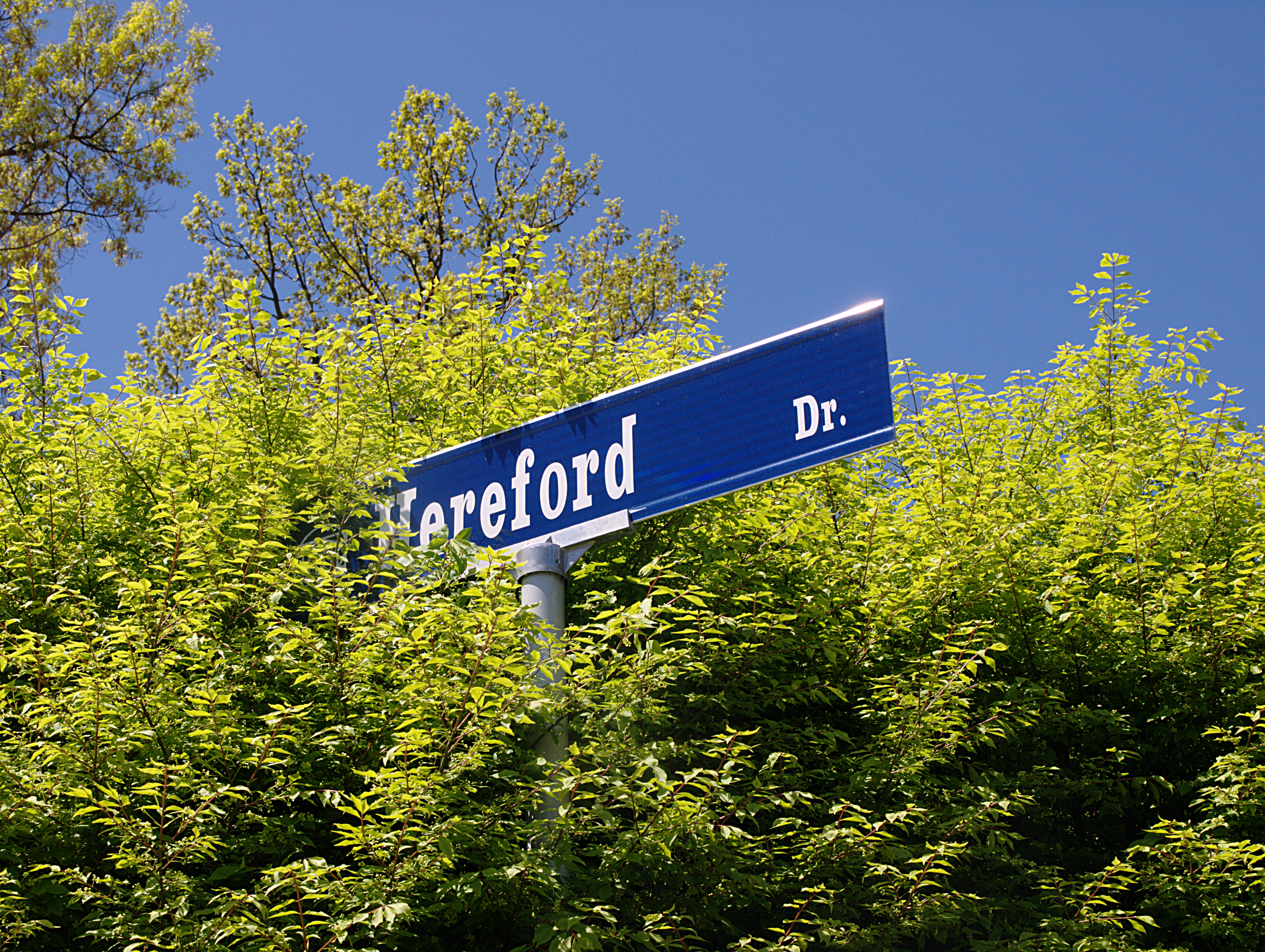
Known for its relatively remote location surrounded by conserved forestation on nearly all sides, in reality Hereford is as close or closer to Central Grounds than most upper-class housing. Buses also run regularly through the college.

The original five dorms are arranged in rows of two, two, and one, ascending a hillside. Left to right, from the bottom to the top, they are Weedon, Whyburn, Malone, Norris, and Johnson. Unfortunately, Hereford Residential College, which was originally composed of these five dorms, has now been reduced to Norris and Whyburn alone. The remaining dorms, Johnson, Malone and Weedon, currently operate as upperclass housing. The Senior Resident of Hereford lives in the basement floor of Whyburn. Vaughan House is where the principal of Hereford College lives. The basement of Vaughan House is known as the Hereford Hub and has space available for student activities. Runk Hall is the dining facility located next to the college.

The buildings were named after the following faculty members at the university.

- Nathan Johnson, Sr. (1909–1980) — professor of Education
- Dumas Malone (1892–1984) — professor of History
- Betty Norris (1927–1984) — professor of Nursing
- Benjamin Runk (1906–1994) — professor of Biology and University Dean
- Joseph Vaughan (1905–1999) — 1st Provost of the College, 1956–1960
- William Weedon (1908–1984) — professor of Mathematics and Philosophy
- Gordon Whyburn (1904–1969) — professor of Mathematics

== Hereford Principals ==
Since 1992, there have been eight Principals of Hereford College. They and their families have lived in Vaughan House at the top of the hill.

- Melvin Cherno — Physics (1992–1996, 2000)
- Daniel Bluestone — Architecture (1996–1999)
- Louis Bloomfield — Physics (2001–2007)
- Nancy Takahashi — Architecture (2007–2013)
- Wendy Cohn — Public Health (2013–2018)
- Karen Inkelas — Education (2018–2021)
- Christian Steinmetz — Higher Education (2021–2026)
- Brad Pasanek — English (2026–present)

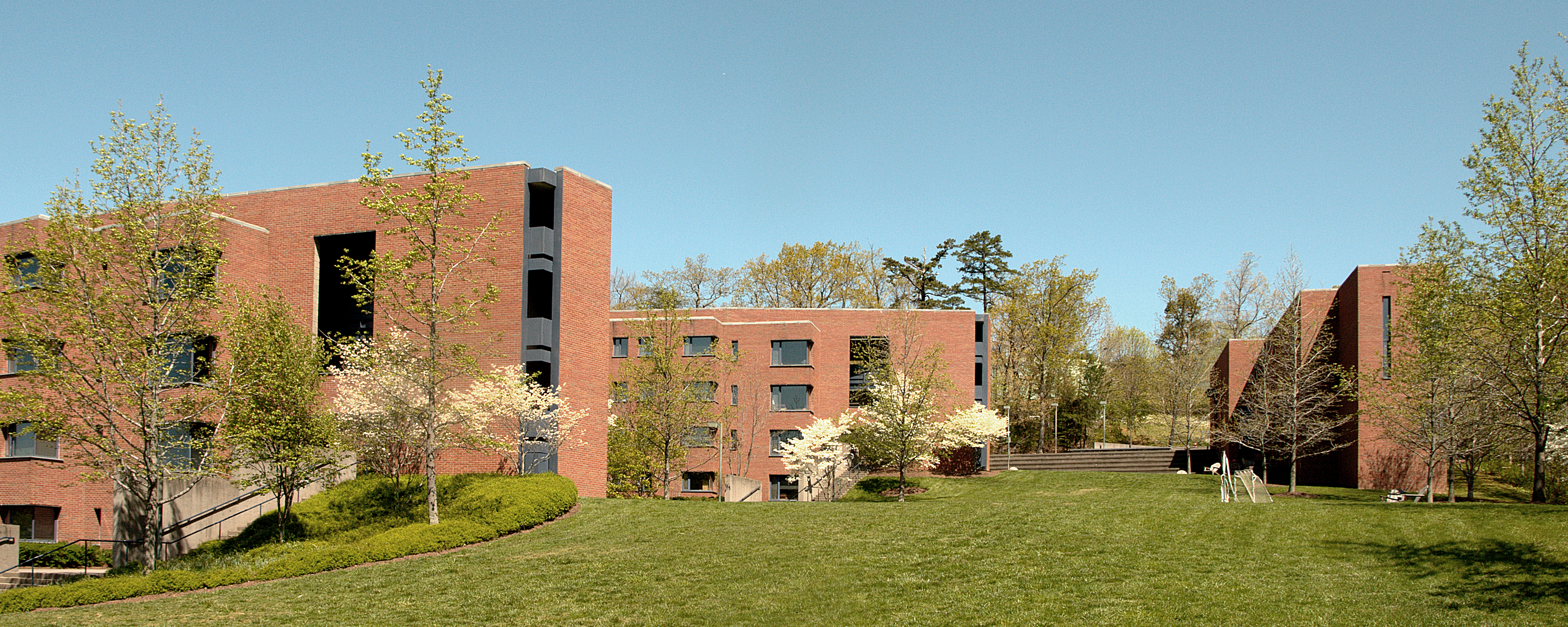
Hereford's well-landscaped Grounds include a nod to Jefferson's Lawn, though much steeper in slope as it climbs toward Observatory Hill. Students come from other residence halls, such as nearby Dillard House, to enjoy the open spaces of Hereford.

== 2008 conflict with housing office ==
Hereford College nearly closed when in November of its 17th year of operation, university housing officials declared that Hereford would begin to house only first-year students and they would not be part of any residential college arrangement. This was due to the razing of the Alderman Road "New Dorms" first-year housing area and a need to relocate students during the disruption.

The members of Hereford fought back against the administration, and won back their college in a stunning reversal. The Cavalier Daily praised Hereford students for being "role-models of student activism" and the "epitome of grassroots action rarely seen at this institution" after Hereford students wore I AM HEREFORD T-shirts for days and flooded administrative offices with phone calls and emails about the subject.

Many of the displaced first-years were instead housed at Dillard House, a former upper-class housing area located just down the hill. Hereford College itself, however, was reduced to 2 dorms, with only Norris and Whyburn allocated for Hereford College. Johnson, Malone, and Weedon were then opened to exclusively first year students. Later, Johnson, Malone, and Wheedon became upperclass housing.

== Famous residents ==
- Humayun Khan – who was commissioned an officer in the United States Army and was deployed as a captain to Iraq during the Iraq War. In 2004, he was killed in a suicide attack near Baqubah, Iraq, and was posthumously awarded a Purple Heart and Bronze Star.
- Julie Macklowe (née Julie Lerner) – New York socialite and founder of the now-defunct Vbeauté cosmetics company (lived in Norris Hall in 1996-97).
