= John B. Minor =

American jurist and academic (1813–1895)

John Barbee Minor
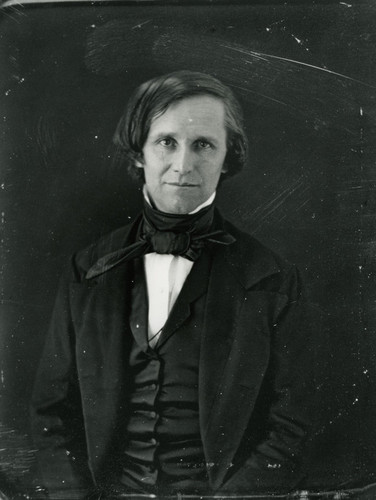
- Photograph of Minor, 1859
- Born: June 2, 1813; Louisa County, Virginia
- Died: July 29, 1895 (aged 82)
- Education: Kenyon College
- Alma mater: University of Virginia
- Occupations: Attorney, Law professor
- Spouse: Martha Macon Davis
- Children: 3
- Parent(s): Launcelot Minor; Mary Overton Tompkins

John Barbee Minor (June 2, 1813 – July 29, 1895) was an American jurist and professor of law. He practiced law in Virginia before teaching at the University of Virginia School of Law from 1845 to 1895.

== Early years ==
John Barbee Minor was born in Louisa County, Virginia, on June 2, 1813, to Launcelot Minor and Mary Overton Tompkins. At sixteen, he traveled on horseback across Virginia as a newspaper agent and collector, then walked to Ohio to enroll at Kenyon College. After one year at Kenyon, Minor was dissatisfied with his education. He decided to return to Virginia and enrolled at the University of Virginia, where he studied for three sessions, graduated from several schools, and earned his Bachelor of Laws degree in 1834, at the age of twenty-one.

During his time at the University of Virginia, he married Martha Macon Davis, sister of his law instructor (professor John A. G. Davis), and served as a tutor in the Davis household. A 1904 university history by Paul Barringer described Minor as having developed a notable 'stature and presence'.

Minor was related to the Berkeley, Maury, Dabney, Herndon, Byrd, and Page families. He maintained a close friendship and correspondence with Matthew Fontaine Maury and his kinsman B. Franklin “Frank” Minor. Maury Hall and Dabney Hall stand near Minor Hall, a building named in his honor at the University of Virginia.

== Career ==
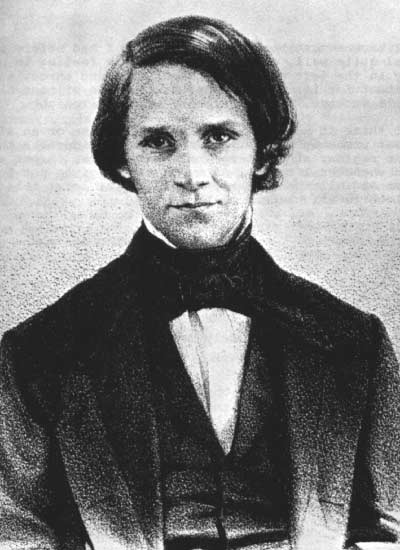
Young John B. Minor lived with his family, the Davises, and Lucy Jane Minor and her mother in the 1840s

Minor began practicing law in Buchanan, in Botetourt County. After six years, he moved to Charlottesville, Virginia, where he formed a partnership with his brother Lucian, who later became a professor of law at the College of William and Mary. In 1845, at the age of thirty-two, Minor was elected professor of law at the University of Virginia, succeeding H. St. George Tucker. He remained the sole instructor in the department until 1851. Upon the appointment of James Philemon Holcombe as adjunct professor of constitutional, international, mercantile law, and equity, Minor’s subjects became common and statutory law, in both of which he was considered an authority.

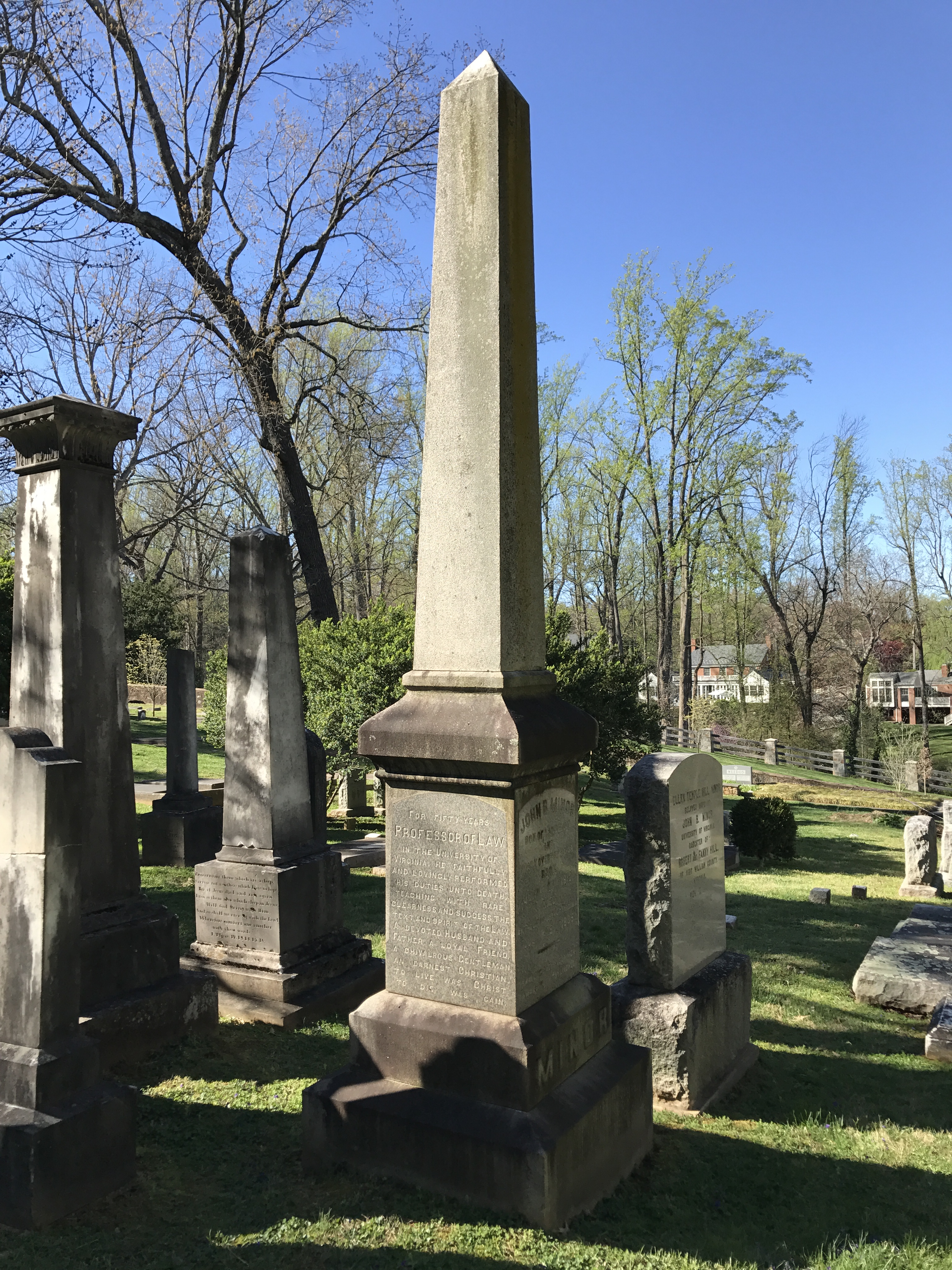
Minor's gravestone at the University of Virginia Cemetery in Charlottesville, Virginia.

During the sectional debates preceding the American Civil War, he supported the Union, but after the war began, he supported the Confederate government. Minor served as a guard and attendant at the military hospital in Louisa Court House and at the university.

As a teacher, Minor took a personal interest in his students, aiming to develop their character as well as their intellect. He influenced James Clark McReynolds, who later served as Attorney General of the United States and as a Justice of the United States Supreme Court. Future U.S. President Woodrow Wilson studied law under Minor in 1879.

== Contributions to law ==
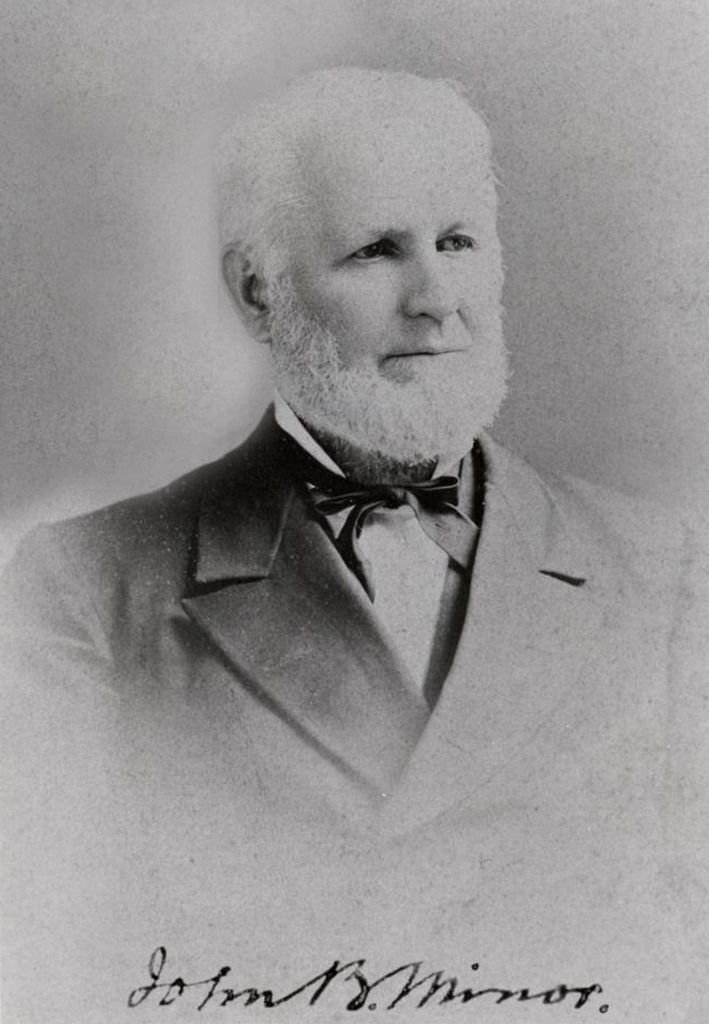
John B. Minor in October 1884

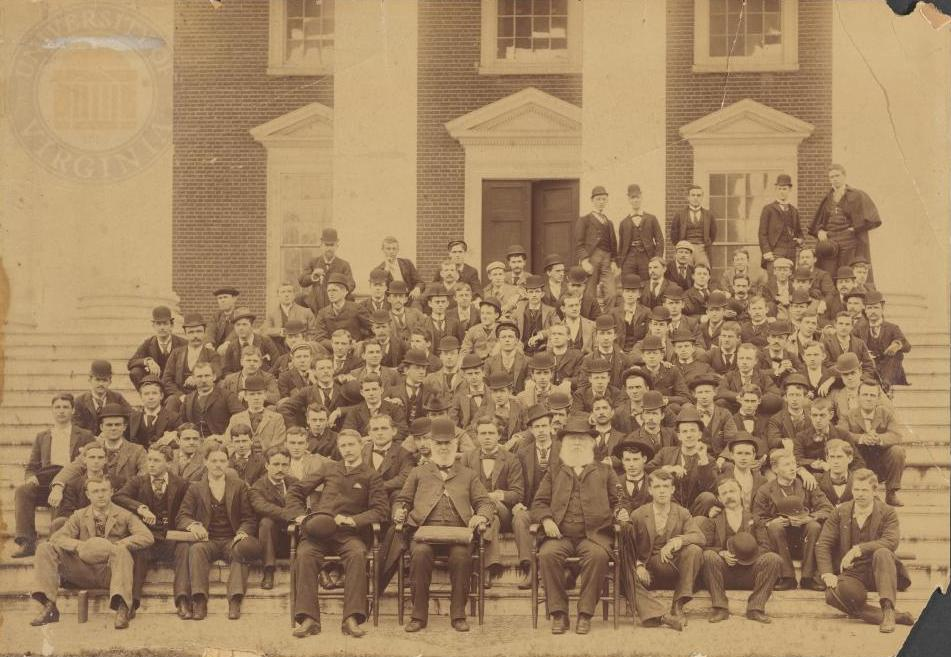
University of Virginia Law Students, 1893

In 1870, Minor inaugurated a summer course of law lectures, regarded as the first summer law school in the United States. The program gained wide popularity, enrolling over one hundred students.

In 1875, Minor published his first of four volumes of Institutes of Common and Statute Law. The second volume of the Institutes of Common and Statute Law came later in 1875, followed by the fourth in 1878. The third volume, long circulated in pamphlet form among Minor’s students, was not issued in complete form until 1895. Of his Institutes of Common and Statute Law, Senator Daniel said: "It cannot be surpassed as a vade mecum of the law; it is like a statue, solid, compact, clean cut; it contains more law in fewer words than any work with which I am acquainted."

In addition to his Institutes, Minor published The Virginia Reports, 1799–1800 in 1850, and in 1894 issued the Exposition of the Law of Crimes and Punishments, a work that remained in general use for many years.

== Honors ==
Minor received the honorary degree of Doctor of Laws from both Washington and Lee and from Columbia. On the fiftieth anniversary of his teaching career, the Law Alumni of the University honored Minor with a life-size marble bust. The bust was placed on a polished pedestal inscribed with the words: “He taught the law and the reason thereof.” James Russell Lowell wrote his obituary, noting Minor had signed more law diplomas than anyone in the country's history. Minor Hall, which housed the law school from 1911 to 1932, was named in his honor. The University of Virginia School of Law also established the John B. Minor Professorship in Law and History.

== Works ==
- Minor, John B. A Synopsis of the Law of Crimes and Punishments in Virginia: For the Use of the Students of Law in the University of Virginia. Richmond, Va: M.W. Hazlewood, 1869.
- Minor, John B. Synopsis of the Practice of the Law in Virginia in Civil Cases. Charlottesville, Va., 1874.
- Minor, John B. Institutes of Common and Statute Law. Third edition. Richmond: Printed for the author, 1882. 2 v.
- Minor, John B. Part of the Law of Personal Property: Including the Law of Bankruptcy and the Law of Executors & Administrations. 1888.
- Minor, John B. Synopsis of the Law of Crimes and Punishments. 1890.
- Minor, John B. Exposition of the Law of Crimes and Punishments. Richmond: The author, 1894.
- Minor, John B, and Raleigh C. Minor. University of Virginia: Private Summer Course of Law Lectures, 1895: Lectures to Commence June 27th, (4th Thursday), and to Continue Two Months. Charlottesville, Va.: 1895.
