= Farmington Country Club =

Country club in Charlottesville, Virginia, US

Coordinates: 38.0616°N 78.5419°W

The Farmington Country Club is a country club in Charlottesville, Virginia, United States. The octagonal east wing of the clubhouse, constructed in 1802 near the University of Virginia as an addition to a pre-1780 structure, was designed by Thomas Jefferson. Membership is by invitation only.

== History ==
Chain of title

- July 25, 1745, Michael Holland conveyed this land to Charles Lewis of Goochland.
- April 7, 1758, Charles Lewis conveyed to Francis Jerdone of Louisa.
- April 11, 1785, Francis Jerdone conveyed to George Divers.
- June 1, 1830, George Divers devised this land, by will, to his nephew, Isaac White.
- November 23, 1840, Isaac White conveyed to John Coles Carter, 815 acres (3.30 km^{2}) more or less.
- September 30, 1852, John C. Carter conveyed to General Bernard Peyton.
- July 3, 1854, General Bernard Peyton devised this land, by will, to his widow, Mrs. Julia A. Peyton.
- January 1, 1860, Mrs. Julia A. Peyton conveyed to Mrs. Mary Ann Harper her deed calling for 881 acres (3.57 km^{2}) more or less.
- May 7, 1877, Mrs. Harper devised this land, by will, to her daughter, Miss Lucille Wood, and her son, Warner Wood. Miss Lucille Wood died intestate, leaving her brother, Warner Wood, as sole heir at law.
- September 2, 1902, Warner Wood left Farmington to his widow, Mrs. Maggie L. Wood by will.
- September 15, 1927, Mrs. Maggie L. Wood and J. W. Fishburne, surviving executor of deceased Warner Wood, conveyed to Farmington, Incorporated.
- April 8, 1979, the writer Breece D'J Pancake committed suicide in the backyard of a house he rented at One Blue Ridge Lane located on grounds of the country club.
- April 12, 1979, Farmington, Incorporated sold Farmington Country Club to the membership.

== Description ==
What is now the clubhouse was originally a spacious plantation house with an elongated wing that contained several guest rooms for the Divers' extended family. It was originally designed by Thomas Jefferson and completed in 1803. Separate quarters existed for enslaved African American workers, who by 1820 numbered 112 individuals. The farm buildings consisted of rows of box stalls for horses (since converted to locker rooms), large barns, and numerous other buildings. The main house, or clubhouse, is a large, impressive brick structure. Through the portico, one enters the Jefferson Room. In 1976, the Jefferson Room was restored under the direction of Dr. Frederick D. Nichols, professor of Jeffersonian architecture at the University of Virginia.

Similar to the all-weather passageway at Monticello, a covered passageway with flying buttresses led the plantation's residents from the main house to the stable.

Except for the barns and a number of outlying buildings, all of the original buildings have been retained and updated. The guest wing has been converted into a "Guest Gallery". Below and in front of this gallery is the swimming pool. Since the club opened in 1929, two additional guest galleries have been added, both in keeping with the original design. One is an extension of the first gallery. The second faces the first tee of the 18-hole golf course and is adjacent to the Farmington Grill.

== Controversy ==
The club has always admitted new members by invitation only. Farmington gained notoriety in the late 1960s and mid-1970s for its whites-only membership policy. University of Virginia President Edgar F. Shannon Jr. resigned from the club in the late 1960s and the university banned the use of university funds for entertaining in segregated facilities for a period of time. In 1976, University of Virginia President Frank Hereford's membership resulted in controversy at the university and one faculty resignation. The incident became the catalyst for social change at the university including the establishment of an Office of Minority Affairs. Although Farmington Country Club remains private, with membership by invitation only, since its members purchased the club in 1979, Farmington Country Club adopted a membership policy which does not discriminate on the basis of age, national origin, race, religion, gender, sexual orientation or physical ability. Charlottesville and Albemarle County elected officials, clergy, racial justice activists, historians, educators, community leaders and descendants of local enslaved persons gathered on the club's property in July 2018 to hold a memorial service for John Henry James, an African American man from Charlottesville who was lynched there in 1898 at what was then Wood's Crossing. In October 2018, the bar at Farmington Country Club was the site of a fracas between diners: conservative Fox News host Tucker Carlson, and a local Latino artist who was expelled from club membership after the incident.
