= Robert M. O'Neil =

American lawyer and educator (1934–2018)

- Born: Robert Marchant O'Neil; October 16, 1934; Boston, Massachusetts, U.S.
- Died: September 30, 2018 (aged 83); Washington, D.C., U.S.
- Education: Harvard University
- Occupation: Educator
- Known for: President of the University of Virginia
- Term: 1985–1990
- Predecessor: Frank Hereford
- Successor: John T. Casteen III

Robert Marchant O'Neil (October 16, 1934 – September 30, 2018) was an American lawyer and educator. A specialist in constitutional law, he served as president of the University of Virginia (1985–1990) and created the Thomas Jefferson Center for the Protection of Free Expression, whose director he became (1990–2010). During these years, O'Neil remained associated with the university's law school, where he taught courses in the First Amendment and the Arts, Speech and Press, Church and State, and Free Speech in Cyberspace.

== Early and family life ==
O'Neil was born in Boston, Massachusetts on October 16, 1934. He attended Harvard University in nearby Cambridge, Massachusetts and earned an undergraduate baccalaureate degree in 1956. The following year, he received a master's degree (MA), and received a Bachelor in Law degree (LLB) from Harvard Law School in 1961. O’Neil later received honorary degrees from Beloit College and Indiana University (LLD, 1987).

He married Karen Elson, who would teach English and direct college counseling at St. Anne's-Belfield School in Charlottesville, Virginia. After 51 years of marriage, she survived him, as did three adult sons, an adult daughter and 13 grandchildren.

== Teaching career ==
After graduating from law school, O'Neil served as a law clerk for Justice William J. Brennan of the Supreme Court of the United States during the 1962–1963 term. In 1963, he joined the law faculty of the University of California, Berkeley School of Law. While there, chaired the Academic Senate Committee on Academic Freedom.

From 1963 to 1967, O'Neil taught at Berkeley, then accepted a position as law professor at SUNY/Buffalo, where he also became executive assistant to president Martin Myerson. After SUNY, O'Neil returned to Berkeley. He also at various times taught at the law schools of the University of Cincinnati College of Law, Indiana University at Bloomington, and the University of Wisconsin Law School. O'Neil became known for his defense of affirmative action and his study of the First Amendment promises.

== Administrative career ==
In 1972, O'Neil began a career in academic administration after accepting a position of vice president and provost for academic affairs of the University of Cincinnati, rising to executive vice president of academic affairs the following year. In 1975 O'Neil became vice president for the Bloomington campus of Indiana University. In 1980 he became the president of the University of Wisconsin System.

In 1985, O'Neil became president of the University of Virginia, although he continued in other associations. For example, he served as general counsel of the Committee of the American Association of University Professors. He held this position for two years in the early 1970s and another two years in the early 1990s. He became president of this committee in 1999. For almost two decades he was a trustee for the Carnegie Foundation for the Advancement of Teaching, the Educational Testing Service and the Johnson Foundation. He held the chairmanship of several organizations, including the National Association of State Universities, Land-Grant Colleges, and the boards of directors of the Virginia Coalition for Open Government. He was an executive member of the Association of American Universities and WVPT Public Television, the American Bar Association’s Human Rights Journal and the National Advisory Board of the American Civil Liberties Union.

O'Neil was the director of the Ford Foundation's Difficult Dialogues Initiative. He also participated on the Board of Consulting Editors of Trusteeship, journal of the Association of Governing Boards, journal of the Association of Governing Boards.

== Publications ==
O’Neil has written numerous articles for law reviews and other journals and is the author of several books, including:

- The Rights of Public Employees (2nd ed.). Southern Illinois University Press. 1993. ISBN 0-8093-1927-6.
- Classrooms in the Crossfire. Indiana University Press. 1981. ISBN 0-253-17933-5.
- Free Speech in the College Community. Indiana University Press. 1997. ISBN 0-253-33267-2.
- The First Amendment and Civil Liability. Indiana University Press. 2001. ISBN 0-253-34033-0.
- Academic Freedom in the Wired World. Harvard University Press. 2007. ISBN 978-0-674-02660-5.

== See also ==
- List of law clerks for the third seat of the Supreme Court of the United States
