= Edgar F. Shannon Jr. =

American university president (1918–1997)

Edgar Finley Shannon Jr.
- Born: June 4, 1918
- Died: August 24, 1997 (aged 79); Charlottesville, Virginia, United States
- Resting place: University of Virginia Cemetery
- Education: Washington and Lee University; Merton College, Oxford
- Occupation: Educator
- Known for: President of the University of Virginia
- Term: 1959–1974
- Predecessor: Colgate Darden
- Successor: Frank L. Hereford Jr.
- Spouse: Eleanor Bosworth (m. 1956–1997)
- Children: 5

Edgar Finley Shannon Jr. (June 4, 1918 – August 24, 1997) was a professor of English and president of the University of Virginia from 1959 to 1974. The University’s main library was renamed in Shannon’s honor in 2024.

== Biography ==
Shannon attended Washington and Lee University as an undergraduate, where he was an initiate of Omicron Delta Kappa. He also studied at Merton College, Oxford, on a Rhodes Scholarship from 1947 to 1950. While at Oxford, Shannon played for the Oxford University Men's Basketball Team. He was a veteran of the United States Navy, having served on the U.S.S. Quincy during World War II. He joined the faculty of the University of Virginia in 1956.

Accomplishments during his administration include the establishment of the University of Virginia Press, the establishment of the Center for Advanced Studies, and the creation of the Echols Scholar program. Shannon also oversaw significant increases in the value of the endowment; in 1962, a survey by the American Association of University Professors ranked the university first in the value of its endowment in proportion to its enrollment.

One of Shannon's most significant legacies to the university was a building program that included the construction of Gilmer Hall, the Chemistry Building, Wilson Hall, the architecture building (Edmund S. Campbell Hall); the Fiske Kimball Library; the university's nuclear reactor; University Hall; the "new dormitories" (Alderman Road and Observatory houses), as well as additions to many university buildings and the purchase of the Old Ivy Inn and Birdwood. The restoration of the Rotunda to its original state was funded and work was begun during Shannon's administration.

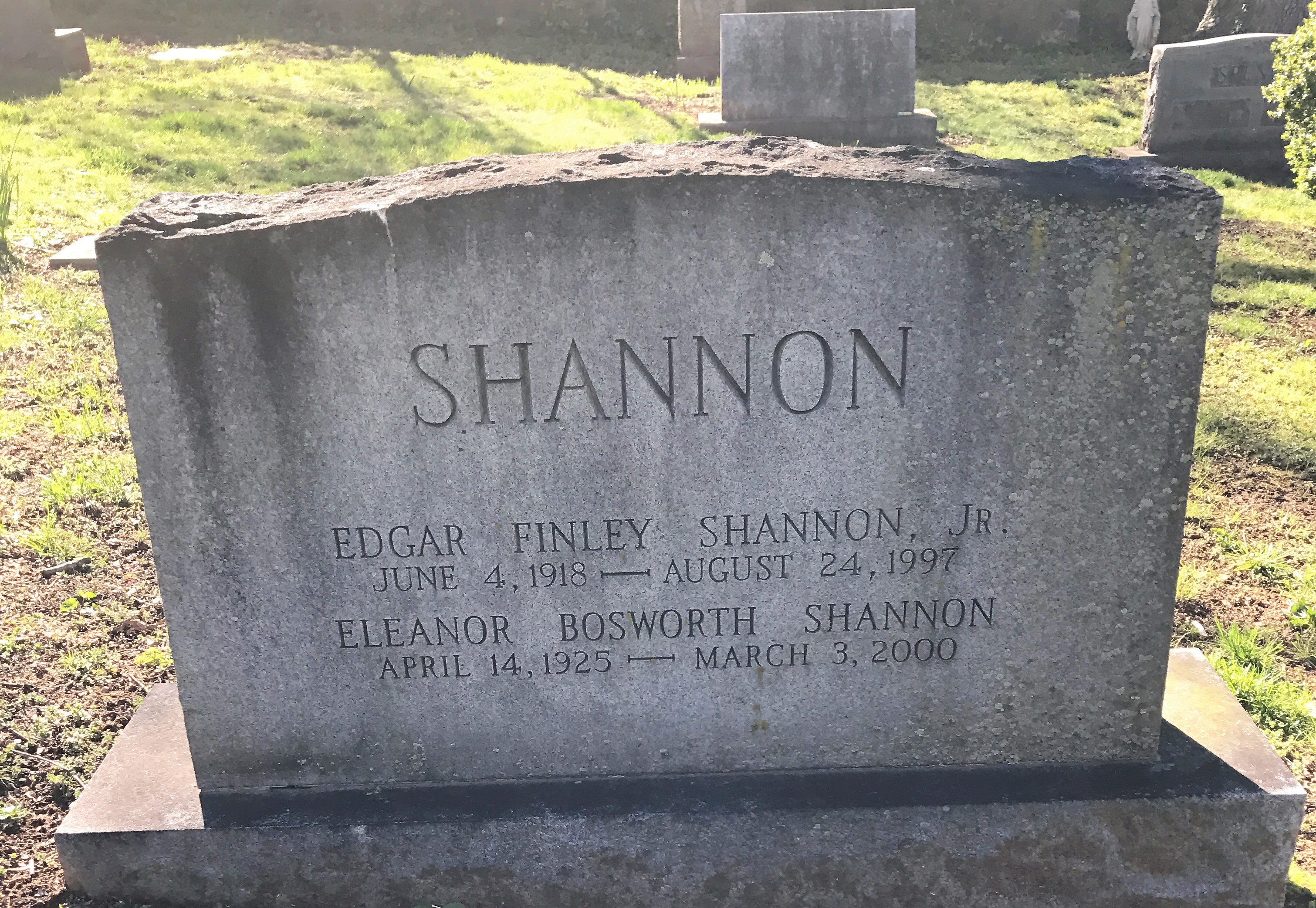
Shannon's gravestone at the University of Virginia Cemetery in Charlottesville, Virginia.

Shannon's presidency encompassed the 1960s, and he helped to lead the university's response to social trends of the time. As President, Shannon resigned his membership in the Farmington Country Club over its refusal to admit black members, and worked to increase recruiting of black students and faculty. He also initiated undergraduate coeducation over the protests of alumni. He is perhaps most remembered for his response to growing student unrest over the Vietnam War, during which he sent a letter to President Nixon opposing the invasion of Cambodia. In 1980 he was given the Laurel Crowned Circle Award, Omicron Delta Kappa's highest honor.
He is buried at the University of Virginia Cemetery.

== Legacy ==
A movement to rename the University of Virginia’s main library building, originally named after first UVA president Edwin Alderman, began in September 2019. A proposal to rename the library was tabled by the Building and Grounds Committee of the University's Board of Visitors in December 2023, prior to the library’s reopening after extensive revisions; the proposal would have renamed the library in honor of Shannon. Following the library’s opening in the spring semester, an open letter supporting the proposed change was signed by over 1000 students, faculty, staff, and student organizations, including the Student Council. The Buildings and Grounds Committee voted 10-1 in favor of the change on February 29, 2024, and the following day the full Board of Visitors voted to rename the library in honor of Shannon.
