= Robert Kent Gooch =

American football player and track athlete (1893–1982)

Bobby Gooch
- Gooch in 1912

Profile
- Position: Quarterback

Personal information
- Born: September 26, 1893; Roanoke, Virginia, US
- Died: May 22, 1982 (aged 88)

Career information
- College: Virginia (1912–1914)

Awards and highlights
- SAIAA championship (1914); All-Southern (1914)

Robert Kent Gooch (September 26, 1893 – May 22, 1982) was an American football player and political scientist. Gooch was a quarterback for the Virginia Cavaliers football team of the University of Virginia. He was named a Rhodes Scholar, but the First World War interrupted his studies. During the war, Gooch served with the American Ambulance Corps with the French forces on the Somme front, and was awarded the Croix de Guerre. For many years Gooch was a political science professor at UVA, writing several books.

== Early life ==
Gooch was born on September 26, 1893, in Roanoke to William Stapleton Gooch, a lawyer, and Mary Stuart Anderson. His ancestry was English and French; a descendant of Sir William Gooch, 1st Baronet. In 1895, the family moved to Louisa Court House, VA.

=== University of Virginia ===
He is the namesake of the Robert Kent Gooch Scholarship, for second and third-year college students who have a record of outstanding academic achievement and a record of outstanding service to others.

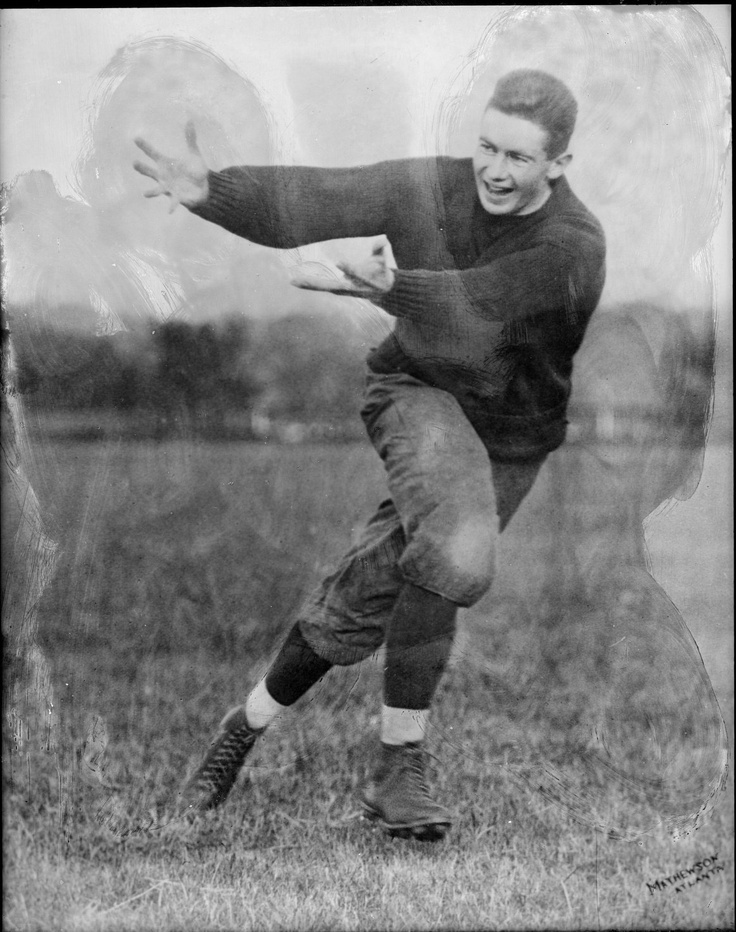
Gooch in 1914.

Gooch played quarterback for Virginia from 1912 to 1914. He led the Cavaliers to an 8–1 record in 1914, when he was teammates with the likes of Buck Mayer and James L. White. One fellow said, "When Gooch took the ball he moved so fast that he seemed to be in four places at one time, and the referee tried to penalize Virginia for having 15 men on the field." Professor W. A. Lambeth of Virginia selected Gooch for his All-Southern team in 1914. He later returned as an assistant coach at his alma mater.

== Political scientist ==
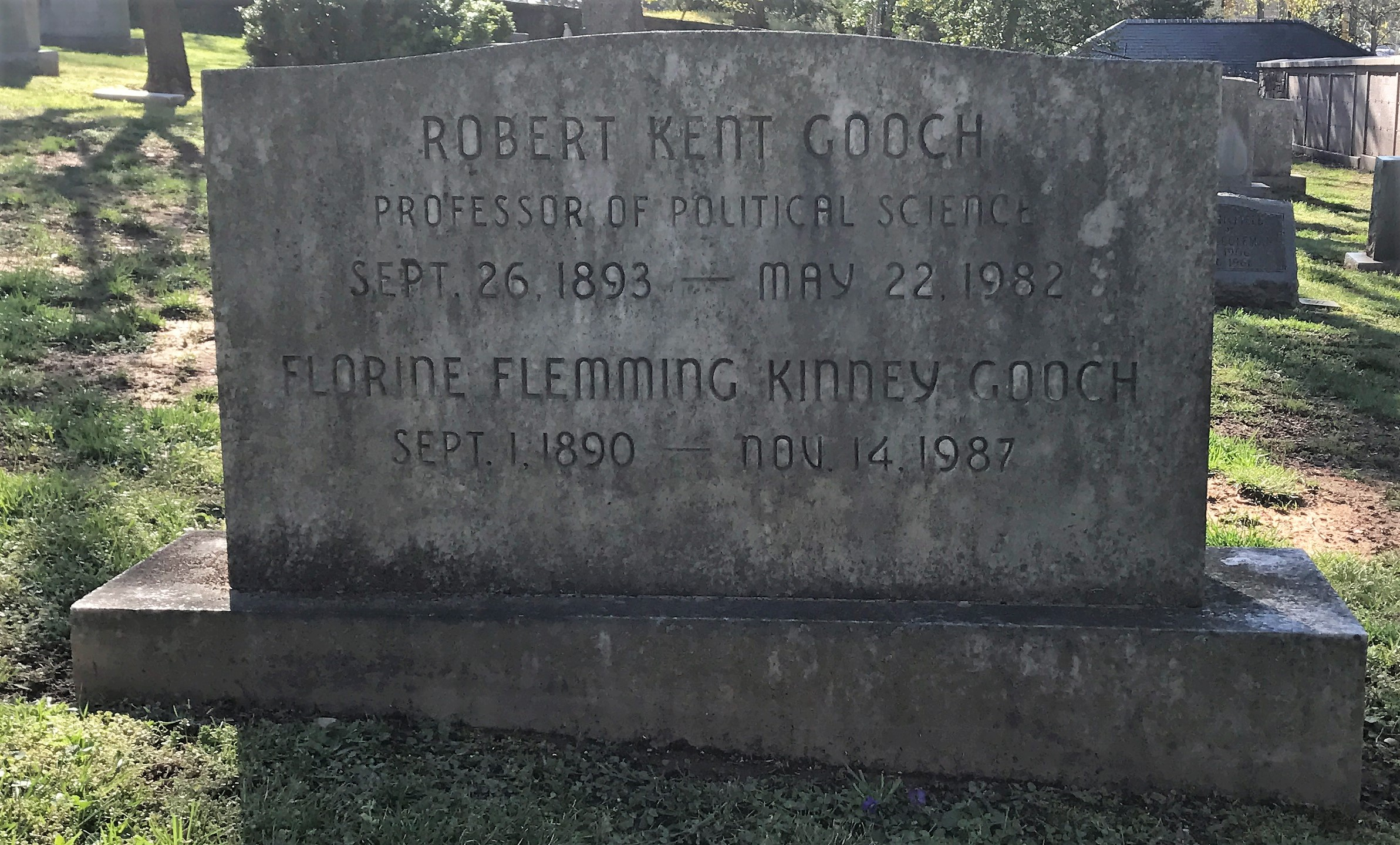
Gooch's gravestone at the University of Virginia Cemetery in Charlottesville, Virginia.

A named professorship of political science, the Robert Kent Gooch Professor of Politics, was established in his honor at the university, with Larry Sabato the incumbent as of 2018.

=== Later life and death ===
He is buried at the University of Virginia Cemetery.
