= Edwin Alderman =

American educator, first president of the University of Virginia (1861–1931)

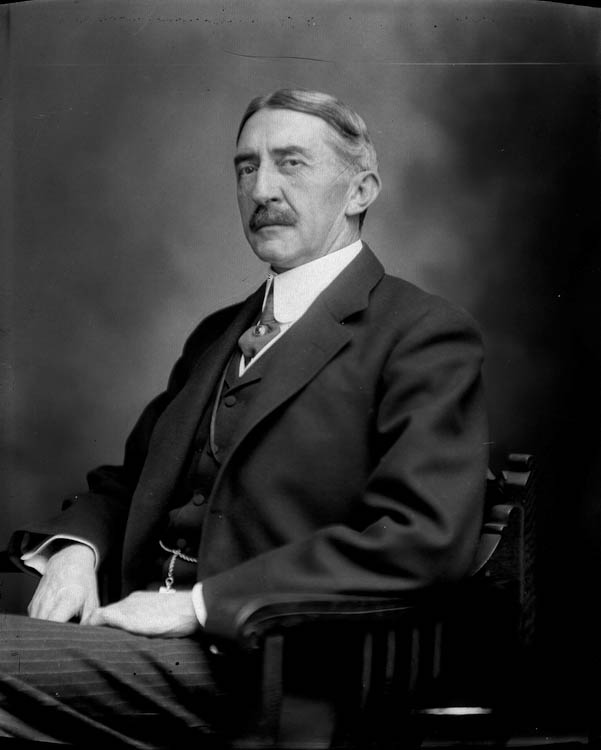
- 1912 photo of Edwin Alderman by Rufus Holsinger
- Born: May 15, 1861; Wilmington, North Carolina, U.S.
- Died: April 30, 1931 (aged 69); Connellsville, Pennsylvania, U.S.
- Resting place: University of Virginia Cemetery
- Education: University of North Carolina at Chapel Hill (PhB); University of the South (DCL); Tulane University (LLD); Johns Hopkins University (LLD)
- Occupation: Educator
- Known for: First President of the University of Virginia; President of University of North Carolina and Tulane University

Edwin Anderson Alderman (May 15, 1861 – April 30, 1931) was an American scholar and university administrator who served as president of the University of North Carolina, Tulane University, and, most notably, the University of Virginia.

Alderman was the key leader in higher education in Virginia during the Progressive Era as president of the University of Virginia, 1904–31. His goal was the transformation of the Southern university into a force for state service and intellectual leadership. Alderman successfully professionalized and modernized Virginia's system of higher education. He promoted international standards of scholarship and a statewide network of extension services. Joined by other college presidents, he promoted the Virginia Education Commission, created in 1910. Alderman's crusade encountered some resistance from traditionalists, but never challenged the Jim Crow system of segregated schooling. A reassessment of Alderman's legacy began in the 2010s, culminating in the removal of his name from the University of Virginia's main library in 2024.

== Early years ==
Alderman was born in Wilmington, North Carolina, on May 15, 1861. He was son of James and Susan (Corbett) Alderman, grandson of Patrick and Susan (Wallace) Alderman and descended from Scotch and English ancestors, who emigrated in 1774 and settled on Lower Cape Fear at North Carolina.

Alderman was prepared for college at the schools in Wilmington and at Bethel Military Academy, Virginia, from 1876 to 1878. In 1882 he graduated with a Bachelor of Philosophy from the University of North Carolina, where he was a member of the Dialectic Society.

== Career ==
He became a schoolteacher in Goldsboro, North Carolina, superintendent of city schools there, from 1885 to 1889, and conductor of the state teachers' institutes, from 1889 to 1892. In 1891, Alderman and Charles Duncan McIver successfully pressed the North Carolina Legislature to establish the Normal and Industrial School for White Women, now known as the University of North Carolina at Greensboro.

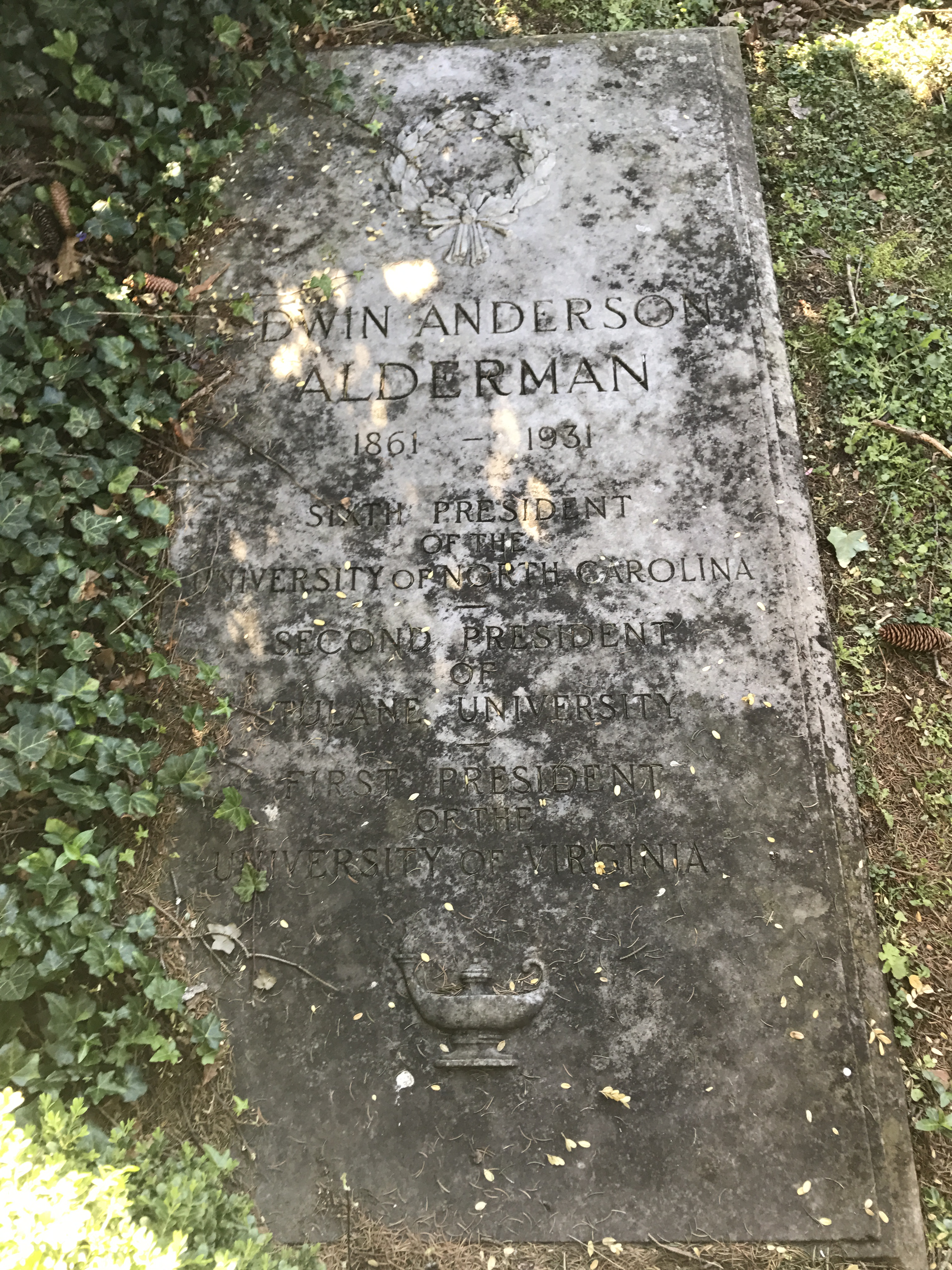
Alderman's gravestone at the University of Virginia Cemetery in Charlottesville, Virginia.

He was elected a member of the American Historical Association in 1892, member of the Maryland Historical Society in 1893, and member of the National Education Association in 1894. In 1892 Alderman became professor of history at State Normal College and taught there until 1893 when he became professor of pedagogy at the University of North Carolina, and he was named president of that institution in 1896, then he moved on to take the same position at Tulane University in 1900, before moving again to the University of Virginia in 1904. There he stayed for 27 years, until his death in 1931 from a stroke in Connellsville, Pennsylvania, while en route to deliver a speech in Illinois. He is buried at the University of Virginia Cemetery.

Alderman received the D.C.L. from the University of the South in 1896, also received the degree of LL.D. from Tulane University in 1898, and from Johns Hopkins University in 1902. He was a noted public speaker, and won fame for his memorial address for Woodrow Wilson, delivered to a joint session of Congress on December 15, 1924.

Alderman was elected to the American Philosophical Society in 1925.

== At the University of Virginia ==
In 1904, the Board of Visitors of the University of Virginia invited Alderman, then president of Tulane University, to become the first president of the University of Virginia. Since its founding in 1819, university had been governed by its Board of Visitors, but increasing discord between Visitors and the faculty, as well as the rising administrative burden of dealing with expanding academic departments and burgeoning student enrollments, led to the decision to move forward with the creation of the office of the president. University chairman James Morris Page stepped down in 1904, as the office of chairman was dissolved, to be replaced with a presidency.

Alderman was not the first choice for the new office. After considering other candidates, including Virginia Law former student Woodrow Wilson, the Board had first invited its former member George W. Miles, a colonel who had served on the staff of Virginia Governor James Hoge Tyler. The faculty opposed Miles' nomination and he was forced to withdraw. Other candidates were proposed, including Francis Preston Venable (who had succeeded Alderman as president of the University of North Carolina), but Alderman was unanimously chosen as the consensus candidate on June 14, 1904. He began to serve in the fall of 1904 but was not formally inaugurated until April 13, 1905 (Thomas Jefferson's birthday, celebrated as Founder's Day).

The University of Virginia changed in several significant ways under Alderman's guidance. First, he focused new attention on matters of public concern, helped create departments of geology and forestry, added significantly to the University Hospital to support new sickbeds and public health research, helped create the School of Education and Human Development (formerly the Curry School of Education), established the extension and summer school programs, and helped create the first school of finance and commerce at the school. He then restructured existing programs, separating the former “academic department” into the College of Arts and Sciences and Graduate School of Arts and Sciences, in accordance with a growing move to standardize college educations by the Association of American Universities. The enrollment of the school greatly increased under his administration, as well, going from 500 regular session students in 1904 to 2,200 in 1929.

Alderman also laid the financial groundwork for the university's future. During the first years of his presidency he established its first endowment fund and led the fundraising of almost $700,000 to meet a $500,000 challenge grant from Andrew Carnegie. By the end of his presidency the endowment would increase to $10 million.

He spent two-thirds of his long-term at the University of Virginia physically disabled after a bad bout with tuberculosis.

== Academic career ==
- 1896-1900 – President of the University of North Carolina (Chapel Hill, North Carolina)
- 1900-1904 – President of Tulane University (New Orleans, Louisiana)
- 1904-1931 – President of the University of Virginia (Charlottesville, Virginia)

== Legacy and library name change ==
Edwin A. Alderman Elementary School in Wilmington and the Alderman dorm at the University of North Carolina at Chapel Hill are named after him.

In 1938, the newly-constructed main library of the University of Virginia was named after Alderman in honor of his legacy. During the late 2010s, the name started to come under criticism in light of his racial attitudes and policies. During his tenure at the University, Alderman had recruited eugenicists to the University's faculty, from which they disseminated eugenic theories that asserted the genetic inferiority of Black people and supported segregation and forced sterilization. In September 2019, fliers quoting racist comments made by Alderman were anonymously posted around the University's campus. One quote read: "It is settled, I believe, that this white man who has shown himself so full of courage and force, shall rule in the South, because he is fittest to rule." The fliers argued that the Alderman name should be removed from the library. In December 2019, U.Va. Libraries established a committee to consider renaming the library. In June 2021, that group requested that the University's Naming and Memorials Committee consider changing the name. In December 2023, as the library prepared to reopen after extensive renovations, the Building and Grounds Committee of the University's Board of Visitors tabled a proposal to remove Alderman's name from the library. The proposal would have renamed the library in honor of Edgar Shannon, the University's fourth President. After the library opened in the spring semester, an open letter supporting the proposed change was signed by over 1000 students, faculty, staff, and student organizations, including the Student Council. On February 29, 2024, the Buildings and Grounds Committee voted 10-1 in favor of the change, and the full Board of Visitors voted the next day to rename the library in honor of Shannon.

== Works ==
Alderman is the author of

- An address, delivered Oct. 15th, 1892 (1893)
- Life of William Hooper, Signer of the Declaration of Independence (1894)
- Short History of North Carolina (1896)
- Library of Southern literature (1909) as editor

Academic offices
Preceded by George Tayloe Winston	President of the University of North Carolina at Chapel Hill; 1896–1900	Succeeded by Francis Preston Venable
Preceded by William Oscar Rogers (acting)	President of Tulane University; 1900–1904	Succeeded by Edwin Boone Craighead
Preceded by Board of Visitors	President of the University of Virginia; 1904–1931	Succeeded by John Lloyd Newcomb
