= University of Virginia Cemetery =

University of Virginia Cemetery and Columbarium
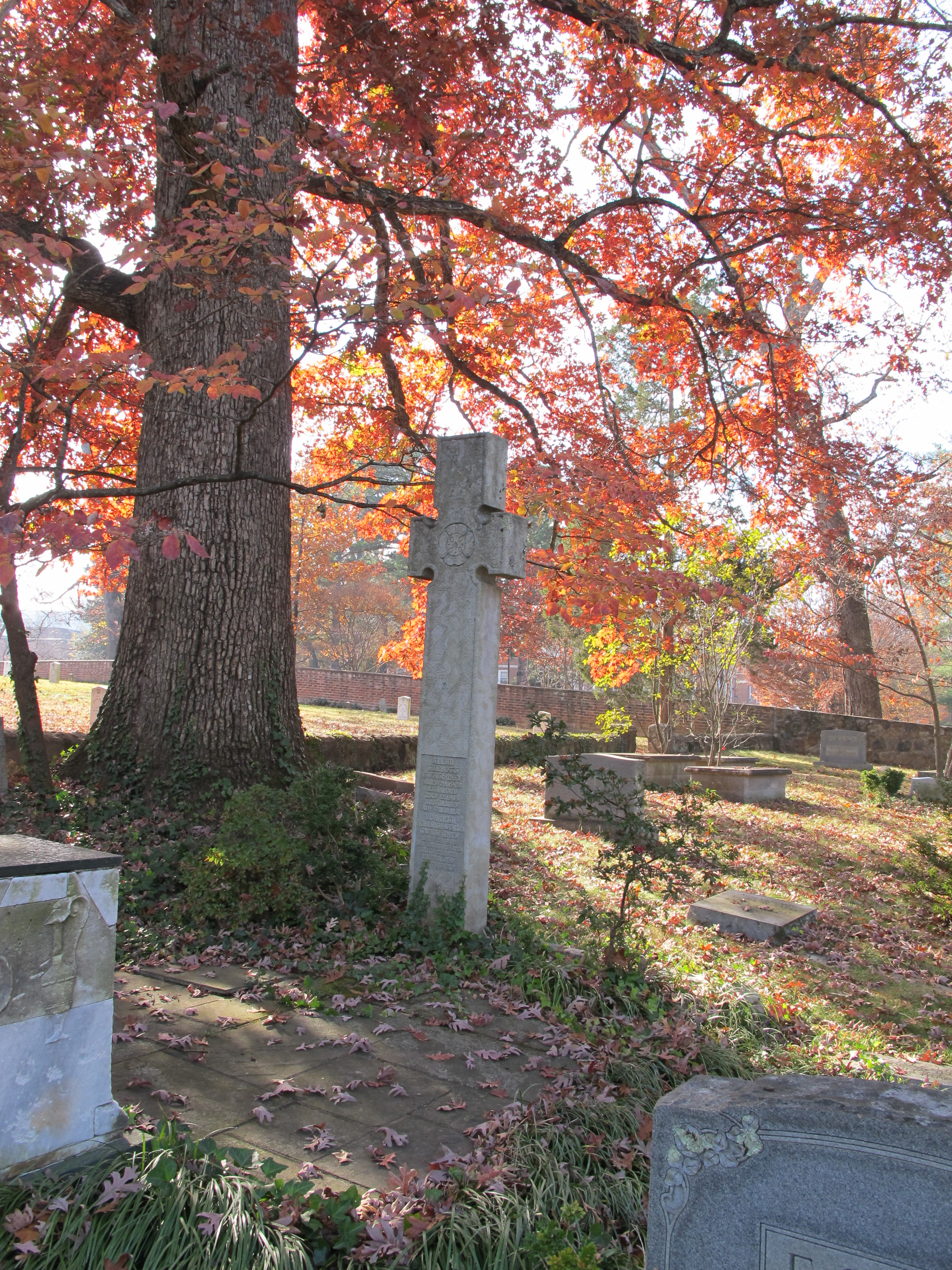
- Graves at the University of Virginia Cemetery
- Interactive map of University of Virginia Cemetery and Columbarium

Details
- Established: 1828
- Location: Charlottesville, Virginia
- Country: United States
- Coordinates: 38.0361°N 78.5127°W
- Owned by: University of Virginia
- Website: www.virginia.edu/uvacemetery/
- Find a Grave: University of Virginia Cemetery and Columbarium

The University of Virginia Cemetery and Columbarium is a cemetery on the grounds of the University of Virginia, located at the intersection of McCormick Road and Alderman Road. In operation since 1828, during the earliest days of the university, the cemetery is the final resting place for many University of Virginia professors, administrators, and alumni. It includes a large burial area that holds the remains of 1,097 Confederate States Army soldiers. The cemetery is in two sections; the newer section includes a columbarium to provide more space for burials.

== History ==
The first burial in what was to become the University of Virginia Cemetery was Henry William Tucker, younger brother of University professor George Tucker and the first victim of a typhoid fever outbreak at the university in 1828. Other typhoid victims followed. The cemetery also received victims of accidental death.

During the American Civil War, the cemetery received the bodies of many Confederate soldiers who died in the university hospital. Temporary wood markers were raised by the Ladies Confederate Memorial Association. The markers were replaced with more permanent ones, including a large stone statue of a Confederate soldier designed by sculptor Caspar Buberl, in 1893.

The final burial plots in the cemetery were sold in 1966. In 1987, the University of Virginia Board of Visitors approved the construction of a columbarium to receive cremated remains. The wall was completed in 1991, originally holding 180 vaults and now holding 360.

In November 2012, the university discovered a previously undocumented "black burial ground" outside the walls of the cemetery. It is believed that the burial ground may hold remains of emancipated workers, slaves, or both. In all, the burial ground was discovered to contain 67 graves.

== Notable burials ==
Notable individuals buried in the University Cemetery include:

- George Tucker, Virginia attorney, author, educator and politician
- William McCoy, Virginia politician
- William B. Spong Jr., United States senator
- Thomas S. Martin, Virginia politician
- Thomas J. Wertenbaker, historian
- William Holmes McGuffey, author, Ohio University president, and UVA professor
- Milton W. Humphreys, Confederate sergeant and UVA professor
- Carnot Posey, Confederate general and UVA law student
- Charles S. Venable, mathematician, astronomer, and UVA professor
- Henry "Pops" Lannigan, noted UVA coach
- Dumas Malone, historian, biographer and editor
- Paul Brandon Barringer, Virginia Tech president
- Jesse Beams, physicist who worked on the Manhattan Project
- Philip Alexander Bruce, historian
- John A. G. Davis, UVA law professor who was shot to death by a student
- M. Patton Echols, Virginia State Senator
- Edwin E. Floyd, mathematician
- George Garrett, Poet Laureate of Virginia
- Robert Kent Gooch, football player and track athlete
- Julia Gardiner Tyler Wilson, co-founder of Kappa Delta
- Ivey Foreman Lewis, botanist, geneticist, and dean of UVA
- John B. Minor, attorney and law professor
- Edward Slaughter, football player and coach
- James Southall Wilson, professor and founder of the Virginia Quarterly Review
- University of Virginia presidents Edwin Alderman, John Lloyd Newcomb, Edgar F. Shannon Jr., and Frank Hereford

Confederate general Turner Ashby was interred at the University of Virginia Cemetery after his death in 1862, but he was reinterred at the Stonewall Cemetery in Winchester, Virginia in 1866.
