= Frank Hereford (university president) =

American academic (1923-2004)

Frank Loucks Hereford Jr.
- Born: July 18, 1923; Lake Charles, Louisiana, U.S.
- Died: September 21, 2004 (aged 81); Charlottesville, Virginia, U.S.
- Resting place: University of Virginia Cemetery
- Education: Ph.D.
- Alma mater: University of Virginia
- Occupation: Educator
- Known for: President of the University of Virginia
- Term: 1974–1985
- Predecessor: Edgar F. Shannon Jr.
- Successor: Robert M. O'Neil

Frank Loucks Hereford Jr. (July 18, 1923 – September 21, 2004) was the president of the University of Virginia from 1974 to 1985. He died in 2004 at the age of 81. Among the hallmarks of his presidency were UVA's first major capital campaign, which increased the university's endowment from $97 million to more than $250 million; and ending the traditional Easters Weekend party.

== Biography ==
Hereford attended the University of Virginia as an undergraduate, where he wrote a sports column for College Topics (the precursor of The Cavalier Daily) and sang in the Virginia Glee Club. He received a B.A. in physics in 1943, became a physics fellow working under Jesse Beams after the war, and received his Ph.D. from the university. During the war years, he worked on research for the Manhattan Project with Dr. Beams, who called him "one of the best all around physicists with whom I have ever been associated."

He subsequently became a professor at the university, then became head of the Physics Department and dean of the Graduate School of Arts and Sciences in 1962. He was appointed provost in 1966. He was appointed vice-president of the university (one of five newly created VP-level offices) in 1970, but resigned his posts of vice-president and Dean to return to research in 1971. He was elected president to succeed Edgar Shannon in 1973 and took office a year later on the condition that he only serve for ten years; he extended his term by one year to oversee the completion of the university's first capital campaign, which began in 1981.

At the university as an undergraduate, Hereford was a member of Omicron Delta Kappa, T.I.L.K.A., and the Alpha Tau Omega social fraternity, as well as the Raven Society and Phi Beta Kappa. Upon his death, it was announced that Hereford had been a member of the Seven Society.

He was also a member of the whites-only Farmington Country Club. Where his predecessor Edgar F. Shannon Jr. had resigned from the club, Hereford stated that he preferred to remain and attempt to change the club from within. His membership caused controversy at the university in 1976, resulting in one faculty resignation. The incident became the catalyst for social change at the university including the establishment of an Office of Minority Affairs.

Hereford was a recipient of the Thomas Jefferson Award in 1966, and the Raven Award. The Hereford Residential College at UVA is named after him.
