= James Morris Page =

American mathematician (1864–1936)

- Born: March 4, 1864; Albemarle County, Virginia
- Died: March 18, 1936 (aged 72); Charlottesville, Virginia
- Title: Chairman of faculty (1903-1904); Professor of pure mathematics (1896-1934)

Academic background
- Education: PhD, Leipzig University; MA, Randolph–Macon College

Academic work
- Discipline: Mathematician
- Sub-discipline: Pure mathematics
- Institutions: University of Virginia

James Morris Page (born March 4, 1864 - March 18, 1936) was an American mathematician, dean and chairman of faculty of University of Virginia. He was the last chairman of the University of Virginia before the office was replaced by the presidency.

== Early life and education ==
James Morris Page was born in Albemarle County, Virginia on March 4, 1864. His parents were Thomas Walker Page and Nancy Watson Morris. He was a descendant of English settler John Page, and a relative of Walter Hines Page and Robert N. Page.

He graduated from Randolph–Macon College with a Master of Arts and subsequently served as assistant chair of mathematics. He received a Doctor of Philosophy degree from Leipzig University, graduating magna cum laude in 1887. During his time at Leipzig, he befriended and studied with Sophus Lie, Friedrich Engels, and Felix Klein.

== Academic career ==
Page returned to Virginia and founded the Keswick School in Cobham, Albemarle County, Virginia, where he taught for seven years. He returned to Europe to complete his work Differential Equations, published by Macmillan, in 1895.

He returned to the United States in 1896 and became a fellow and lecturer of Johns Hopkins University. He was made an adjunct professor of pure mathematics at University of Virginia in 1896 and later became full professor. Page was appointed chairman of UVA's faculty after the resignation of Paul Brandon Barringer in 1903, and served in that role until 1904 when the office was changed to a presidency. He was succeeded by Edwin Alderman, UVA's first president. He continued to teach mathematics at UVA until 1934.

== Later life ==
Page had six children, including Constance Page Daniel, the first woman to graduate from UVA's winter school. They lived in Charlottesville, Virginia near the university. He spoke several languages fluently, including German. After suffering a stroke, he began speaking in German instead of English. As his daughter Constance had studied German, she was able to communicate with him. He died in Charlottesville on March 18, 1936.
