= John Lloyd Newcomb =

American academic administrator (1881–1954)

- Born: December 18, 1881
- Died: February 22, 1954 (aged 72); Charlottesville, Virginia, United States
- Resting place: University of Virginia Cemetery
- Education: College of William and Mary; University of Virginia
- Occupation: Educator
- Known for: President of the University of Virginia
- Term: 1931-1947
- Predecessor: Edwin A. Alderman
- Successor: Colgate Darden

John Lloyd Newcomb (December 18, 1881 – February 22, 1954) was an American educator. He served as the second president of the University of Virginia, ascending to the position after the death of Edwin Alderman. Newcomb, a member of the engineering faculty of the university, oversaw the university through the Depression and the Second World War and managed its physical expansion, including the building of Scott Stadium, the Bayly Art Museum, and Alderman Library.

== Biography ==
Born December 18, 1881, in Sassafras, Gloucester County, Virginia, Newcomb received his B.A. from the College of William and Mary in 1900 and subsequently took a degree in Civil Engineering from the University of Virginia in 1903. While a student and after receiving his civil engineering degree he worked as a computer in the engineering office of the Rapid Transit Subway Construction Company in New York and as an engineer for the Norfolk and Southern Railway. Newcomb was appointed an adjunct professor of civil engineering in 1905 by the Board of Visitors of UVA. He became Edwin Alderman's assistant in 1926 and succeeded Alderman after the first UVA president died of complications from a stroke. He was confirmed in the position after nearly two years as acting president, despite his lack of national renown.

While president of the university, Newcomb received honorary degrees from Washington and Lee University (doctor of science, 1933) and from his alma mater, the College of William and Mary (LL.D. 1935).

He died on February 22, 1954. After his death, Newcomb was revealed to be a member of the Seven Society, the UVA secret society known for its gifts to and support of the university community. In 1958 the Seven Society donated $17,777.77 to establish a loan fund for faculty and students in Newcomb's honor.

An engineering professorship, the John Lloyd Newcomb Professor of Material Science and Engineering Physics, is endowed in Newcomb's memory, and the student union building at Virginia, Newcomb Hall, is named after him.

== Academic career ==
- 1905-1925 – Professor of Civil Engineering, University of Virginia (Charlottesville, Virginia)
- 1925-1931 – Dean of Engineering, University of Virginia
- 1926-1931 – Assistant to the President, University of Virginia
- 1931-1933 – Acting President, University of Virginia
- 1933-1947 – President of the University of Virginia
