= Charles S. Venable =

American mathematician, astronomer, and military officer (1827-1900)

Charles Scott Venable
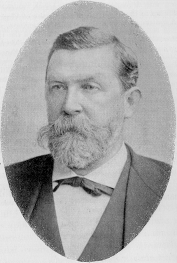
- Born: March 19, 1827; Prince Edward County, Virginia, U.S.
- Died: August 11, 1900 (aged 73); Charlottesville, Virginia, U.S.
- Burial place: University of Virginia Cemetery; Charlottesville, Virginia
- Military career
- Allegiance: Confederate States of America
- Branch: Confederate States Army
- Service years: 1861–65 (CSA)
- Rank: Lieutenant Colonel
- Conflicts: American Civil War
- Other work: Chairman of the Faculty, University of Virginia 1870–1873, 1886–1888

Charles Scott Venable (March 19, 1827 – August 11, 1900) was a mathematician, astronomer, and military officer. In mathematics, he is noted for authoring a series of publications as a University of Virginia professor.

== Early life ==
He was born at Longwood House in Farmville, Virginia, and graduated from Hampden–Sydney College, founded by his Patriot ancestor Nathaniel Venable, at the age of 15. He was a member of Beta Theta Pi fraternity while at Hampden-Sydney College.

== Career ==
For several years following his graduation, he served as a mathematics tutor at the college. He received further education at the University of Virginia as well as in Berlin and Bonn, Germany. He became a professor in mathematics and astronomy in Virginia and South Carolina.

Following the war, Venable resumed his career as an educator.

== Civil War ==
Venable was present at the firing on Fort Sumter in April 1861, serving as a lieutenant in the South Carolina state militia. He then fought as a private in Company A, 2nd South Carolina Infantry. In the spring of 1862, Venable joined the staff of presidential military advisor General Robert E. Lee as an aide-de-camp with the rank of major. He continued serving on Lee's staff when the general took command of the Army of Northern Virginia on June 1, 1862. He served on Lee's staff from the Peninsula Campaign to Appomattox Court House and was promoted to lieutenant colonel.

According to family legend (and some history books) Lee called Venable "Faithful old Venable."

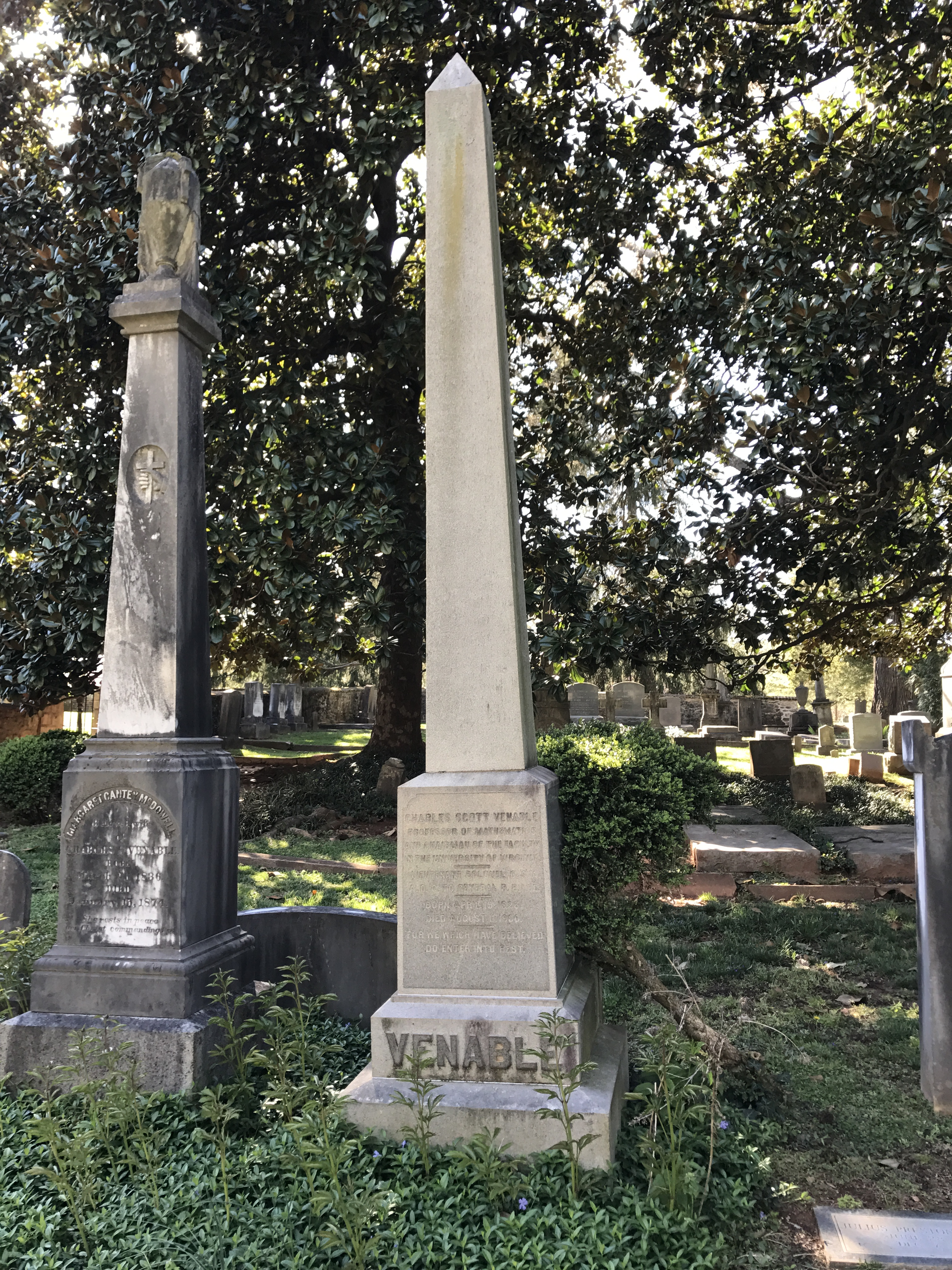
Venable's gravestone at the University of Virginia Cemetery in Charlottesville, Virginia.

== Personal life ==
Following the war, Venable resumed his career as an educator. During a visit to Prussia, he was invited to the castle of Heros von Borcke, the former aide-de-camp to General J.E.B. Stuart.

Venable died in Charlottesville in 1900. He was buried at the University of Virginia Cemetery in Charlottesville.

== Legacy ==
Venable Elementary School opened in 1925 near the University of Virginia. In December 2022, the Charlottesville City Public Schools Naming of Facilities Committee recommended changing the school name to Trailblazer Elementary. In September 2024, the name was officially changed.
