= University of Virginia College of Arts and Sciences =

University of Virginia College and Graduate School of Arts and Sciences
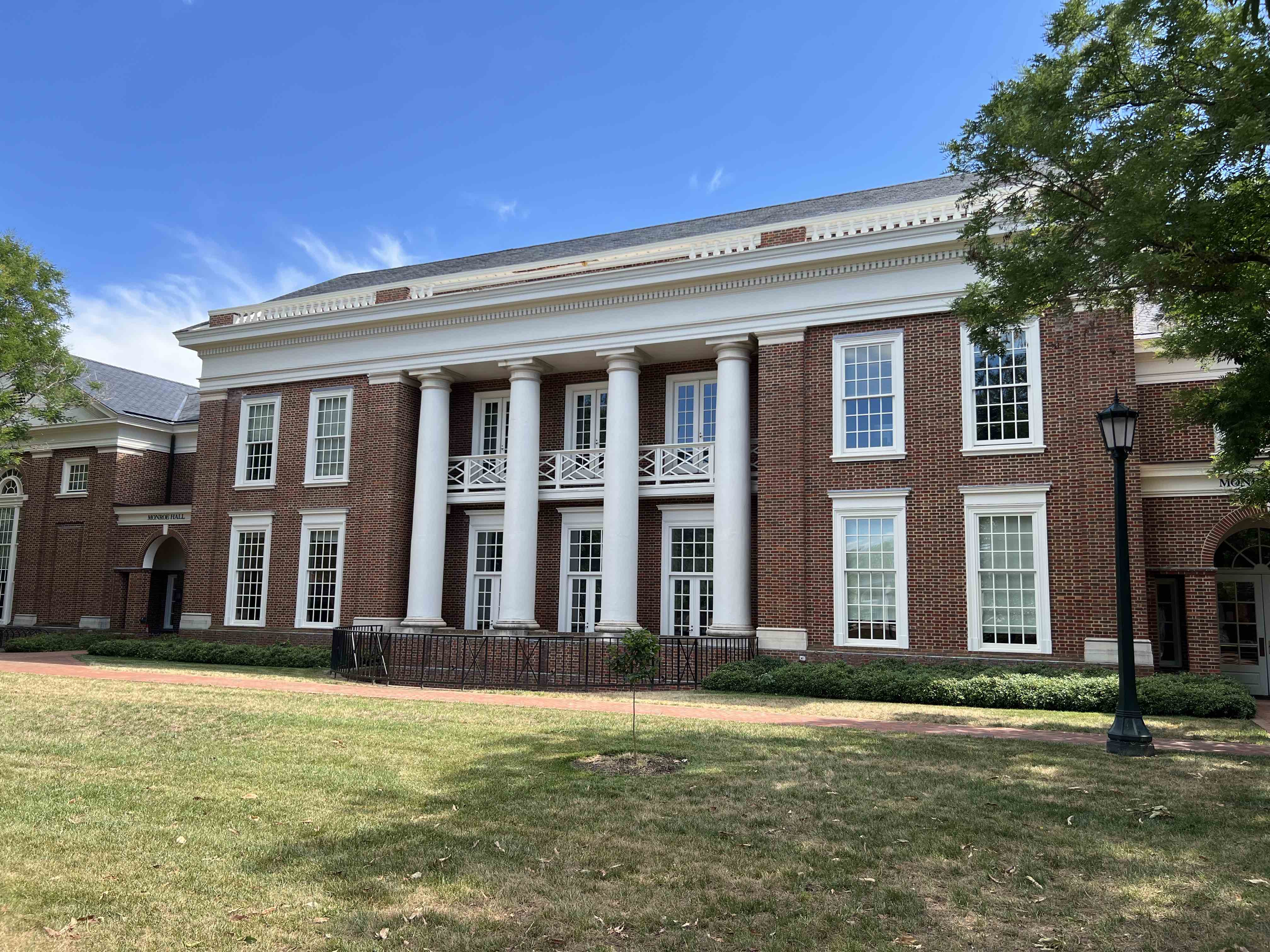
- Monroe Hall, main home of the College
- Type: Public charter, Private and Public funding
- Established: 1824; 202 years ago
- Dean: Christa Acampora
- Students: 12,000
- Location: Charlottesville, Virginia, U.S., USA; 38°2′5.1″N 78°30′22.5″W
- Campus: University town
- Website: as.virginia.edu

The University of Virginia College of Arts & Sciences is the largest of the University of Virginia's ten schools. Consisting of both a graduate and an undergraduate program, the college comprises the liberal arts and humanities section of the university.

Edward Ayers was the dean of the college through July 1, 2007, when he was named the ninth President of the University of Richmond; Karen L. Ryan was named Interim Dean after his departure, and Meredith Jung-En Woo became dean on June 1, 2008. The College (as it is called at UVA) offers more than 45 undergraduate majors and more than 24 graduate programs. On July 1, 2014, Ian Baucom began his tenure as the Buckner W. Clay Dean of the College and Graduate School of Arts & Sciences after serving 17 years in Duke University's Department of English. Dean Baucom was a professor of English and directed the John Hope Franklin Humanities Institute at Duke.

== History ==
The College of Arts & Sciences, first named the "academic department" was authorized by the board of visitors in 1824 along with the School of Law and the School of Medicine. Classes first conferred in March 1825. Under the presidency of Edwin Alderman, the department was officially separated into the "College of Arts and Sciences" and the "Graduate School of Arts and Sciences", and was substantially expanded, including the founding of departments of music and fine arts (funded through a gift by University benefactor Paul Goodloe McIntire).

In 1969, the Board of Visitors voted to lift all of the restrictions regarding the admission of women to the college. In September 1970 the first class of undergraduate women entered the College of Arts & Sciences at U.Va.

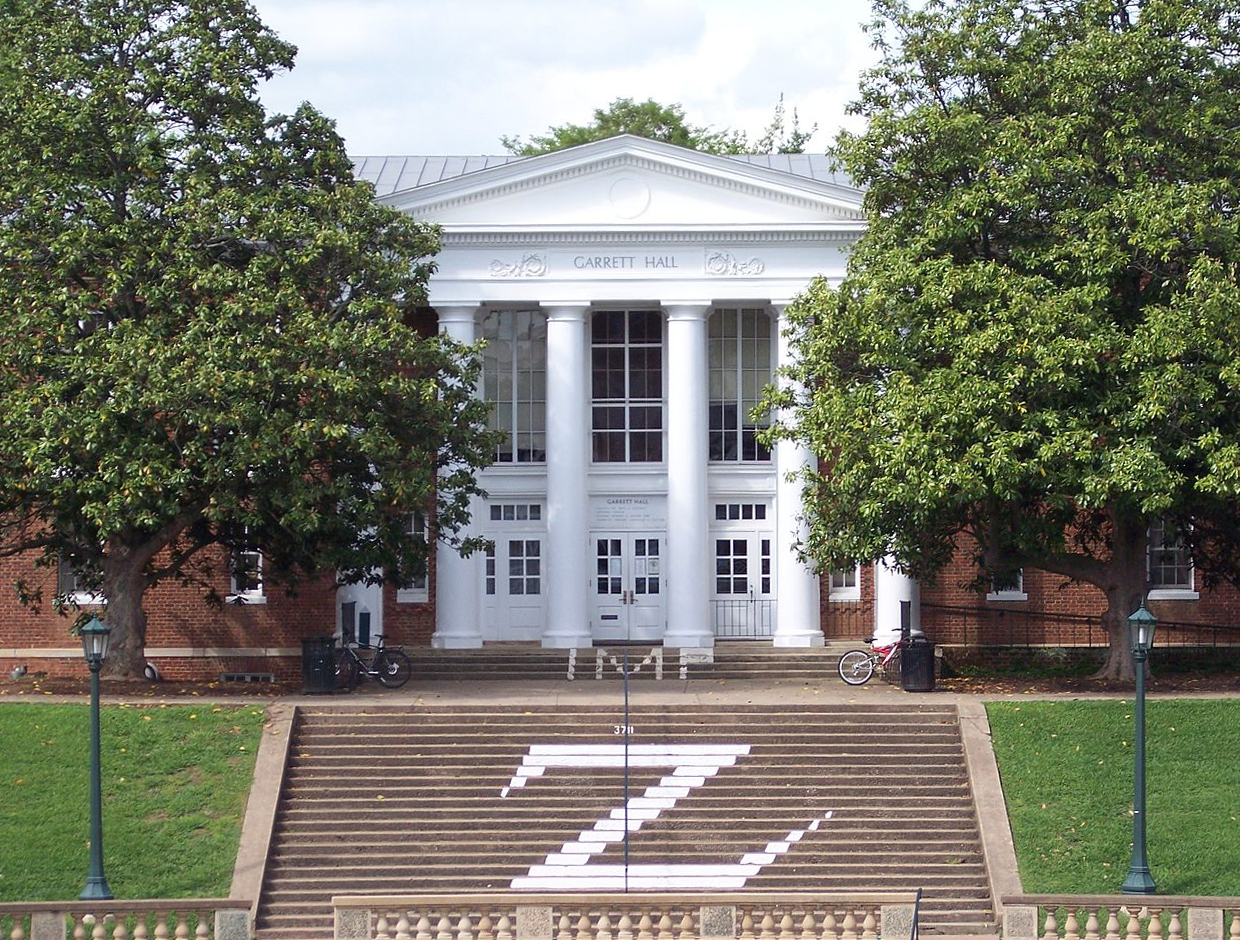
Garrett Hall, the former home to the CLAS. In 2009 the offices were moved to Monroe Hall.

== Academics ==
The college enrolls approx. 12,000 students undergraduate and 5,000 graduate students in over 55 fields. For the class entering 2007, 18,048 students applied and 6,274 were offered admission with 3,260 accepting admittance into the college. 88% of the enrolling students ranked in the top 10th of their graduating classes.

=== Echols Scholars ===
The Echols Scholars program was created in 1960 as an answer to the soaring numbers introduced by the GI Bill. The Faculty Senate decided to create a program that would provide "ambitious academic privileges to students". The program was designed to attract applicants deemed by the admissions committee to comprise the very top academic echelon of the prospective incoming class; the significant academic freedoms and other benefits afforded the small selection of applicants honored with the offer of an Echols Scholarship was meant to entice students likely to be accepted into Ivy League and other top schools to choose UVA in their stead. These privileges include living in an exclusive dorm first year, exemption from area requirements, an exclusive counseling program, an interdisciplinary major, and others. Echols Scholars are not selected through a separate admissions application process; rather, all applicants are automatically reviewed for Echols status during the general admissions process. For enrolled students not originally accepted with the Echols distinction, the school offers an additional first-year application program in which students enrolled in challenging classes are invited to apply. If accepted, they are then allowed to join the Echols Scholars Program for the rest of their tenure at the university.

The current dean of the Echols Scholars Program is Dr. Sarah Cole.

=== Departments ===
- African and African American studies
- American studies
- Anthropology
- Astronomy
- Art
- Biology
- Chemistry
- Classics
- Cognitive Science
- Computer Science
- Drama
- East Asian Languages, Literatures, and Cultures
- Economics
- English and American Literature and Language
- Environmental Science
- French Language and Literature
- Germanic Languages and Literatures
- History
- Human biology
- Mathematics
- Media Studies
- Middle Eastern and South Asian Languages and Cultures
- Music
- Philosophy
- Physics
- Politics
- Psychology
- Religious Studies
- Slavic Languages and Literatures
- Sociology
- Spanish, Italian, and Portuguese
- Statistics

In addition to majors and (typically) minors being available in the above-listed fields of study, the college also administers interdisciplinary degree programs in the following areas:

- Environmental science and Public Policy
- Environmental Thought and Practice (ETP)
- Jewish Studies
- Medieval Studies
- Political philosophy, Policy, and Law
- Political and Social thought
- Studies of Women, Gender, and Sexuality

There is also a 5-year program, by arrangement with the School Education and Human Development, through which students who graduate the college with a BA degree may pursue a Master of Arts in Teaching degree at the School of Education and Human Development with one additional year of graduate study.

==== Department notabilities ====
Several of the 45+ departments, along with their faculty, have been noted for important contributions to their fields. Numerous members of the Department of English, which includes the top-ranked Program in Creative Writing, have distinguished themselves nationally and internationally, most notably Pulitzer Prize for Poetry recipient Rita Dove, on the faculty since 1989, who served as United States Poet Laureate from 1993 to 1995 and has garnered numerous honors, among them the 1996 National Humanities Medal, the 2009 Fulbright Lifetime Achievement Medal, 24 honorary doctorates and the 2011 National Medal of Arts. Dr. James Galloway, head of the Environmental Science department, received the Tyler Prize for Environmental Achievement Award on March 27, 2008. The History department's Virginia Center for Digital History was awarded a Digital Humanities start-up grant under the National Endowment for the Humanities' "We the People" program. Also of the History Department is White Burkett Miller Professor of History Philip Zelikow, who is currently serving on President Obama's Intelligence Advisory Board James Landers, a professor in chemistry and microbiology, has been recognized with the 2008 Innovation Award from the Association for Laboratory Automation. Many more recognitions, from sources such as the National Science Foundation, are awarded to individual students for their academic and research achievements in their respective fields.

=== Rankings ===
The English graduate department was recently ranked #4 in the country according to the National Research Council rankings and #12 according to U.S. News & World Report. Similarly, the physics graduate department and the neuroscience graduate program were both ranked 14th and the history graduate department 19th. The philosophy graduate program is ranked 32nd in the United States. The economics and psychology graduate departments were ranked 27th and 28th, respectively.

== Centers and Institutes ==
- Anheuser Busch Coastal Research Center
- Blandy Experimental Farm
- Carter G. Woodson Institute for African-American and African Studies
- Center for Biomathematical Technology
- Center for Biomedical Ethics
- Center for Global Health
- Center for Politics
- Institute for Advanced Studies in Culture
- Institute for Advanced Technology in the Humanities
- Institute for Nuclear and Particle Physics
- Institute for Practical Ethics and Public Life
- Institute for Public History
- Leander McCormick Observatory
- Miller Center of Public Affairs
- Mountain Lake Biological Station
- Rare Book School (Book Arts Press)
- Thomas Jefferson Center for Studies in Political Economy
- Virginia Astronomical Instrumentation Laboratory
- Virginia Center for Digital History
- Virginia Foundation for the Humanities
- Virginia Institute for Theoretical Astrophysics

== Notable alumni ==
- George Allen (CLAS '74), former U.S. Senator and former governor of Virginia
- Julia Gibbons (CLAS '75) U.S. District Judge, Sixth Circuit Court of Appeals
- Larry J. Sabato (CLAS '74) Director and founder, University of Virginia Center for Politics; best-selling author, Feeding Frenzy: Attack Journalism & American Politics.
- Samuel Goldwyn, Jr. (CLAS '47) CEO, Samuel Goldwyn Co.; former president, MGM
- Tina Fey (CLAS '92) Actress, former Saturday Night Live head writer; wrote, executive-produced, and starred as Liz Lemon in NBC's 30 Rock.
- Benjamin McKenzie (CLAS '01) Actor, The O.C
- Sean Patrick Thomas (CLAS '92) Actor, Save the Last Dance, Courage Under Fire, Barbershop
- Heath Miller (CLAS '05) Tight End, Pittsburgh Steelers, Super Bowl Winner 2006
- Katherine A. Couric (CLAS '79) Anchor, CBS Nightly News. She has been co-anchor of NBC's Today Show from 1991 through 2006.
- Brit Hume (CLAS '65) Anchor of Special Report with Brit Hume, Managing Editor Fox News

== See also ==
- College of arts and sciences
