= John A. G. Davis =

Professor at the University of Virginia School of Law

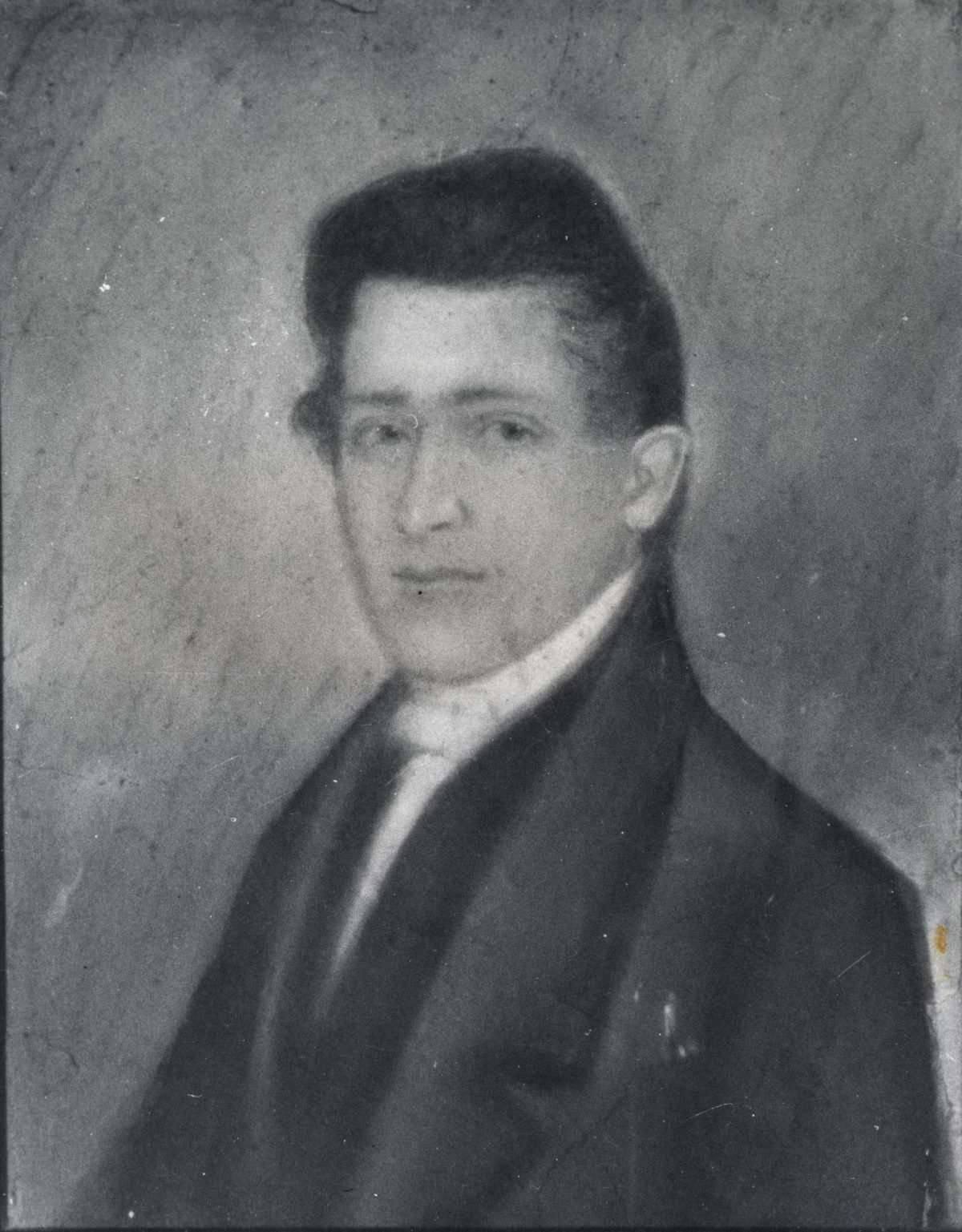
John A. G. Davis

John Anthony Gardner Davis (March 5, 1802, in Middlesex County, Virginia – November 15, 1840, in Charlottesville, Virginia) was a professor at the University of Virginia School of Law who was shot to death by a student of the university.

== Early life ==
Davis, the son of Staige Davis (1775–1813) and Elizabeth Macon (Gardner) Davis (born 1780) of Prospect Hill in Middlesex County, was named John Anthony Gardner Davis after his mother's uncle, Dr. Anthony Gardner.

From 1819 to 1820, Davis studied at the College of William & Mary, where the president called him "likely to be the most distinguished man of his time, in Virginia."

In 1821, Davis married Mary Jane Terrell (1803–1879), a great niece of Thomas Jefferson.

Davis was admitted to the bar in 1822 and opened a law practice in Middlesex County. The couple moved to Charlottesville in 1824, where they constructed a residence at Lewis Farm which is now on the National Register of Historic Places, and where Davis continued to practice law.

Believing that lawyers needed a broad education, Davis studied science during the first session of the University of Virginia in 1825; in 1830 he was elected the second professor of law at the university, and became the first of several law professors to reside in Pavilion X on The Lawn.

Davis and his wife had seven children: Eugene, John Staige, Dabney Carr T., Richard Terrell, Caryetta, Elizabeth Gardiner, and Lucy Minor Davis. All of the sons attended University of Virginia.

== Academic work ==
Davis wrote A Treatise on Criminal Law: With an Exposition of the Office and Authority of Justices of the Peace in Virginia, including Forms of Practice. He divided the School of Law into a junior class, which covered general material, and a senior class, which focused on the tools needed to practice law professionally. The Law Society was created under his aegis in 1833.

Characteristic of Professor Davis was the blended tact and benignity which marked his intercourse with his students, and that paternal interest he manifested, especially, but by no means exclusively, to those in his class. In sickness they were often removed to his house, and nourished with tenderest care. In their troubles, he was a sympathizing and judicious advisor.

— The Alumni Bulletin of the University of Virginia, 1895

== Death ==
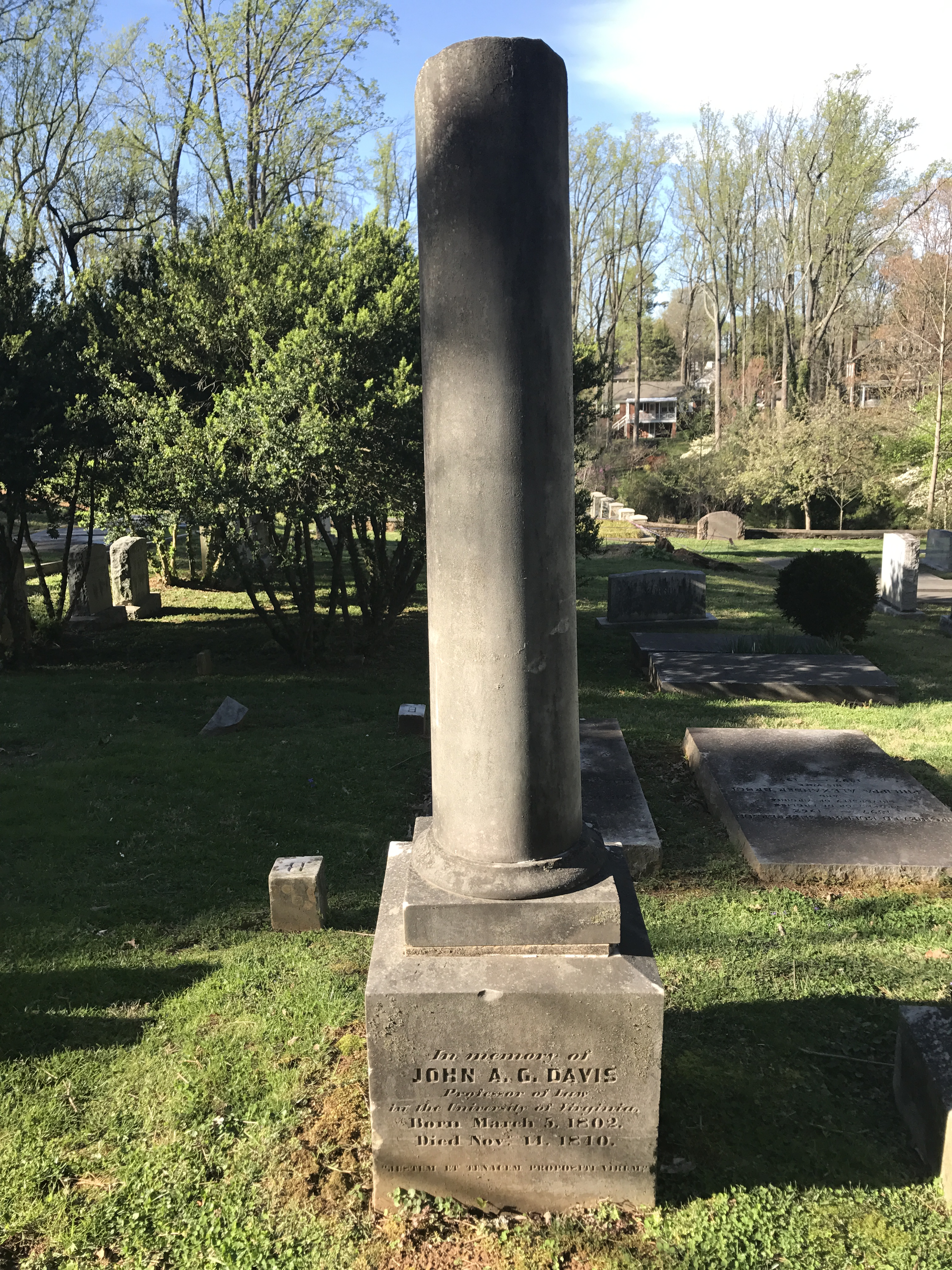
Davis's gravestone at the University of Virginia Cemetery in Charlottesville, Virginia.

At the time, a fixture at University of Virginia were the periodic student riots, one of which occurred on the evening of 12 November 1840. By now chairman of the faculty, respected and well liked by the students, Davis attempted to stop the two students who were causing the disturbance and was shot by one. The masked perpetrator was identified as Joseph Green Semmes.

Davis stepped up to him [e.g., Semmes] & caught hold of his disguise in order to detect him, as he was committing a high infringement of the laws of good order of the Institution. The person however jerked away from him, ran three or four yards, wheeled around, and fired his pistol at Mr. Davis–He then fled as fast as possible past Mr. Davis' pavilion, jumped down a wall that bounds the southern side of the University & escaped.

— Davis's nephew, Peter Carr

Although the wound was originally not considered fatal, Davis died three days later. He was buried at the University of Virginia Cemetery. Students, chastened by the turn of events, joined in the search for Semmes and located him hiding in the forest. Semmes was imprisoned in the county jail for several months while several trial dates were postponed; then, in July 1841, released on $25,000 bond, by reason of deteriorating health. However, he failed to appear for trial in October 1841, and eventually committed suicide, years later.

Young Semmes, who some years since shot Professor Davis at the Virginia University, brought his life to an end by his own hand, the morning of the 9th instant [9 July 1847], at the house of his brother in Washington, Georgia. He shot himself with a pistol, the ball entering the left eye and penetrating the brain and lingered in a state of total insensibility from about 7 o'clock, A. M., when his family was called to his room by the report of a pistol, until half past 1. P. M. of the same day.

— Edgefield Advertiser (SC), 11 August 1847

== Popular culture ==
A fictionalized version of Davis' murder is portrayed in the short story, The Professor's Assassin, by Matthew Pearl.

== See also ==
- List of school shootings in the United States by death toll
