= O.W.L. Society =

Secret society at University of Virginia

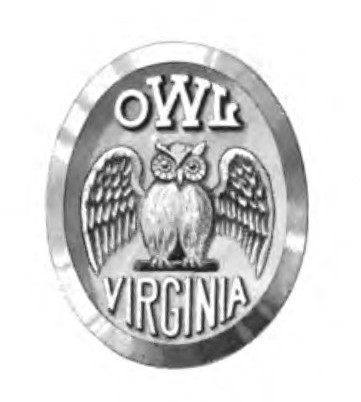
- Founded: 1887; 139 years ago–1930 ?; 2013; University of Virginia
- Type: Secret
- Affiliation: Independent
- Status: Active
- Emphasis: Literary arts
- Scope: Local
- Motto: De mortuis nil nisi bonum "Nothing but good about things past" or "Of the dead, nothing unless good." La nuit porte conseil "The night brings sound counsel."
- Publication: Corks and Curls
- Chapters: 1
- Headquarters: Charlottesville, Virginia; United States

The O.W.L. Society, also known as the O.W.L. Club, was founded in 1887 at the University of Virginia as a secret society devoted to the literary arts. Founded in 1887, the O.W.L. Society is the oldest secret society existing at the university today, though it has not been in continuous existence since its founding.

== Early history ==
Established in 1887, the original O.W.L. Club appears to have been a social group of influential University of Virginia students. Among the society's founders was Thomas Longstreet Wood, a student active in literary pursuits, who later went on to publish Arcade Echoes, a compilation of the best student writing during his time at the university.

It was classified as a ribbon society, similar to Eli Banana and T.I.L.K.A., with which it shared a substantial number of common members. The O.W.L. also included many members of prominent fraternities, such as Delta Kappa Epsilon. The O.W.L. was accordingly regarded in fairly high respect, and definitely as a “good thing,” as the students of the day called something they approved of. Of the ribbon societies, the 1895 edition of the university's annual, Corks and Curls, ranked the O.W.L. just below Eli Banana and T.I.L.K.A. in terms of social prominence, and highly in terms of academic performance.

The O.W.L. members were identified in the Corks and Curls yearbook, but its proceedings, membership selection, and other activities were kept secret. The society operated on a single ball system in membership proceedings, that is, one vote in the negative from any member was sufficient to exclude a candidate from the Society. The Society remained small, never including more than eight members at one time.

On January 19, 1894, O.W.L reformed “in order to promote the literary spirit not merely in a narrow circle but in the whole College, the constitution was amended and the qualification for membership made honorary.” The society transformed from a social organization to one with both social and practical functions. Its membership was drawn from the ranks of editors of important University publications, including the Virginia University Magazine, College Topics, and Corks and Curls.

=== Dissolution ===
The O.W.L. began to fade from University life in the early 1920s, and several brief attempts were made to revive the O.W.L. as a purely functional organization. In 1923, College Topics reported that the O.W.L. had “reorganized” and merged with Sigma Delta Chi, formerly the university's chapter of the national journalistic fraternity. College Topics noted that the new organization would “[act] as an unofficial group of students interested in student publications, gathered for the purpose of encouraging all journalistic activities at the University of Virginia.”

In 1928, the O.W.L. was again resurrected, this time with the purpose of sponsoring the satirical student publication known as The Yellow Journal, which was then facing considerable criticism from faculty and students for its practice of anonymous publication. During the years 1929 and 1930, the masthead of the Yellow Journal read, in part, “Sponsored by the OWLS (the damned fools).” After 1930, the O.W.L. was no longer mentioned in the masthead, and the journal ceased publication entirely in 1934.

The reason for the O.W.L.’s disappearance remains unclear, although numerous theories abound. One theory, published in the Cavalier Daily in 1968, asserts that the O.W.L. may have become what is now known as the Seven Society. The article suggests that the members of the O.W.L., taking to heart University President Edwin Alderman’s admonition that a more “beneficial” secret society be formed on grounds, began operating in greater secrecy under a new title. As the new organization gained prominence, the O.W.L. gradually became less relevant and was discontinued. The Seven Society's first public announcement, in 1915, coincided with the O.W.L.’s changing its heading in Corks and Curls from a secret society to a club. However, no hard evidence is known to exist to support this theory.

More likely, is that a combination of student apathy, increasing pressure from other social organizations, and financial hardship brought on by the Great Depression combined to cause the Society’s collapse. However, its demise also coincided with university funding of student organizations, reducing the need for one of O.W.L.'s primary functions.

=== Reorganization ===
On October 19, 2013, The O.W.L. Society announced its reorganization through a framed letter placed in three places: at the foot of the Aviator Statue outside Clemons Library, inside of Alderman Library, and in the mural hall of Clark Library. The letter stated, "We resurrect the O.W.L. to support, cultivate and enrich literary culture at the University of Virginia. We seek to recognize those who make excellent contributions to the literary life of the University of Virginia, to support their efforts, and to enliven the literary culture at the University." The group also sent an email stating that its reformation was stimulated Corks & Curls ceasing publication in 2009 and The Cavalier Daily going to a twice-weekly schedule.

== Symbols and traditions ==
In 1906, the society had two mottos, one Latin and one French. Its Latin motto is "De mortuis nil nisi bonum" which is translated as “Nothing but good about things past” or “Of the dead, nothing unless good.” In French, the motto is “La nuit porte conseil” which is translated as “The night brings sound counsel.”

== Activities ==
The O.W.L. Society presents faculty with a teaching award for "distinguished teaching of the written word at the University of Virginia".

== Membership ==
Historically, the society's members were editors of student publications; however, it no longer limits its members to this group.

== Notable members ==
Notable members of the O.W.L. include:

- Hugh S. Cumming Jr., United States Ambassador to Indonesia
- Armistead Mason Dobie, Dean of the University of Virginia School of Law and judge with the United States Court of Appeals for the Fourth Circuit, and the United States District Court for the Western District of Virginia
- Richard Thomas Walker Duke, United States House of Representatives
- John W. Fishburne, United States House of Representatives
- Samuel M. Kootz, New York City art dealer and author
- James Rogers McConnell, member of the Lafayette Escadrille
- George A. Paddock, United States House of Representatives
- James P. C. Southall, physicist and professor at Columbia University
- Oscar Underwood, Senate Minority Leader and House Majority Leader
- Charles Wertenbaker, journalist with Time
- Thomas J. Wertenbaker, historian and Edwards Professor of American History at Princeton University
- Langbourne Meade Williams Jr., president of Freeport-Texas

== See also ==
- Secret societies at the University of Virginia
- Collegiate secret societies in North America
