= Ernest Mead =

American academic (1918–2014)

Ernest Campbell Mead Jr. (June 13, 1918 – February 13, 2014) was professor of music and former head of the McIntire Department of Music at the University of Virginia.

Born at Richmond in 1918, Mead was interested in music as a child, studying with the composer John Powell in Richmond. When he arrived at the University of Virginia, he brought with him a Steinway piano. While a student at the university, he was a member of the Virginia Glee Club. Mead graduated from the University of Virginia in 1940 with a major in music, German language and literature.

He went on to Harvard University to earn his Ph.D. Mead's musical research focused on instrumental ensembles; his doctoral dissertation focused on the instrumental works of Girolamo Frescobaldi. He returned to the University of Virginia in 1953 as a professor.

As chairman of the McIntire School of Music in the University of Virginia College of Arts and Sciences, Mead was instrumental in securing donations to establish the U.Va. Music Library. He also worked with University professor Walter Ross to re-establish a university orchestra in 1967, now called the Charlottesville and University Symphony Orchestra. His office in the university's Old Cabell Hall was famous for its position "beneath the truth," that is, under the words "the truth" in the carving on the pediment, "You shall know the truth and the truth shall set you free." He retired from active teaching in 1996.

From 1972 on, Mead taught a liberal arts seminar at the university, continuing into his retirement. Friends of Mead established the Mead Endowment to "continue his legacy of faculty-student interaction" He is a recipient of numerous University awards, including the faculty awards of the IMP Society, Z Society, and Raven Society; the Gilbert J. Sullivan Distinguished Service Award from the Virginia Glee Club Alumni & Friends Association; and the university's Thomas Jefferson Award "for advancing, through his character, work, and personal example, the ideals and objectives for which Jefferson founded the University." Upon his death, it was revealed that he was a member of the Seven Society.

Mead died at Charlottesville on February 13, 2014, aged 95.
