= Charles Greenleaf Bell =

American author and scholar

Charles Greenleaf Bell (October 31, 1916 – December 25, 2010) commonly known as Charles G. Bell, was a scholar, poet and writer.

== Education ==
He earned a bachelor's degree in physics from the University of Virginia in 1936. He won a 1938–39 Rhodes Scholarship to the University of Oxford, earning two bachelor's degrees and a master's degree. Among his other awards and honors are the Rockefeller post-war fellow in 1948, the Ford Foundation fellow in 1952–3, and the Fulbright fellow. Bell was a member of Phi Beta Kappa and the Raven Society.

== Career ==
He taught English at Blackburn College from 1939 to 1940 and English and then physics at Iowa State University from 1940 to 1945. Bell was assistant professor of humanities at the University of Chicago until 1956. He became a Fulbright professor at Technische Hockschule in Munich. Bell taught at St. John's College in Maryland until 1967, and was a tutor and director of graduate programs from 1972 to 1973 at St. John's College in New Mexico.

He was script writer for the film The Spirit of Rome (1964) and script advisor for the film Ingenium Romae (1969), both made for Encyclopedia Britannica.

A major work was Symbolic History Through Sight and Sound, a 60-hour video cultural history of the world, made between 1970 and 1990. Many excerpts are on YouTube.

Bell worked as a lecturer at several other colleges such as Black Mountain College, the University of Rochester, and at the Springfield Public Library. Also, Bell has served as a guest professor at the University of Frankfurt in Germany, the State University of New York, and the University of Puerto Rico in Mayaguez.

The Kahler-Kreis group of intellectuals was named so by Charles Greenleaf Bell.

== Personal life ==
Bell was married firstly to Mildred Cheatham (later surnamed MacKenzie with her second husband) with whom he had three children, Nona, Charlotte, Delia. His second wife was Diana Mason, (known to her family and friends by the nickname 'Danny') she was the granddaughter of Sir John Middlemore, MP, they had two daughters, Carola Middlemore Bell and Sandra Bell. In 2006, he moved to Maine to live with his daughter, where at the age of ninety-two he was still writing, working on a manuscript entitled Poetry and Translation. He died on December 25, 2010. He was the nephew-in-law of Amphilis Throckmorton Middlemore, grandson-in-law of MP Sir John Middlemore and great nephew-in-law of Thomas Middlemore.

== Major works ==
- Songs for a New America (1953)
- Delta Return (1956)
- The Married Land (1962)
- The Half Gods (1968)
- Five Chambered Heart (1986)
- Millennial Harvest: The Life And Collected Poems of Charles Greenleaf Bell (2006)
