= The 21 Society =

Secret society of the University of Virginia, US

- Founded: June 21, 1999; 26 years ago University of Virginia
- Type: Secret
- Affiliation: Independent
- Status: Active
- Scope: Local
- Chapters: 1
- Headquarters: Charlottesville, Virginia; United States

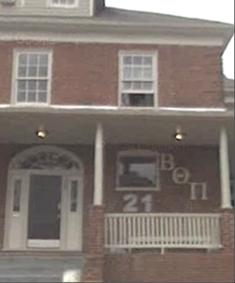
The Fraternity House of Beta Theta Pi with the mark of The 21 Society.

The 21 Society is a secret society at the University of Virginia, which announced its founding on June 21, 1999, citing "direct challenge(s) to student self-governance" and wanting to unify students to engage with the challenges of the 21st century. Since its inception, the 21 Society has contributed philanthropically to a variety of groups, including the Center for Politics and corporate sponsorship of charitable causes organized by students. The group has occasionally offered politically oriented messages centering on issues of student self-governance and the promotion of the university's honor system. Like other Secret societies at the University of Virginia, the 21 Society paints its "mark," a large "21," around the university grounds, such as fraternity and sorority houses.

== Recognition ==
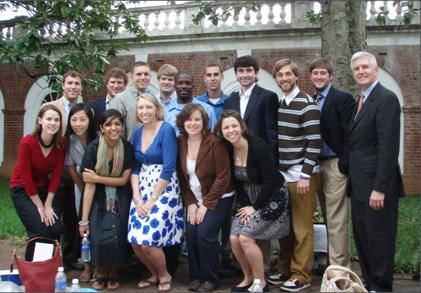
Dean of Students with students recognized by The 21 Society.

Like other secret societies at the university, The 21 Society routinely recognizes members of the community for their contributions to the university. A speaker is generally invited to address the class in a reception. Twenty-one fourth-year students are recognized annually “for quietly serving this university, improving it in character and in name through persistent action.” Speakers in the past have included Allen Groves, dean of students, Leonard Sandridge, former EVP/COO, and Marcia Pentz from the McIntire School of Commerce. Graduates of various schools of the university, such as the School of Law, have also been recognized in this annual ceremony. In addition to its ceremony for graduating students, the 21 Society has held recognition ceremonies for outstanding second-year undergraduate students and has sponsored events recognizing employees of the university. The society recognizes community members in other ways, including private letters.

== Membership ==
Little is known about the membership of the 21 Society. The group is said to be a “fully secret” society whose members are not revealed until their deaths, similar to the Seven Society. To date, no members have ever been officially revealed publicly through death or otherwise.

== Projects ==
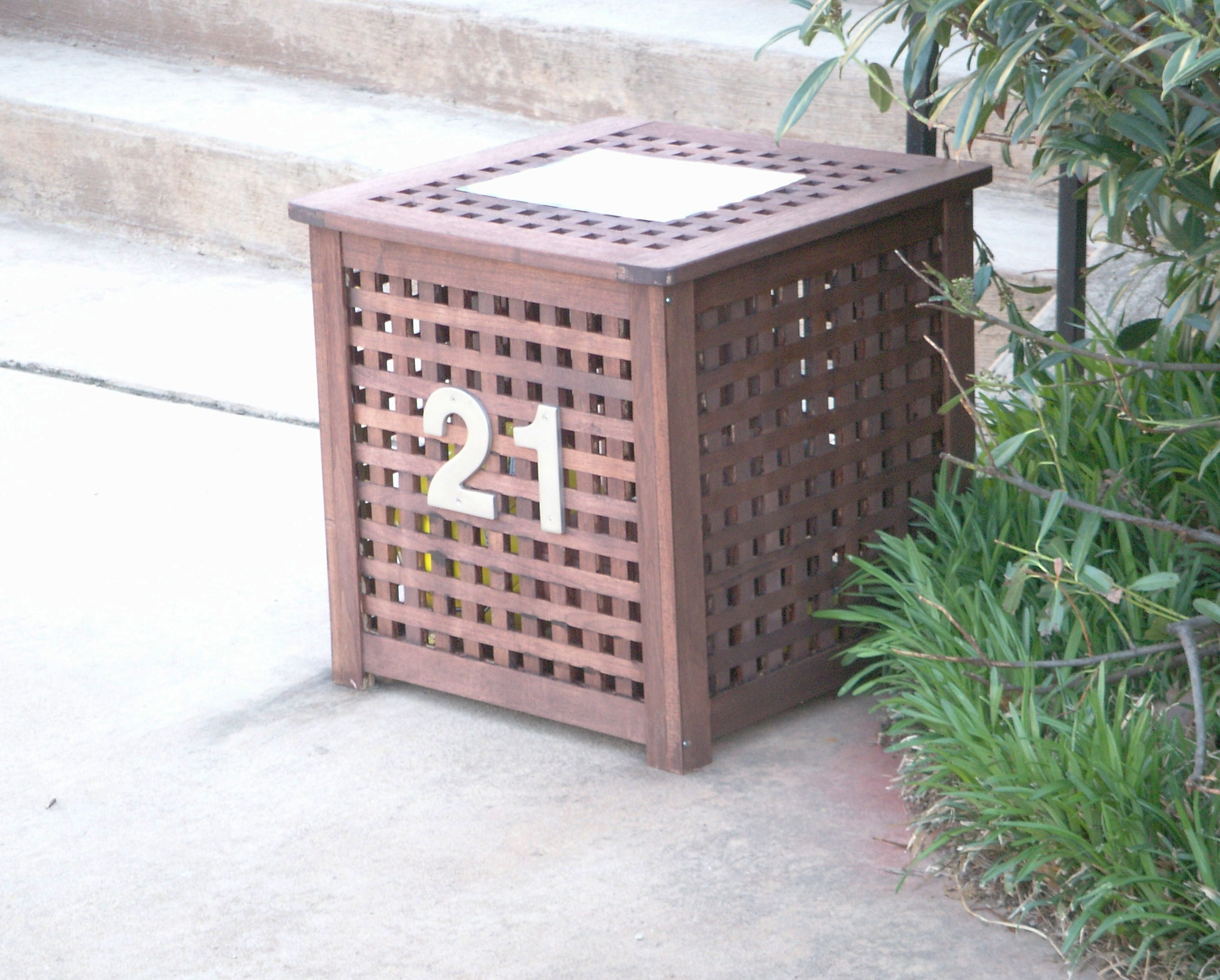
One of the 21 Society's boxes of sporting goods for students and visitors.

Its projects have been diverse, particularly with respect to student life. For example, in 2004, The 21 Society began placing containers on the Lawn and the "quad" areas of the university filled with footballs, soccer balls, and flying discs for use by visitors and students. The signs bore plaques encouraging free use of these items under the university's honor system. In 2009, the society made available to students a box of copies of the forms required for adding or dropping classes after the undergraduate registrar posted a sign indicating students would no longer receive free copies of such forms.

== See also ==
- Secret societies at the University of Virginia
- University of Virginia
- Collegiate secret societies in North America
