= University of Virginia secret societies =

Secret societies have been a part of University of Virginia student life since the first class of students in 1825. While the number of societies peaked during the 75 years between 1875 and 1950, there are several newer societies and seven societies that have been active for more than 100 years, including Seven Society, Z Society, IMP Society, and Eli Banana. The earliest societies, Eli Banana and T.I.L.K.A. Society, function as social clubs. In contrast, the Z Society, IMP Society, and Seven Society have a record of philanthropy and contribution to the university. Some of the more recent societies focus on the recognition or disapprobation of positive and negative contributions to the university.

== History ==
The earliest secret society at the university was probably the no-longer-secret Jefferson Literary and Debating Society, which at its 1825 founding was secret, with expulsion the penalty to any member who exposed the society's secrets. Student society activity for the first period of the university appears to have been confined to similar literary societies, including the Patrick Henry Society, Philomathean Society, Parthenon Society, Columbian, and Washington Society, which were not secret societies; only the last is still active.

At the same time, Greek organizations that were purely social in function (today's fraternities) began to play a role in student life. In 1853, students petitioned the faculty to set up a "secret" colony of Delta Kappa Epsilon. (The UVA chapter was officially founded on November 26, 1852). The first request was rejected by the faculty, coming as it did on the heels of years of riotous behavior; according to university historian Philip Alexander Bruce, the faculty feared the "orderly spirit of the student body acting as a whole or in segments, whether organized into secret fraternities or Calathumpian bands"; in another session or two, the chapter became established, and other Greek fraternities followed. It can be said generally about the early UVA fraternities that the only "secret" aspect of them was their operation and meeting location; the membership was not kept secret.

The growth of student organizations was interrupted by the Civil War but resumed thereafter with the establishment of additional fraternities. A few secret societies are recorded during the years 1865–1878, of which the only one of any note is the Dedils, most notable for being shut down by the faculty after their minutes were found where they had been dropped by the drunken president of the organization.

The Eli Banana Society, established in 1878, represented a new kind of secret society at the university. The new "ribbon society" tended to operate as an upper-class society, drew its members from the "upper class", and sought to exercise control over other student groups such as the Jefferson Society. Other ribbon societies included T.I.L.K.A., the Thirteen Club, the Lotus Society, the O.W.L. (a semi-secret society drawing its membership from the newspaper, magazine, and yearbook staff), the Zeta (later the Z Society), and O.N.E.

The suppression of Eli Banana in 1894 and of the Hot Feet/IMP Society in 1908 coincided with the rise of academic societies, including the semi-secret Raven Society, whose members are initiated in a secret ceremony but are otherwise public. At around the same time, the Seven Society, a group so secret that its members are not made known until their death, appeared. The Seven Society established a new model for secret society operation on Grounds.

While the ribbon societies were observed to draw their membership from the fraternities, and the IMPs, and Zs from the ribbon societies, the Seven Society's extreme secrecy meant that the society had no apparent formal connections to the social secret societies. At the same time, its exclusive focus on philanthropy meant that, unlike the Elis and Hot Feet, it functioned as an important contributor to the aims of the university. The Sevens tap not only student leaders but also university administrators and high-profile personnel. They take their secrecy so seriously that they only tap individuals for membership at locations off Grounds. It has been suggested that the IMP Society is composed of the Sevens underlings. The other societies founded after 1905 likewise define themselves as supporting the university, whether through recognizing notable or notorious individuals (P.U.M.P.K.I.N.s, 21 Society, Sons of Liberty) or upholding university traditions (Purple Shadows). The A.N.G.E.L.S. Society reaches out to students who may be struggling or those who display kindness or other laudable characteristics.

A former student once took advantage of the secrecy of secret societies to commit fraud. In 1984, former student Patrick William Michael Pierce created a fictional secret society he called the Council of the Stone Table and took advantage of the university’s procedures for handling secret society’s financial accounts to protect their anonymity. Pierce billed the university’s account $61,300 for personal use despite no donations coming into the account. After his fraud was uncovered, Pierce was indicted on fraud in 1986, and the University changed its financial procedures for secret societies.

== Active societies ==
The following is a list of notable secret societies at the University of Virginia, presented in alphabetical order.

=== A.N.G.E.L.S. Society ===
The A.N.G.E.L.S. Society was founded in 1998. It is "dedicated to reaching out to students and groups who display acts of kindness to their communities" by presenting them with a white rose and a letter of support. White roses are also presented to recognize "noble acts" on Grounds.

=== Eli Banana Society ===
The Eli Banana Society, or The Mystic Order of Eli Banana, was established in 1878 as a "ribbon society" because its members wore an identifying ribbon on their lapel. Historically, it was an upper-class society that recruited its members from fraternities. It is the oldest surviving secret society at the University of Virginia.

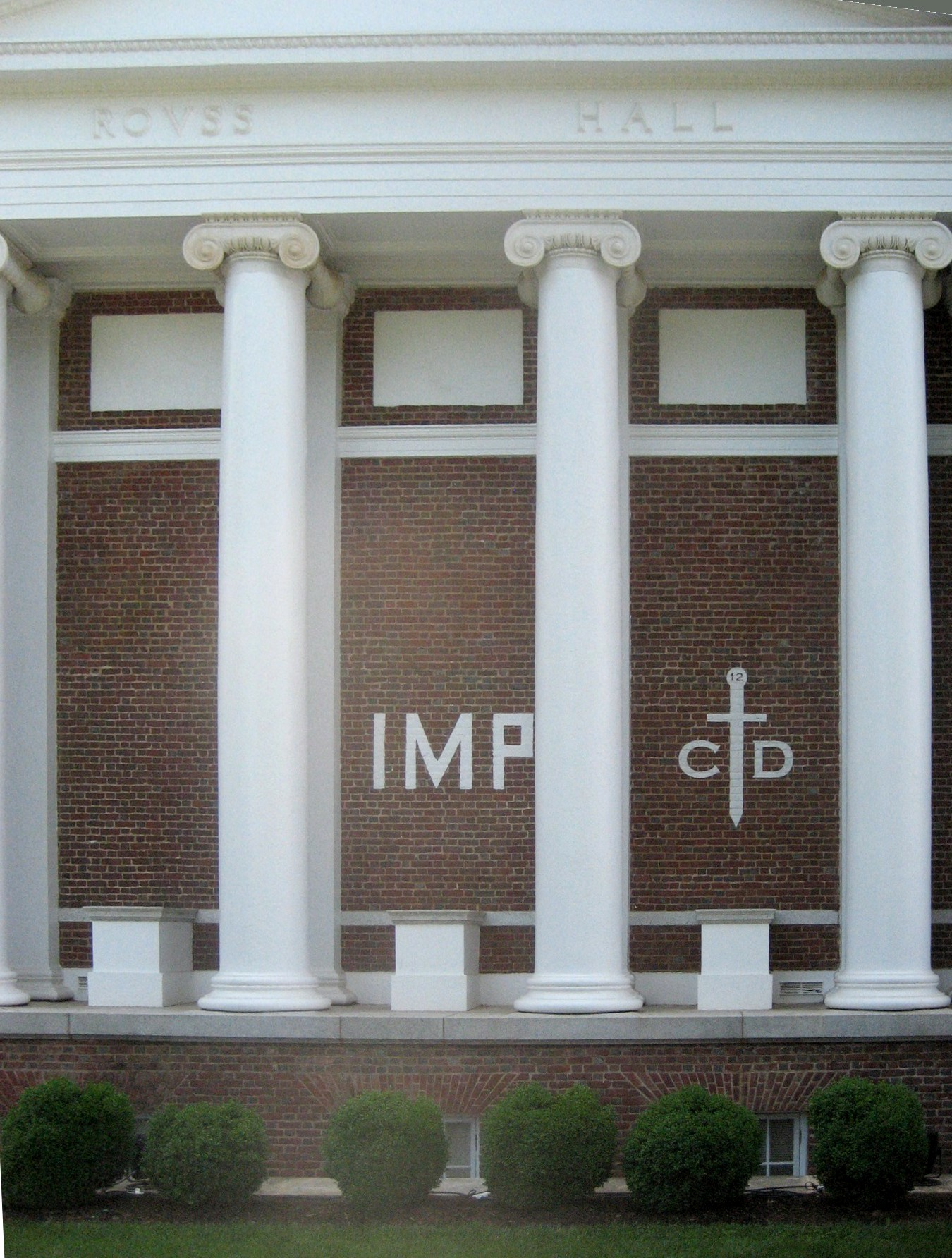
IMP Society (left) and the Order of Claw & Dagger (right) symbols on Rouss Hall, 2009

=== IMP Society ===
The IMP Society was created in 1903. Originally, it was called Hot Feet, but it changed its name in 1913. It is a ring society whose members are sometimes seen wearing horns and carrying pitchforks. In addition to its tradition for pranks to expose members of the Z Society, the IMP Society also presents its IMP Award to outstanding faculty and its IMPStudent Athlete Award to UVA's top female athlete.

=== Lantern Society ===
The Lantern Society is an all-female secret society founded in 2000. It supports gender equality and the advancement of women at the University of Virginia. Each year, the society presents a faculty member with the Lantern Society Award for Leadership in Women's Education.

=== Order of Claw & Dagger ===
The Order of Claw & Dagger formed in 2006 and is an active society of the McIntire School of Commerce. The society honors students and professors in McIntire with published letters based on their core tenets of Honor, Excellence, and Humility. Members of the Order wear black uniform cloaks and white masks to maintain secrecy. Members are recruited while students at McIntire, and membership continues after graduation.

The Order of Claw & Dagger logo is now found on the side of Rouss Hall. Its emblem consists of a downward pointing dagger; under the dagger's hilt are the letter "C" to the left and the letter "D" to the right.

=== O.W.L. Society ===
The O.W.L. Society was established in 1887. One of its activities was publishing The Yellow Journal, the university's humor publication from the 1920s until 1934 when the society went inactive. The society announced its reorganization through a letter on October 19, 2013, saying, "We resurrect the O.W.L. to support, cultivate, and enrich literary culture at the University of Virginia."

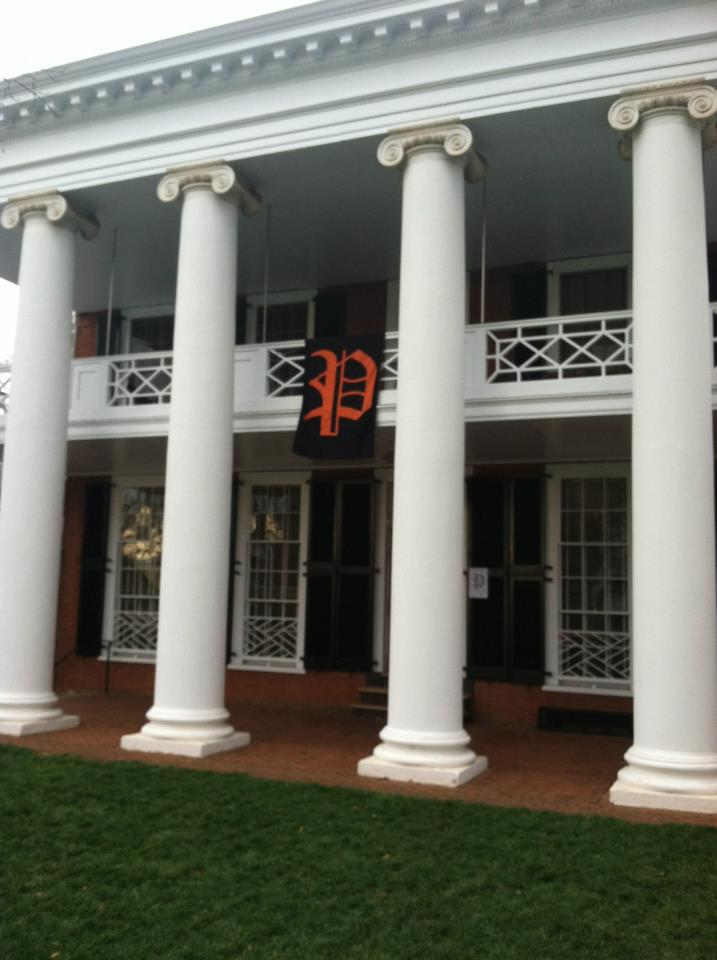
A banner with a scripted "P", representing the P.U.M.P.K.I.N. Society, hanging from a pavilion at the University of Virginia.

=== P.U.M.P.K.I.N. Society ===
The P.U.M.P.K.I.N. Society appeared sometime before 1967 when the earliest known dated citation of the group was published in the Cavalier Daily. It is a secret society whose purpose is to recognize "meritorious service" to UVA. The earliest account of the group takes a humorous tone, claiming a connection to a 14th-century "Societe de la Citrouillie". Its motto is "When The Corn Is In The Bin, The Gourd Is On The Vine."

The group distributes actual pumpkins, along with letters of commendation, annually on the night of Halloween. The society historically presented a rotten or smashed pumpkin, which it called the E.B. Pendleton Award, to an individual whom it felt deserving of criticism on Halloween night, but this practice was ended in 2000. The E.B. Pendleton Award was revived in 2012, with a rotten gourd being presented to Helen Dragas for her role in the Teresa Sullivan ouster.

In addition to distributing pumpkins, the society annually prepares and distributes pumpkin pies, along with letters of commendation, for those staff at UVA who often go unrecognized. The society annually distributes letters of commendation at the end of the Spring semester to recognize fourth-year students who have served the UVA community silently and selflessly.

=== The Raven Society ===
The Raven Society was established on April 20, 1904. Its name is a nod to the poem "The Raven" by UVA alumnus Edgar Allan Poe. The society presents the Raven Award and scholarships. It is based in Room 13 of West Range, the room where Poe lived while a student at the university. It is considered a semi-secret honor society because its memberships are mostly public. As an honor society, it recruits the "best and brightest students and faculty..."

=== Rotunda Burning Society ===
The Rotunda Burning Society is a secret organization founded around 1981. Annually, it commemorates the October 27, 1895, burning of the Rotunda by burning an effigy of the building at the base of the south steps. For the event, the society's members dress in red.

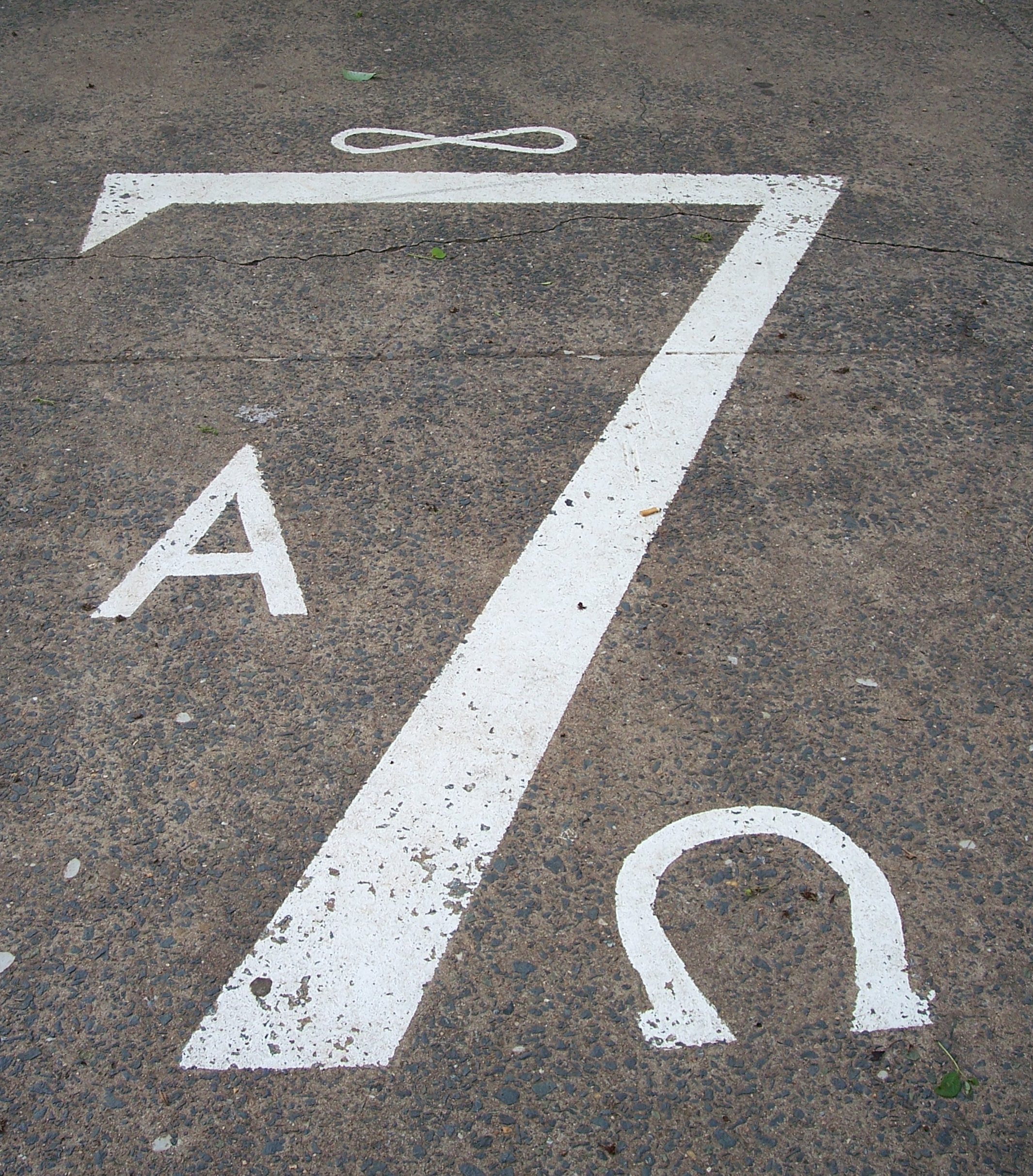
The sign of the Seven Society outside of Maury Hall

=== Seven Society ===
The Seven Society was established around 1905. One campus legend says that the group was formed when only seven of eight individuals showed up for an evening of bridge. It signs letters with the seven astronomical symbols for the planets. It is noted for making gifts to the university, often with flamboyant public presentations. It has made several gifts that repeat the number seven. Correspondence to The Seven Society is left at the base of the statue of Thomas Jefferson that is inside the Rotunda.

Membership in the society is revealed when a member dies with a banner at the member's funeral. The university's bells also ring seven times, every seven seconds, for ten minutes. Historically, the group also sent a wreath of black magnolias that was shaped like the number seven.

=== Society of P.R.I. ===
The Society of P.R.I. was established in 2010 and contributes to the community of the School of Engineering & Applied Science. It recognizes faculty for their commitment to students.

=== Society of Purple Shadows ===
The Society of the Purple Shadows was established in 1963. It is named after a line from the 1903 poem, "The Honor Men", by James Hay Jr. that refers to the purple shadows of The Lawn. The group's stated mission is "to contribute to the betterment of the University and to safeguard vigilantly the University traditions.". This translates to supporting the university's honor system and building and maintaining the university's various traditions. Its members wear purple robes on Founder's Day when they lay a wreath at Thomas Jefferson's statue on The Lawn at sunrise.

Past activities of the Purple Shadows have included anonymous political statements. In the 1970–1971 term, the society gave an ambiguous welcome to assistant dean of student affairs Annette Gibbs, whose responsibilities included advising female undergraduate students at the newly coeducational university, by tying the doors to her office shut with a purple ribbon. In 1982, following the decision of Dean of Students Robert Canevari to ban the traditional Easter celebration, the group left a letter and a dagger expressing their displeasure. The dean filed charges against the group with the University Judiciary Committee, which were never answered.

The Purple Shadows' principal contribution today is the honor system's ongoing support. The Shadows leave notecards for first-year students during convocation to formally welcome them to the honor system; present the James Hay Jr. award for contributions to the honor system; and send letters in defense of the honor system when the existing single sanction system is challenged. The group has taken other stands recently, including encouraging students to end the practice of chanting "not gay" when The Good Old Song is sung.

=== Society of the Dawn ===
The Society of the Dawn, speculated to have been formed in 1984, is a philanthropic society that seeks to bring attention to incidents within the university community through public recognition and dialogue. Acts by the society have included distributing letters of recognition to faculty members deemed examples of high-quality service during fiscal difficulty and the construction of small displays of flowers to bring attention to sexual assault at the university and promote increased administrative combat of sexual crime. Most recently, the Society of the Dawn has issued public statements recognizing dedicated student organizations that diversify the university's public image.

=== Sons and Daughters of Liberty ===
The Sons and Daughters of Liberty (SDL) was established in 2003 as the Sons of Liberty, changing its name in 2011 when it merged with the Daughters of Liberty. It is said to pursue liberty while decrying tyranny. Annually on the eve of Thomas Jefferson's birthday, the SDL posts lists of thirteen individuals they deem "Rebels" and a limited number of individuals or organizations they deem "Tyrants". Traditionally, The Jefferson Literary and Debating Society is always listed as a Tyrant, as there is an ongoing rivalry between the two organizations. The SDL is also known to march down the Lawn on George Washington's birthday, placing a wreath and letter by his statue on the south end of the Lawn.

The SDL is known to carry out pranks and stunts around the university, a notable prank being the dumping of tea down the chimney of the lawn room belonging to a member of the Jefferson Society. Another prank involved coaxing a member of the Jefferson Society from his lawn room, only to dump on him from the balcony above.

SDL members wear white face masks and colonial attire to conceal their identities and speak in a colonial or 18th-century accent. Membership to the society is secret until graduation, when members wear tricorn hats instead of mortarboards.

=== The 13 Society ===
The 13 Society was founded on February 13, 1889, as the Thirteen Club. It is another of the "ribbon societies" because its members used to wear an identifying ribbon on their lapels. It is now classed as an honor society. Its motto is "Superstitio solum in animo inscii habitat" or “Superstition dwells only in the ignorant mind.”

Each year on the eve of April 13, Thomas Jefferson's birthday, the society publishes its membership list. It selects thirteen members each year.

=== Thursdays Society ===
The Thursdays Society is an honorary society formed in the 1970s as a female counterpart to T.I.L.K.A. Society. With the first co-ed class at the university, a few women were admitted into T.I.L.K.A.; however, the rule was shortly after reversed. Thursdays was created by the women who had briefly been in T.I.L.K.A.

Named after a popular social night at the university, the Thursdays society (composed of third and fourth-year women belonging to Kappa Kappa Gamma, Tri Delta, Pi Beta Phi, or Kappa Alpha Theta sororities) fosters female empowerment in a social function. The Thursdays (as they are known colloquially) do not place any great emphasis on maintaining secrecy, therefore "if you're observant enough around Grounds, you may be fortunate enough to see a gaggle of giggling Thursdays" on your walk to class.

=== T.I.L.K.A. Society ===
The T.I.L.K.A. Society, commonly called Tilka, was founded in 1889 as a ribbon society after the model of Eli Banana. The name of the society is said to reference five mystical words that are only known to members. The society rose in prominence after the Elis were suppressed in the late 1890s, capturing most of the student offices.

Like Eli Banana, the Tilkas combined a focus on student leadership with a social function. Dabney notes that from the 1920s to the 1950s, both organizations regularly sponsored formal dances at the university. The organizations were sufficiently integrated into student life by the late 1940s that a Virginia Glee Club album of university songs included the Tilka anthem "Come Fill Your Glasses Up for T.I.L.K.A.".

Notable members of T.I.L.K.A. include UVA football quarterback and alumni association president Gilbert J. Sullivan and university president Frank Hereford. The Tilkas are still active at UVA; a 2004 article in the Cavalier Daily describes their "tapping" ceremony.

=== The 21 Society ===
The 21 Society announced its founding on June 21, 1999, with 21 letters that were distributed to organizations and people on Grounds. Its goal is to protect "student self-governance" and to "unify the politically active students of the University." The semi-secret society has subsequently contributed to the University of Virginia Center for Politics. Its number 21 is frequently painted on campus buildings, especially fraternity and sorority houses. It recognizes 21 seniors each year for their service to the campus community.

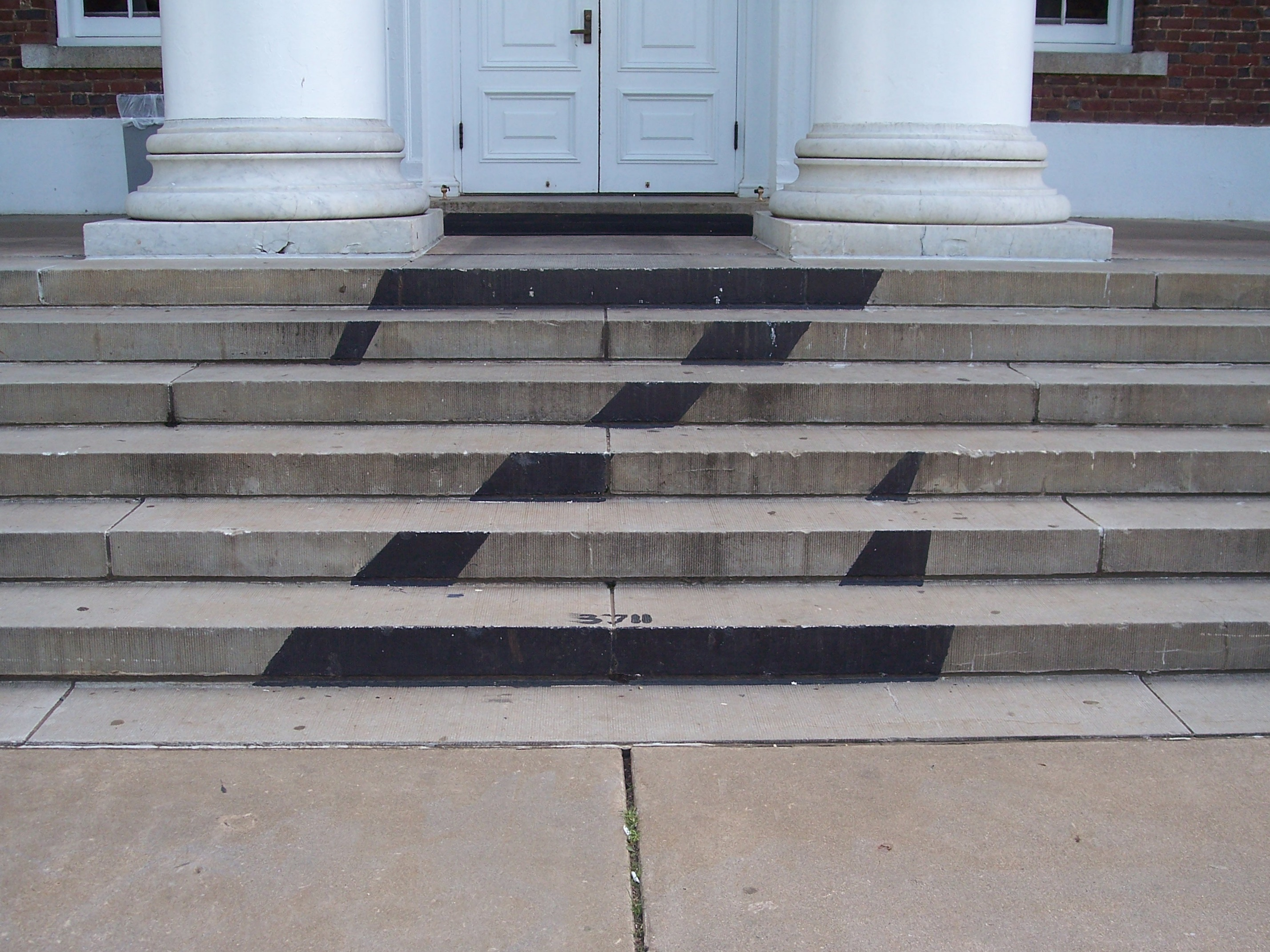
The sign of the Z Society on the steps of Old Cabel Hall

=== Z Society ===
The Z Society was established in 1892. The society traditionally selected its members from Eli Banana and T.I.L.K.A Society. It was one of the university's "ribbon societies" because its members wore an identifying ribbon on their lapel. Its symbol is the Z, which is shown with and without the number 3711, the summation of the founding years of Z Society and the university (1892 plus 1819).

Around 1980, Z Society became a semi-secret ring society with its members remaining secret until graduation, where they wear identifying rings with the Z insignia. The society is known for its Edgar F. Shannon Awards, that is presented to the best graduating students of the university. It is also known for the large white Z appearing on campus to indicate the society's concern for current issues.

== List of societies ==
The following is a list of some of the known secret societies at the University of Virginia by date of establishment. Much of the information has been paraphrased from information compiled by University Guide Service alumni and former University Guide Service historian Charles Irons. This list includes societies that are well-attested by reliable sources. It excludes some societies, such as the Raven Society, that have public membership and therefore are not secret societies by definition.

Name	Date established and range	Type	Status	References
Philomathean Society	1849	Semisecret society	Inactive	
Eli Banana	1878	Semisecret ribbon society	Active	
O.W.L. Society	1887–c. 1921, 1928–1934, 2013	Secret society	Active	
The 13 Society	February 13, 1889	Semisecret honor society	Active	
T.I.L.K.A.	1889	Semisecret ribbon society	Active	
Z Society	1892	Semisecret ring society	Active	
Raven Society	April 20, 1904	Semisecret honor society	Active	
Seven Society	1905	Secret society	Active	
IMP Society	1913	Semisecret ring society	Active	
Society of the Purple Shadows	1963	Secret society	Active	
The Muse Society	c. 1965	Secret society	Active	
P.U.M.P.K.I.N. Society	c. 1967	Secret society	Active	
Thursdays Society	1970s	Semisecret society	Active	
Rotunda Burning Society	c. 1981	Secret society	Active	
Society of the Dawn	c. 1984	Secret society	Active	
The 21 Society	June 21, 1999	Secret society	Active	
The Lantern Society	2000	Secret society	Active	
Sons and Daughters of Liberty	2003	Secret society	Active	
Order of the Claw and Dagger	2006	Secret society	Active	
The Order	2010	Secret society	Active	
Society of P.R.I.	2010	Secret society	Active	
Children of the Quad	2013	Secret society	Active	
The 43 Society	2020	Secret society	Active	

== See also ==
- Collegiate secret societies in North America
