= Edgar F. Shannon Awards =

Award presented at the University of Virginia

Since 1974, the University of Virginia's Z Society has presented Edgar F. Shannon Awards to the "best" graduating students from each of the university's schools.

In the notification letter to the winners each year, the Z Society writes, "The definition of best student is intentionally left ambiguous because each of us pursues greatness in very different ways; however, the best student is an individual who has pursued academic greatness with fervent ardor and keen insight while never forgetting the importance of those priorities aside from school." Winners are determined based upon the recommendations of deans and students.

The awards are named for the University of Virginia's fourth president Edgar F. Shannon.

== Recent winners ==
School	2026	2025	2019	2018	2017	2016	2015	2014	2013	2012	2011	2010	2009	2008	2007
School of Architecture	Isabella Koch	William Anderson Packwood	Hannah Nicole Glatt	Cory Joseph Paradis	Brittany Anne Duguay	Love Paulina Jonson	Claudia Franziska Elzey	Anna Eberle Rhees	Isaac Min Kim	William Rousselet Canup	Sara Allen Harper	Sarah Katherine Rovang	Jared Eldridge Knicley	Malindi Rasangi Lankatilleke	Tamar Shafrir
College of Arts & Sciences	Kimora Bryant	Skylar Ann Gay	Sarah Virginia Wells	Benjamin Daniel Groff	Adam Thomas Antoszewski	Taylor Nicole Wingo	Edward Charles Schrom II	Robert Lundell Richards	Joseph Weje Riley	Reedy Charles Swanson	Ruffin Eley Evans	Jason Harold Shore	Kendall Lee Wallace	Christopher Ross Walters	Lynsey Ann Bates
Frank Batten School of Leadership and Public Policy	Brianna Schindler	Emily Elizbaeth Pitts	Jack DiMatteo	Margaret Nancy Gratz	Cara Grace Mumford	Ebob-Tabi Besong, Michelle Hye-Sun Cho		Ian William Van der Hoven	Anna Katherine Rorem	Borna Kazerooni	Anna A. Draganova	Sarah Rothgeb Pinsky			
Graduate School of Arts & Sciences	Alex Michael Garcia	Austin J Benson	Eric Ralph Hupe	Matthew Robert Adams	Ariel Frances Kahrl	Julie Elisabeth Starr	Thomas A Talhelm	Joanna Elizabeth Swafford				Kristine Grayson Dattelbaum	Charles William Tanksley		
School of Education and Human Development (formerly Curry School of Education)	Vadella Ellis-Pope	Maya Renee Johnson	Samuel David Stephenson	Mark Vincent Beltran Yu	Keaton Matthew Wadzinski	Shanna Eisner Hirsch	Hilary Gail Dack	Andrea Kathryn Chernau	Kathryn Highley Norbo	Amanda Frances Sovik-Johnston	Jessica Ann Hockett	Adam Robert Hoppe	Jennifer Kara Fier	Kevin Patrick Haddix	Danielle Elise Fallon
School of Engineering & Applied Science	Shriya Dale	Lukas Milo Lehman	Mary-Michael Robertson	Frances Lerae Morales	Daniel Naveed Tavakol	Nicholas Richard Lee Katzman	Rishi Raj Gupta	Davis Whitaker Blalock	Joshua Michael Raymond	Gregory Eugene Troyer	Ryan William Engels	William Monroe Jacobs	Jason Anthony Pan	Eliah Ruth Shamir	Daniel Joseph Glanz Jr.
School of Law	Brian C. Curtis	Kevin Hoang	William N. Hall	Daniel J. Richardson	Andrew Manns	Jared Michael Kelson	Samuel Matthew Strongin	Benjamin Charles Wood	Galen Bundy Bascom	Katherine Grace Mims Crocker	Emily Rebecca Gantt	John Savage Moran	Matthew Brian Nicholson	Katherine Ireland Twomey	Ajeet Pundalika Pai
McIntire School of Commerce	Michael Edwards	Alexandra Belt Pentimonti	Calvin Ralph Yeh	Matthew Jerome D'Agati	Jacob Aaron Zodikoff	Douglas Wang-Lun Chan	Alexandra Mayne Griswold	Ryan William Whitney	Joshua Kane Bressler	Robert Michael Kolosieke	Sieglinde Berit Hindrichs	Ke Ma	John B. Messamore Jr.	Jennifer Renee Clifton	Terry Edward Schnuck Jr., Graham Edmunds Tucker
School of Medicine	Kelly Anne Denhard	Joseph Dan Khoa Nguyen	Franck Herve Azobou Tonleu	Elizabeth Thai-An Hoang	Sarah Elizabeth Podwika	Lauren Elise Evers	Julia Vivian Loewenthal	Pranay Sinha	Irina Vladimirovna Kryzhanovskaya		Paul David Hiles	Andrew Neil Pfeffer	Jason Michael Franasiak	David Benjamin Bumpass	Mok-chung Jennifer Chow
School of Nursing	Emily Montemuro	Nakayla Renae Figgins	Katherine Lindsey Young	Nicole Jefferson	Carolyn Joan Saunders	Emily Lauren Winchester	Cynthia Anne Quarles	Sarah Jeanne Haas	Brooke Elizabeth Atkinson	Sarah Beth Borchelt	Madeline Ann Matthews	Carolyn Elizabeth Lawson	Alicia Marie Dean	Sarah Morris Boschung	Kelly Marie Wood
