= W. Douglas Gordon =

American newspaper editor (1876–1944)

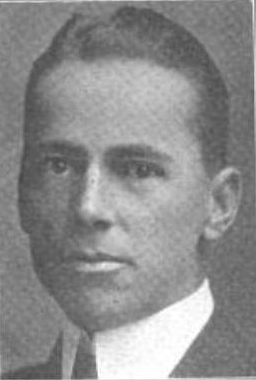
- W. Douglas Gordon, 1917
- Born: William Douglas Gordon; April 27, 1876; Richmond, Virginia, U.S.
- Died: May 4, 1944 (aged 68); Norfolk, Virginia, U.S.
- Education: University of Virginia Law School; University of Virginia
- Occupations: Newspaper editor, music and drama critic, lawyer
- Employer(s): The Norfolk Ledger-Dispatch; Richmond Times-Dispatch; Cannon and Gordon

William Douglas Gordon (April 27, 1876 – May 4, 1944) was an American newspaper editor, critic, and attorney. He was editor of The Norfolk Ledger-Dispatch in Virginia for 22 years. He was also a critic and editor of the Richmond Times-Dispatch. At his death, The Richmond News Leader wrote, "He was much more than an editor: he was a Norfolk institution."

== Early life ==
Gordon was born in Richmond, Virginia. He was the son of Evelyn Croxton and James Roy Gordon, an attorney and member of the Richmond City Council. In his youth, he was an avid horseman.

He attended McGuire's University School in Richmond, graduating in 1894. He then enrolled in the University of Virginia for two years of undergraduate studies and two years of law studies, receiving an LL.B. in 1898. At the University of Virginia, he was a member of the Fraternity of Delta Psi (St. Anthony Hall), the VVV Dramatic Club, the Glee Club, Eli Banana, and The Z Society.

== Career ==
On April 2, 1900, Gordon formed the law firm of Cannon and Gordon with James E. Cannon; they stayed together for eleven years. They practiced together for eleven years at 911 East Main Street in Richmond, Virginia. He was a member and board member of the Richmond Bar Association; in May 1903 he joined that organization in asking the state legislature to adopt of the Torrens System of land registration, In August 1903, Gordon served as acting city attorney for Norfolk while city attorney Henry R. Pollard was on vacation. He also served as secretary of the Virginia Bar Association. Gordon was once suggested for a position as a Juvenile Court judge but declined the nomination.

Gordon served on the Richmond Board of Police Commissions and became police commissioner in 1907. In 1915, Gordon received "a clean bill of health" in an investigation into claims of corruption of both Commissioner Gordon and other members of the board. The lead investigator concluded, "But I know this to be a fact—there is not a scratch of the pen against Mr. Gordon's record as a member of the Board of Police Commissioners…Mr. Gordon's record…is above suspicion."

He was also secretary of the State Fair of Virginia for seven years and the treasurer and secretary of the Master Builder's Association of Richmond. He was also appointed to serve on the Virginia Civil War History Commission by Governor Westmoreland Davis. In addition, he served on the Norfolk Interracial Committee.

In 1909, Gordon became a music and drama critic for the Richmond Times-Dispatch in the heyday of road shows and vaudeville. However, as movies started to replace live shows, he also reviewed books and wrote editorials for the newspaper. At the time of his death one newspaper noted, "Broad interests engender broad thinking, and his editorial columns showed the result of it." In addition, "His inclusive mind possessed an unusual acumen for analysis of a situation, for finding whatever factor was the disturbing one and displaying it to the public so that it could be easily discerned. Again, his comments were peculiarly notable for the absence of acid and the friendly appreciation of all sides of the question. He could call attention to a wrong, an error, without provoking enmity."

Many of his editorials attacked improper English; he especially disliked "'you all' in the singular and 'in back of' because he considered the 'in' superfluous." He was also known as "a champion of minority groups."

Gordon became editor of The Norfolk Ledger Dispatch, on July 2, 1917. In 1923, he became an associate editor, and later editor, of the Richmond Times-Dispatch. He returned as to The Norfolk Ledger Dispatch as editor in 1928, remaining in that position until his death. He served on the board of Norfolk Newspapers, Inc., the parent company of both The Virginia Pilot and the Ledger Dispatch. He also learned the technical side of printing newspapers and was an expert in typography.

== Honors ==
- The original chapter of Phi Beta Kappa at the College of William and Mary made him an honorary member.
- He was made an honorary member of the Typographical Union No. 90.

== Personal life ==
In 1902, Gordon was on a committee in charge of the dedication of a new chapter house for his college fraternity, Delta Psi. He was also a member of the committee that organized a University of Virginia alumni reunion in Richmond in 1903. In 1906 and 1907, he served on the board of governors of the Wednesday Club which coordinated and hosted the week-long Richmond Music Festival. He was a baritone soloist, performing at churches, synagogues, fund raisers, and for civic and cultural organizations. He was also a guest conductor of the men's chorus at St. Paul's Church in Richmond.

He belonged to Christ and St. Luke's Episcopal Church and was a member of the Wednesday Club, the Norfolk Rotary Club, the Richmond German Club, the Richmond Association of Alumni of the University of Virginia, and The Commonwealth Club, serving on the board of governors of the latter. One of his hobbies was repairing watches.

Gordon married Mabel Walker of Richmond, Virginia on April 27, 1916, in the Church of the Holy Trinity in Richmond. She was the daughter of Major and Mrs. D. N. Walker. The couple did not have any children.

In 1941, he had a severe case of pneumonia that limited his activity over the next few years. On April 25, 1944, he was admitted to Norfolk General Hospital for pneumonia. Nine days later, he died at Norfolk General Hospital in Norfolk, Virginia at the age of 67.

His funeral was held at Christ and St. Luke's Episcopal Church in Norfolk. The service was officiated by Rev. Dr. Taylor Willis of Christ and St. Luke's Episcopal Church, Rev. Sparks W. Melton of the Freeman Street Baptist Church, and Rev. L. D. Medoza of the Ohef Sholom Temple. He was buried in Hollywood Cemetery in Richmond with a brief service that was attended by Governor Colgate Darden and John Stewart Bryan
