= Yellow journalism =

Sensationalistic news

In journalism, yellow journalism is the use of eye-catching headlines and sensationalized exaggerations for increased sales, while the yellow press are American newspapers which do so. This term is chiefly used in American English, whereas in the United Kingdom, the similar term tabloid journalism is more common. Yellow journalism emerged in a competition for readers between two newspapers in New York City in the 1890s. It was not common in other cities.

Joseph Pulitzer purchased the New York World in 1883 and told his editors to use sensationalism, crusades against corruption, and lavish use of illustrations to boost circulation. William Randolph Hearst then purchased the rival New York Journal in 1895. They engaged in an intense circulation war, at a time when most men bought one copy every day from rival street vendors shouting their paper's headlines. The term "yellow journalism" originated from the innovative popular "Yellow Kid" comic strip that was published first in the World and later in the Journal.

This type of reporting was characterized by exaggerated headlines, unverified claims, partisan agendas, and a focus on topics like crime, scandal, sports, and violence. Historians have debated whether yellow journalism played a large role in inflaming public opinion about Spain's atrocities in Cuba at the time, and perhaps pushing the U.S. into the Spanish-American War of 1898. Most historians say it did not do so. The two papers reached a large working class Democratic audience, while the nation's upscale Republican decision makers (such as President William McKinley and leaders in Congress) seldom read the yellow press.

== Definitions ==
Journalism historian W. Joseph Campbell described yellow press newspapers as having daily multi-column front-page headlines covering a variety of topics, such as sports and scandal, using bold layouts (with large illustrations and perhaps color), heavy reliance on unnamed sources, and unabashed self-promotion. The term was extensively used to describe two major New York City newspapers around 1900 as they battled for circulation.

Journalism historian Frank Luther Mott used five characteristics to identify yellow journalism:

1. Scare headlines in huge print, often sensationalizing minor news
2. Lavish use of pictures, or imaginary drawings
3. Use of faked interviews, misleading headlines, pseudoscience, and a parade of false learning from so-called experts
4. Emphasis on full-color Sunday supplements, usually with superficial articles and comics
5. Dramatic sympathy with the "underdog" against the system.

Another common feature was emphasizing sensationalized crime reporting to boost sales and excite public opinion.

== Origins: Pulitzer vs. Hearst ==
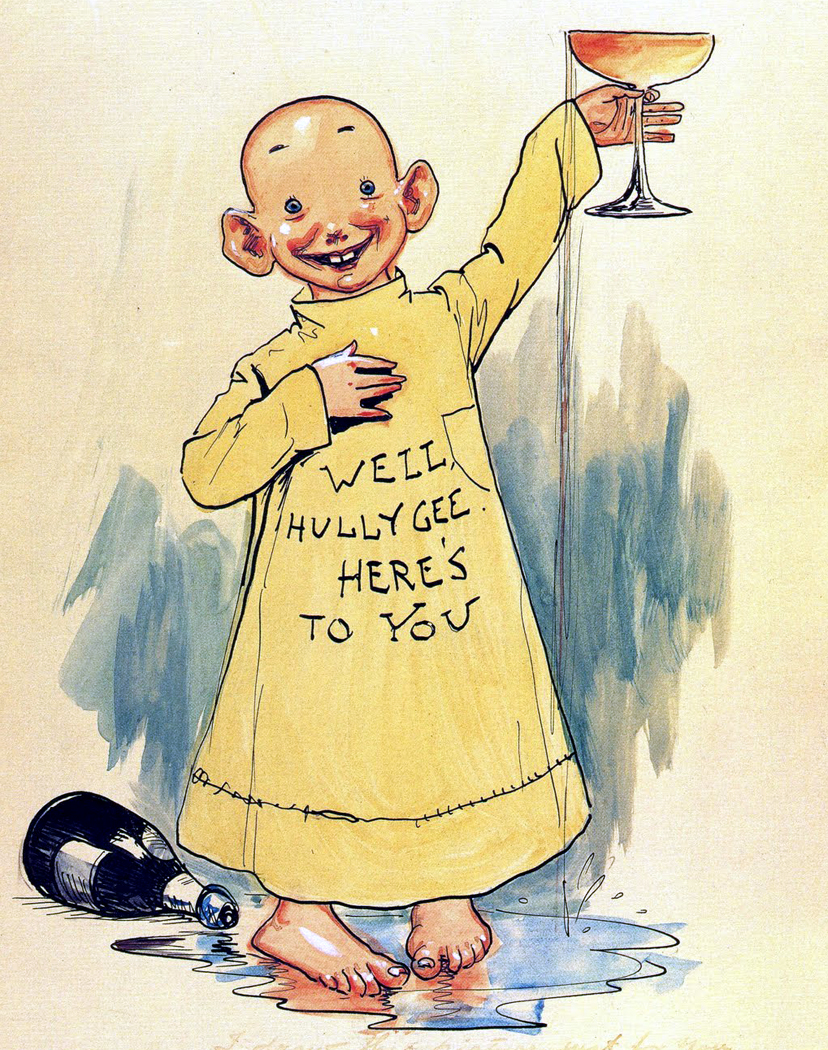
The Yellow Kid, drawn by Richard F. Outcault, appeared first in Pulitzer's New York World and then moved to Hearst's New York Journal.

=== Coinage and early usage ===
The term was coined in the mid-1890s to characterize the sensational journalism in the circulation war between Joseph Pulitzer's New York World and William Randolph Hearst's New York Journal. The battle peaked from 1895 to about 1898, and historical usage often refers specifically to this period. Both papers were sensationalizing the news in order to drive up circulation, although the newspapers did serious reporting as well. The coinage of the term is mostly atrributed to Ervin Wardman, the editor of the New York Press. Wardman was the first to publish the term but there is evidence that expressions such as "yellow journalism" and "school of yellow kid journalism" were already used by newsmen of that time; an English magazine in 1898 had already noted, "All American journalism is not 'yellow', though all strictly 'up-to-date' yellow journalism is American!". Wardman never defined the term exactly. Possibly it was a mutation from earlier slander where Wardman twisted "new journalism" into "nude journalism".

Wardman had also used the expression "yellow kid journalism" referring to the then-popular comic strip, The Yellow Kid, which was published by both Pulitzer and Hearst during a circulation war. Richard F. Outcault, author of the popular cartoon strip, had been tempted away from the World by Hearst and the cartoon accounted substantially towards a big increase in sales of the Journal.

=== Hearst in San Francisco, Pulitzer in New York ===
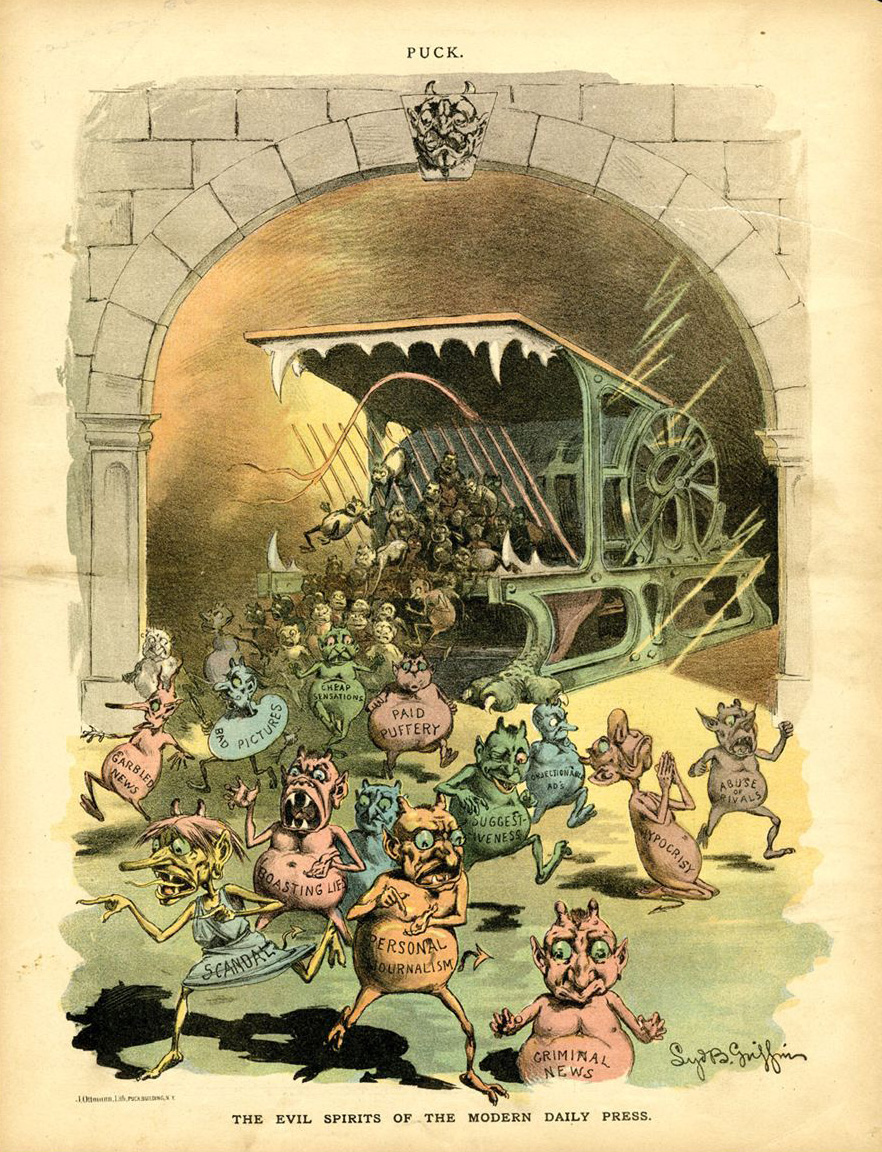
"Evil spirits", such as "Paid Puffery" and "Suggestiveness", spew from "the modern daily press" in this Puck cartoon of November 21, 1888.

Joseph Pulitzer purchased the New York World in 1883 after making the St. Louis Post-Dispatch the dominant daily in that city. Pulitzer strove to make the New York World an entertaining read, and filled his paper with pictures, games and contests that drew in new readers. Crime stories filled many of the pages, with headlines like "Was He a Suicide?" and "Screaming for Mercy". In addition, Pulitzer charged readers only two cents per issue but gave readers eight and sometimes 12 pages of information (the only other two-cent paper in the city never exceeded four pages).

While there were many sensational stories in the New York World, they were by no means the only pieces, or even the dominant ones. Pulitzer believed that newspapers were public institutions with a duty to improve society, and he put the World in the service of social reform. Pulitzer explained that:

The American people want something terse, forcible, picturesque, striking, something that will arrest their attention, enlist their sympathy, arouse their indignation, stimulate their imagination, convince their reason, [and] awaken their conscience.

Just two years after Pulitzer took it over, the World became the highest-circulation newspaper in New York, aided in part by its strong ties to the Democratic Party. Older publishers, envious of Pulitzer's success, began criticizing the World, harping on its crime stories and stunts while ignoring its more serious reporting—trends which influenced the popular perception of yellow journalism. Charles Dana, editor of the New York Sun, attacked The World and said Pulitzer was "deficient in judgment and in staying power."

Pulitzer's approach made an impression on William Randolph Hearst, a mining heir who acquired the San Francisco Examiner from his father in 1887. Hearst studied the World and resolved to make the San Francisco Examiner as bright as Pulitzer's paper.

Under his leadership, the Examiner devoted 24 percent of its space to crime, presenting the stories as morality plays, and sprinkled adultery and "nudity" (by 19th-century standards) on the front page. A month after Hearst took over the paper, the Examiner ran this headline about a hotel fire:

HUNGRY, FRANTIC FLAMES. They Leap Madly Upon the Splendid Pleasure Palace by the Bay of Monterey, Encircling Del Monte in Their Ravenous Embrace From Pinnacle to Foundation. Leaping Higher, Higher, Higher, With Desperate Desire. Running Madly Riotous Through Cornice, Archway and Facade. Rushing in Upon the Trembling Guests with Savage Fury. Appalled and Panic-Stricken the Breathless Fugitives Gaze Upon the Scene of Terror. The Magnificent Hotel and Its Rich Adornments Now a Smoldering heap of Ashes. The Examiner Sends a Special Train to Monterey to Gather Full Details of the Terrible Disaster. Arrival of the Unfortunate Victims on the Morning's Train – A History of Hotel del Monte – The Plans for Rebuilding the Celebrated Hostelry – Particulars and Supposed Origin of the Fire.

Hearst could be hyperbolic in his crime coverage; one of his early pieces, regarding a "band of murderers", attacked the police for forcing Examiner reporters to do their work for them. But while indulging in these stunts, the Examiner also increased its space for international news, and sent reporters out to uncover municipal corruption and inefficiency.

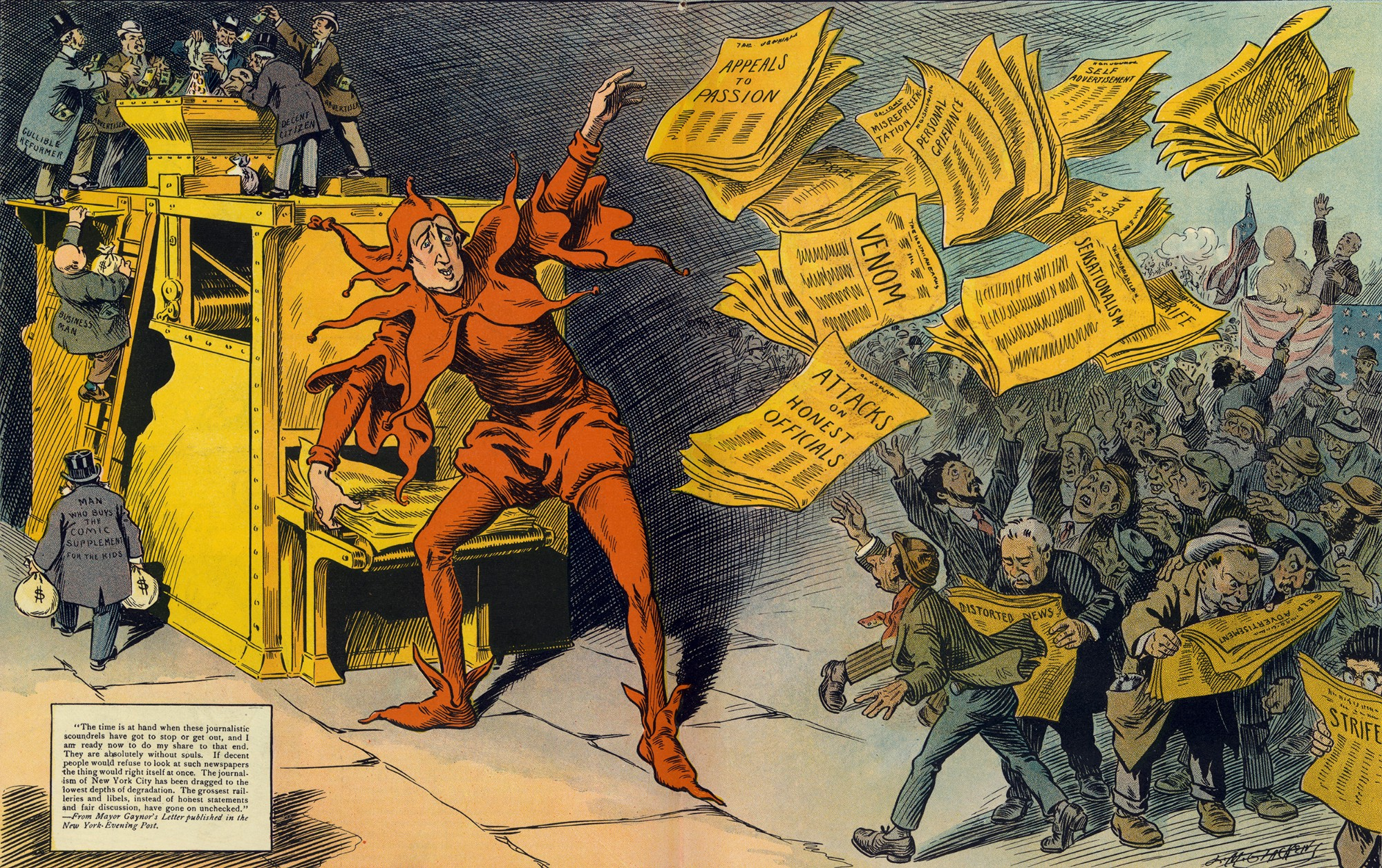
"The Yellow Press", by L. M. Glackens, portrays William Randolph Hearst as a jester distributing sensational stories.

In one well remembered story, Examiner reporter Winifred Black was admitted into a San Francisco hospital and discovered that poor women were treated with "gross cruelty". The entire hospital staff was fired the morning the piece appeared.

=== Competition in New York ===
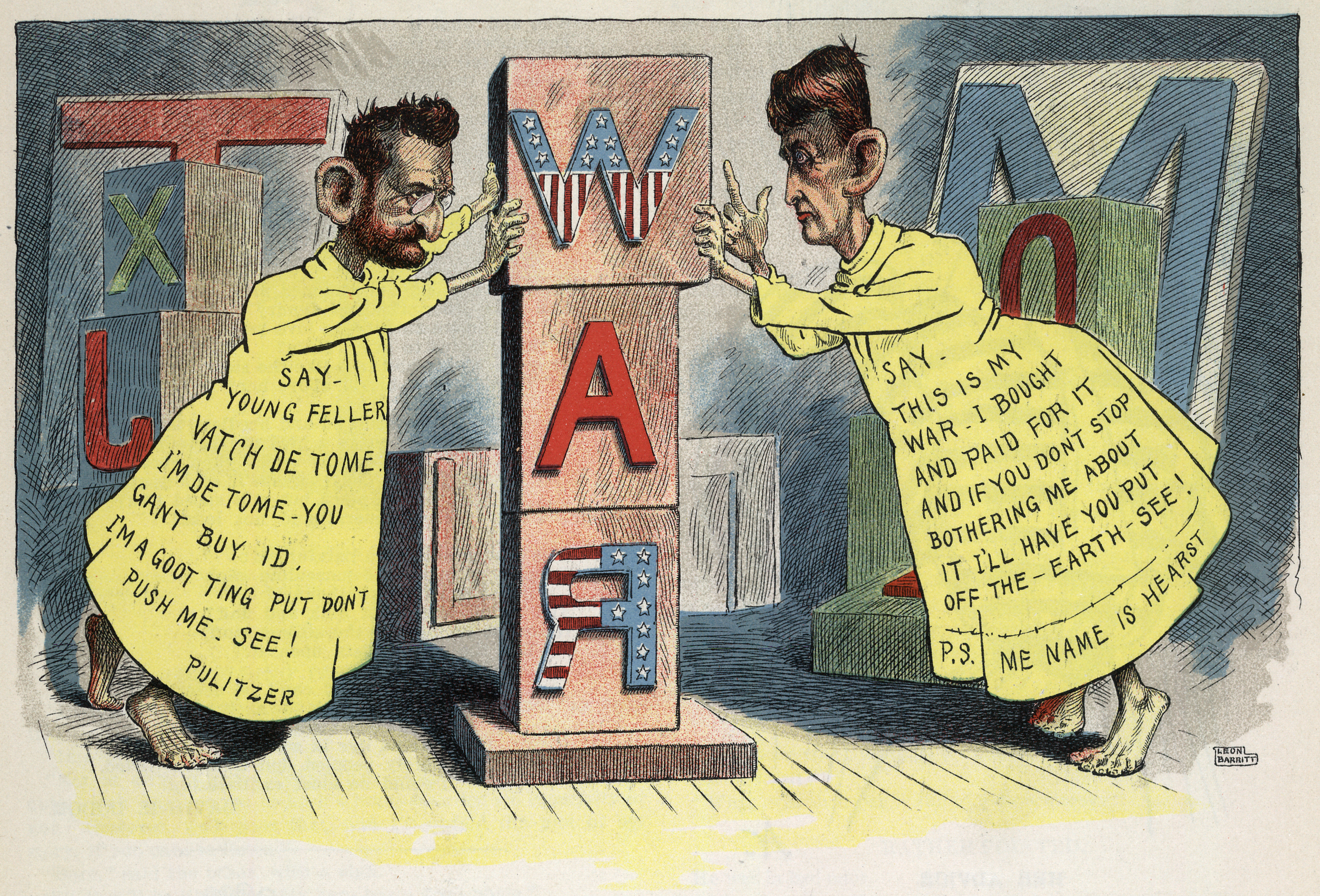
"Yellow journalism" cartoon about the Spanish–American War of 1898. The newspaper publishers Joseph Pulitzer and William Randolph Hearst are both attired as the Yellow Kid comics character of the time, and are competitively claiming ownership of the war.

With the success of the Examiner established by the early 1890s, Hearst began looking for a New York newspaper to purchase, and acquired the New York Journal in 1895, a penny paper.

Metropolitan newspapers started going after department store advertising in the 1890s, and discovered the larger the circulation base, the better. This drove Hearst; following Pulitzer's earlier strategy, he kept the Journal's price at one cent (compared to The World's two-cent price) while providing as much information as rival newspapers. The approach worked, and as the Journal's circulation jumped to 150,000, Pulitzer cut his price to a penny, hoping to drive his young competitor into bankruptcy.

In a counterattack, Hearst raided the staff of the World in 1896. While most sources say that Hearst simply offered more money, Pulitzer—who had grown increasingly abusive to his employees—had become a difficult man to work for, and many World employees were willing to jump for the sake of getting away from him.

Although the competition between the World and the Journal was fierce, the papers were temperamentally alike. Both were Democratic, both were sympathetic to labor and immigrants (a sharp contrast to upscale papers like the New-York Tribune's Whitelaw Reid, that blamed poverty on moral defects). Both invested enormous resources in their Sunday editions, which functioned like weekly magazines, going beyond the normal scope of daily journalism.

Their Sunday entertainment features included the first color comic strip pages. Hogan's Alley, a comic strip revolving around a bald child in a yellow nightshirt (nicknamed The Yellow Kid), became exceptionally popular when cartoonist Richard F. Outcault began drawing it in the World in early 1896. When Hearst hired Outcault away, Pulitzer asked artist George Luks to continue the strip with his characters, giving the city two Yellow Kids. The use of "yellow journalism" as a synonym for over-the-top sensationalism thus started with more serious newspapers commenting on the excesses of "the Yellow Kid papers".

== Spanish–American War ==
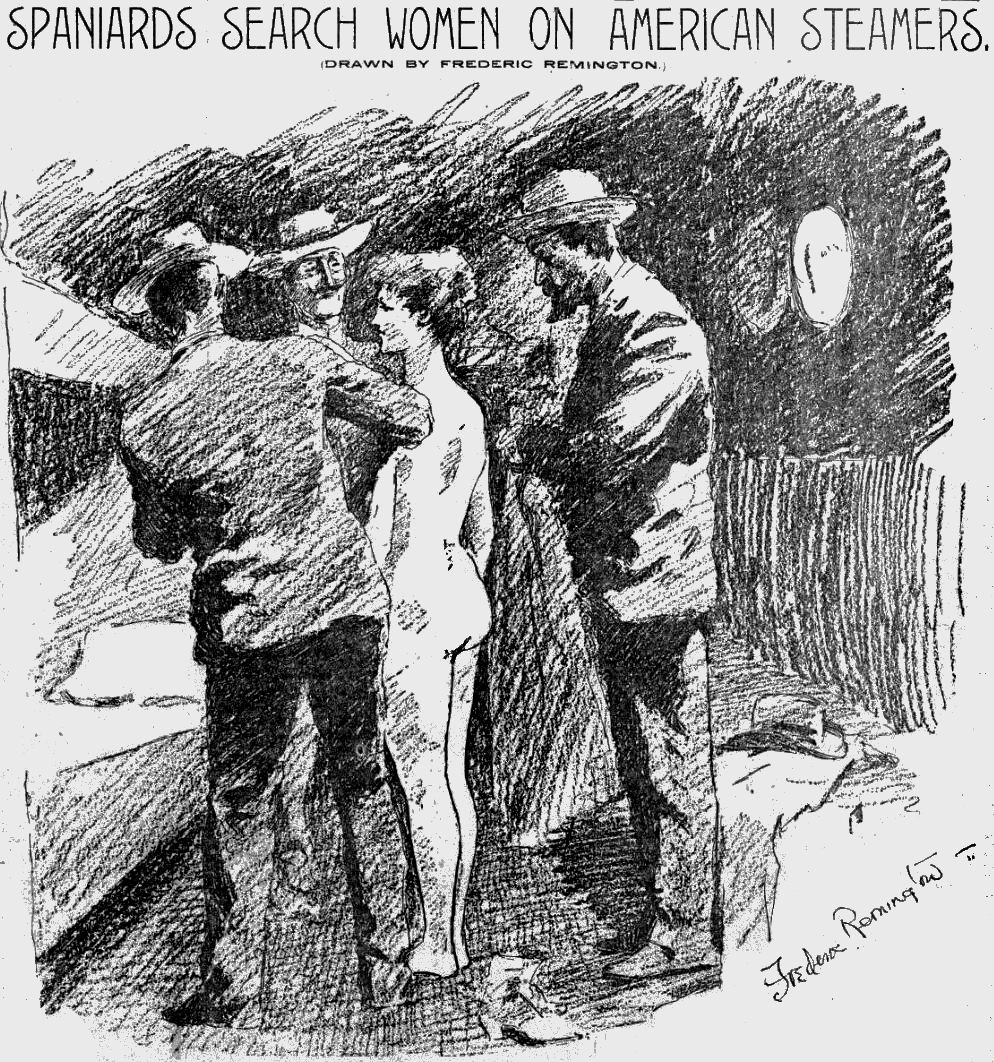
Male Spanish officials strip search an American woman tourist in Cuba looking for messages from rebels; front page "yellow journalism" from Hearst (artist: Frederic Remington).

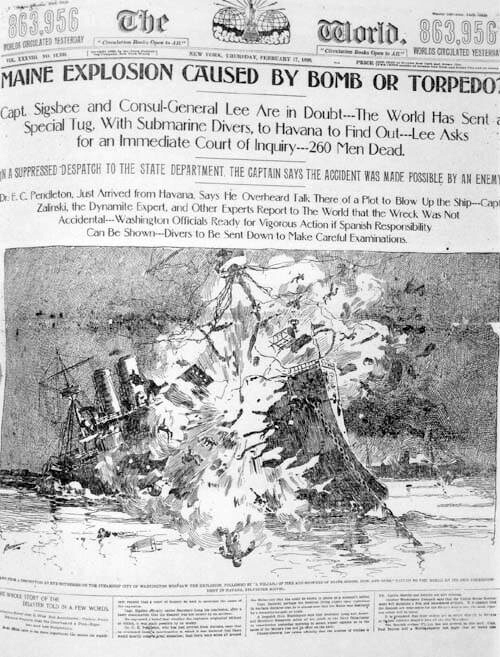
Pulitzer's treatment in the World emphasizes a horrible explosion.

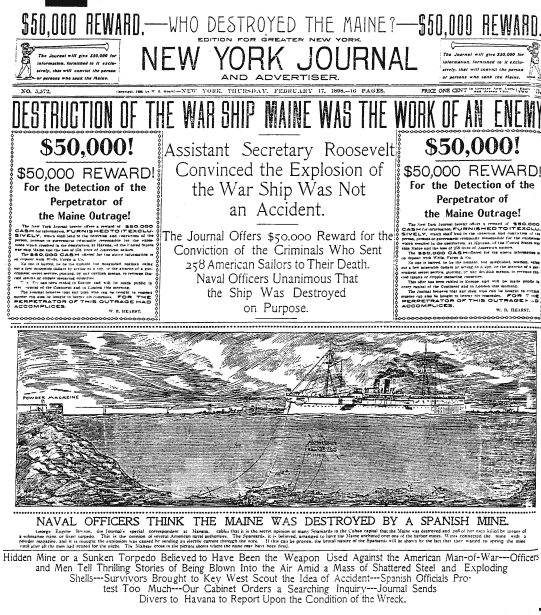
Hearst's treatment was more effective and focused on the enemy who set the bomb—and offered a huge reward to readers.

Pulitzer and Hearst in the 1920s and 1930s were blamed as a cause of entry into the Spanish–American War due to sensationalist stories or exaggerations of the terrible conditions in Cuba. James Creelman wrote an anecdote in his memoir that artist Frederic Remington telegrammed Hearst to tell him all was quiet in Cuba and "There will be no war." Creelman claimed Hearst responded "Please remain. You furnish the pictures and I'll furnish the war." Hearst denied the veracity of the story, and no one has found any evidence of the telegrams existing. Historian Emily Erickson states:

Serious historians have dismissed the telegram story as unlikely. ... The hubris contained in this supposed telegram, however, does reflect the spirit of unabashed self-promotion that was a hallmark of the yellow press and of Hearst in particular.

Hearst became a war hawk after a rebellion broke out in Cuba in 1895. Stories of Cuban virtue and Spanish brutality soon dominated his front page. While the accounts were of dubious accuracy, the newspaper readers of the 19th century did not expect, or necessarily want, his stories to be pure nonfiction. Historian Michael Robertson has said that "Newspaper reporters and readers of the 1890s were much less concerned with distinguishing among fact-based reporting, opinion and literature."

Pulitzer, though lacking Hearst's resources, kept the story on his front page. The yellow press covered the revolution extensively and often inaccurately, but conditions on Cuba were horrific enough. The island was in a terrible economic depression, and Spanish general Valeriano Weyler, sent to crush the rebellion, herded Cuban peasants into concentration camps, leading hundreds of Cubans to their deaths. Having clamored for a fight for two years, Hearst took credit for the conflict when it came: A week after the United States declared war on Spain, he ran "How do you like the Journal's war?" on his front page. In fact, President William McKinley never read the Journal, nor newspapers like the Tribune and the New York Evening Post. Moreover, journalism historians have noted that yellow journalism was largely confined to New York City, and that newspapers in the rest of the country did not follow their lead. The Journal and the World were pitched to Democrats in New York City and were not among the top ten sources of news in regional papers; they seldom made headlines outside New York City. Piero Gleijeses looked at 41 major newspapers and finds:

Eight of the papers in my sample advocated war or measures that would lead to war before the Maine blew up; twelve joined the pro-war ranks in the wake of the explosion; thirteen strongly opposed the war until hostilities began. The borders between the groups are fluid. For example, the Wall Street Journal and Dun's Review opposed the war, but their opposition was muted. The New York Herald, the New York Commercial Advertiser and the Chicago Times-Herald came out in favour of war in March, but with such extreme reluctance that it is misleading to include them in the pro-war ranks.

War came because public opinion was sickened by the bloodshed, and because leaders like McKinley realized that Spain had lost control of Cuba. These factors weighed more on the president's mind than the melodramas in the New York Journal. Historian Nick Kapur argues that McKinley's actions were based more on his values of arbitrationism, pacifism, humanitarianism, and manly self-restraint, than on external pressures.

When the invasion began, Hearst sailed directly to Cuba as a war correspondent, providing sober and accurate accounts of the fighting. Creelman later praised the work of the reporters for exposing the horrors of Spanish misrule, arguing, "no true history of the war ... can be written without an acknowledgment that whatever of justice and freedom and progress was accomplished by the Spanish–American War was due to the enterprise and tenacity of yellow journalists, many of whom lie in unremembered graves."

=== After the war ===
Hearst was a leading Democrat who promoted William Jennings Bryan for president in 1896 and 1900. He later ran for mayor and governor and even sought the presidential nomination, but lost much of his personal prestige when outrage exploded in 1901 after columnist Ambrose Bierce and editor Arthur Brisbane published separate columns months apart that suggested the assassination of William McKinley. When McKinley was shot on September 6, 1901, critics accused Hearst's Yellow Journalism of driving Leon Czolgosz to the deed. It was later presumed that Hearst did not know of Bierce's column, and he claimed to have pulled Brisbane's after it ran in a first edition, but the incident would haunt him for the rest of his life, and all but destroyed his presidential ambitions.

When later asked about Hearst's reaction to the incident, Bierce reportedly said, "I have never mentioned the matter to him, and he never mentioned it to me."

Pulitzer, haunted by his "yellow sins," returned the World to its crusading roots as the new century dawned. By the time of his death in 1911, the World was a widely respected publication, and would remain a leading progressive paper until its demise in 1931. Its name lived on in the Scripps-Howard New York World-Telegram, and then later the New York World-Telegram and Sun in 1950, and finally was last used by the New York World-Journal-Tribune from September 1966 to May 1967. At that point, only one broadsheet newspaper was left in New York City.

== See also ==
- Big lie – Propaganda technique
- Clickbait
- Fake news
- Godi media
- The Yellow Journal
- Protest paradigm
- Purple prose

== Sources ==
- Emory, Edwin; Emory, Michael (1984), The Press and America (4th ed.), Prentice Hall
- Nasaw, David (2000), The Chief: The Life of William Randolph Hearst, Houghton Mifflin
- Smythe, Ted Curtis (2003). The Gilded Age Press, 1865–1900. pp. 173–202. Archived from the original on July 16, 2012 – via Questia.
- Swanberg, W.A (1967), Pulitzer, Charles Scribner's Sons
- Wood, Mary (February 2, 2004), "Selling the Kid: The Role of Yellow Journalism", The Yellow Kid on the Paper Stage: Acting out Class Tensions and Racial Divisions in the New Urban Environment, American Studies at the University of Virginia, archived from the original on November 7, 2014
