= Raven Society =

Honor society at the University of Virginia

- Founded: 1904; 122 years ago University of Virginia
- Type: Honor
- Affiliation: Independent
- Status: Active
- Scope: Local
- Chapters: 1
- Members: 60 active
- Nickname: Ravens
- Headquarters: PO Box 400314; Charlottesville, Virginia 22904; United States
- Website: aig.alumni.virginia.edu/raven/

The Raven Society is an honor society at the University of Virginia in Charlottesville, Virginia. It was founded in 1904 by William McCully James who named it in honor of the poem by Edgar Allan Poe, who attended the University of Virginia in 1826.

The Raven Society's name came from "The Raven", a narrative poem by Edgar Allan Poe, who attended the University of Virginia in 1826. The society's emblem is a black enamel raven mounted upon a gold-colored base.

== History ==
In 1904, University of Virginia student William McCully James proposed a new merit-based student society to promote literary and forensic work and to recognize outstanding scholarship. Once the new society was approved, a faculty committee selected twelve students who demonstrated academic excellence; the twelve were invited to join the society and were sworn in on April 20, 1904.

The twelve members met to adopt a constitution on April 27, 1904. It stated that one of the Raven Society's main goals is "to bring together the best men in the various departments of the university for mutual acquaintance and for cooperation in their efforts to protect the honor and dignity of the university." The initial twelve also chose additional members, bringing the number of charter members to 31 students and four faculty. The founding members and their campus affiliations were:

- George E. Adams (medical school)
- Rufus H. Barringer (engineering school)
- Louis Baum (academic school)
- R. P. Bell (college-at-large)
- Donald McKay Blair (engineering school)
- T. B. Bryan (academic school)
- John D. Butzner (medical school)
- F. N. Caliach (magazine medal)
- Eugene Calloway (medical school)
- W. W. Coxe (editor-in-chief)
- Cary N. Davis (law school)
- A. M. Dobie (law school)
- W. A. Fleet (academic school)
- John Flory (editor-in-chief)
- J. K. Graves (law school)
- W. S. Gray (medical school)
- Richard Heath Dabney (faculty)
- Ira Herst (medical school)
- W. McC James (editor-in-chief)
- E. S. J. McAllister (law school)
- J. P. McConnell (graduate school)
- Raleigh C. Minor (faculty)
- James Morris Page (faculty)
- J. H. Pollard (medical school)
- G. B. Smedley (law school)
- L. C. M. Smythe (academic school)
- G. C. Tabb (law school)
- Adrian S. Taylor (college-at-large)
- Albert S. Tuttle (faculty)
- J. I. Viney (academic school)
- Frank Watkins (college-at-large)
- J. W. Wayland (graduate school)
- Roger B. Wood (debating team)

The members decided on the name Raven Society, in honor of the poem by Edgar Allan Poe, who attended the University of Virginia in 1826. The society was originally considered a ribbon society because its members wore identifying ribbons. Its second class of members was announced on June 1, 1905. In November 1906, the society donated $10 ($358 in 2022 money) to a fund to create a statue of Poe in Richmond, Virginia; this was the first gift to the Poe Memorial Fund.

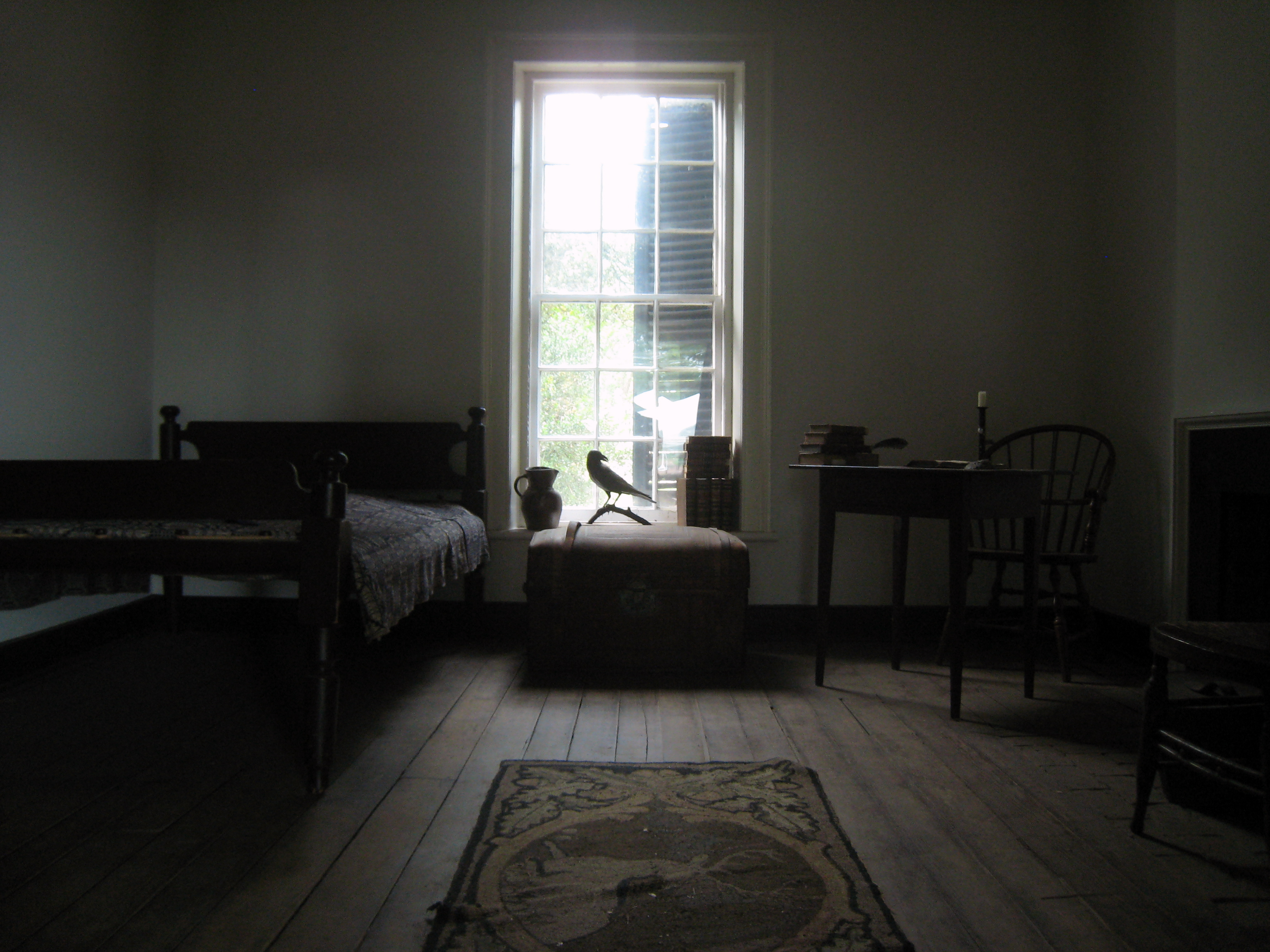
Range room of Edgar Allan Poe at the University of Virginia

The Raven Society has been active in commemorating Poe's life, including helping to plan the celebration of his centenary in January 1909. In February 1908, the university's Board of Visitors assigned the care at 13 West Range, Poe's room as a student, to the Raven Society. The society used the room as its meeting place and also began work on restoring the room as a museum. They also acquired a collection of Poe's works, to be kept in the room. The Ravens served as room guides during the centenary.

The society opened Poe's preserved room, which they had furnished with "a settee from the Allan home in Richmond" as well as "a real raven, stuffed, [which] looked down from a coign of the room." In 1924, architecture professor Edmund S. Campbell helped the society restore the room.

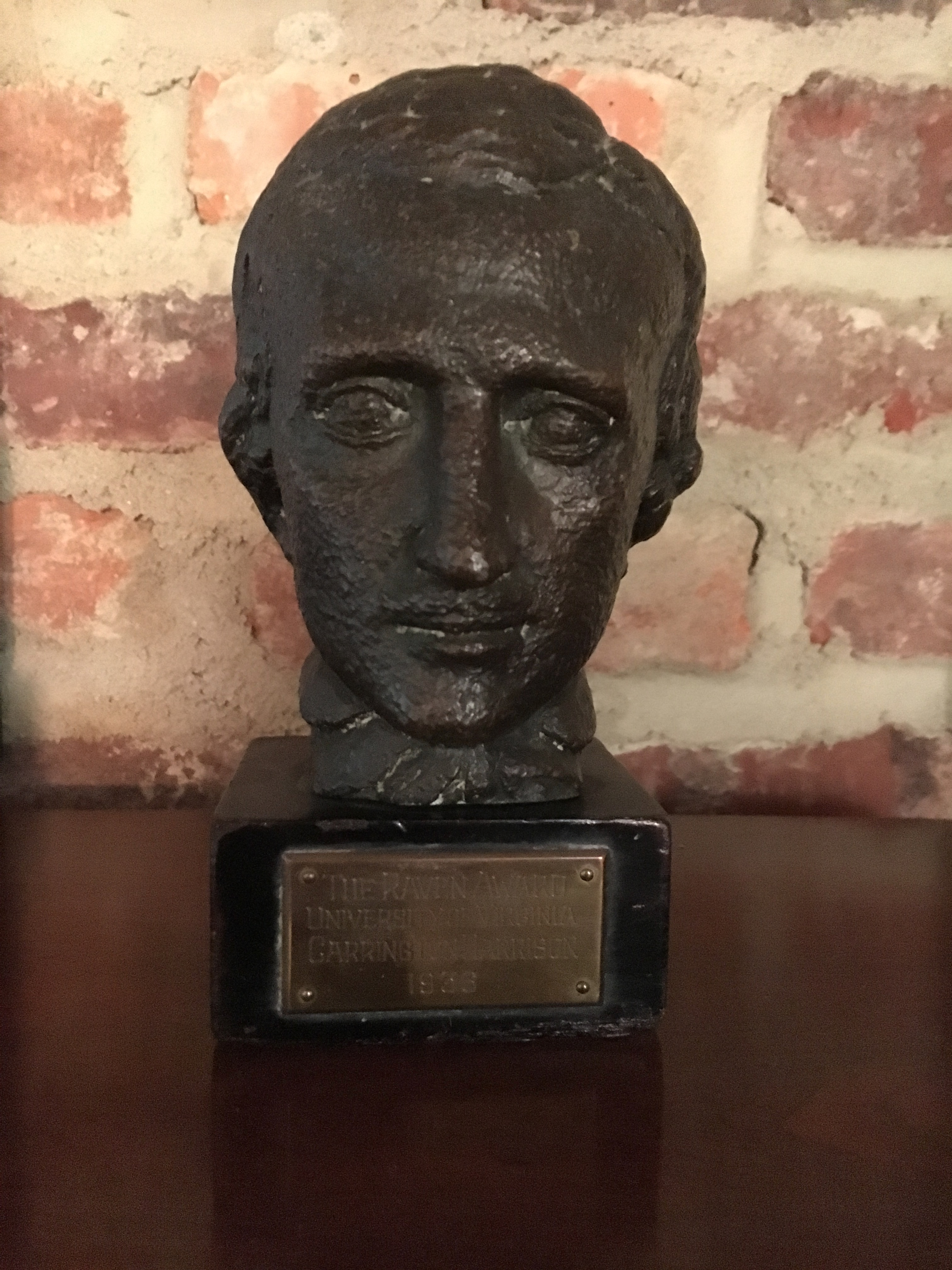
Raven Award with inscription - "The Raven Award, University of Virginia, Carrington Harrison, 1936"

In 1933, the society started its Raven Award program to recognize outstanding contributions of students and faculty. The original award was in the form of a bust of Edgar Allan Poe, based on a larger bronze sculpture commissioned with artist Harold Cash and first shown at commencement in April 1933. John Lloyd Newcomb, president University of Virginia, was the first recipient of the Raven Award. Other notable recipients include Edward L. Ayers, Colgate Darden, Nicole Hurd, and John Strangfeld.

The Raven Society also celebrated Poe's bicentenary in 2009 by laying three roses and drinking cognac in 13 West Range. In 2011, it received a grant from the UVa Alumni Association for the restoration of 13 West Range.

== Symbols and traditions ==
The Raven Society's name came from "The Raven", a narrative poem by Edgar Allan Poe, who attended the University of Virginia in 1826. The society's emblem is a black enamel raven mounted upon a gold-colored base. Members are referred to as the Ravens.

The society's Initiation takes place in 13 West Range, Poe's former room. Members declaim of Poe's works and stanzas from "The Raven" as part of the initiation ceremony. Initiates sign their name in a book using a quill. When inducted, new members must write a parody of "The Raven".

== Activities ==
Annually, the society presents Raven Fellowships to support undergraduate and graduate research projects. The society recognizes service and contributions to the University of Virginia by honor students, faculty, administrators and alumni with its Raven Award. The society is also responsible for the upkeep of Poe's student quarters on at 13 West Range at the University of Virginia.

== Membership ==
The society recruits members when they are juniors, seniors, or first or second-year graduate students. Potential members must demonstrate academic distinction. Initiation takes place at midnight. Fewer than thirty students are initiated each year.

== Notable members ==
Notable members of the Raven Society include:

- Charles Greenleaf Bell, scholar, poet and writer
- Staige D. Blackford, journalist who edited the Virginia Quarterly Review
- L. D. Britt, professor of surgery at the Eastern Virginia Medical School
- James O. Browning, district judge of the United States District Court for the District of New Mexico
- M. Caldwell Butler, Virginia General Assembly and the United States House of Representatives
- Robert Young Button, Attorney General of Virginia and Virginia Senate
- Mortimer Caplin, Commissioner of Internal Revenue and professor emeritus at the University of Virginia
- George M. Cochran, justice of the Virginia Supreme Court and member of the Virginia Senate, and Virginia House of Delegates
- Gary Cuozzo, professional football player with the Baltimore Colts
- Douglas Day, biographer, novelist, critic, University of Virginia professor
- Bascom S. Deaver, physicist and academic
- Claire Guthrie Gastanaga, first woman Chief Deputy Attorney General of Virginia and former Executive Director of the Virginia ACLU
- Armistead Mason Dobie, dean of the University of Virginia School of Law, circuit judge of the U.S. Court of Appeals for the Fourth Circuit, and judge the U.S. District Court for the Western District of Virginia
- John S. Edwards, Senate of Virginia
- S. Bernard Goodwyn, chief justice of the Supreme Court of Virginia
- Kossen Gregory, member of the Virginia House of Delegates
- Lapsley W. Hamblen Jr., judge of the United States Tax Court
- Frank Hereford, president of the University of Virginia
- C. Harrison Mann, Virginia House of Delegates
- Ernest Mead, professor of music at the University of Virginia
- W. Tayloe Murphy Jr., Virginia House of Delegates and Virginia Secretary of Natural Resources
- Charles S. Russell, senior justice of the Supreme Court of Virginia
- D. French Slaughter Jr., United States House of Representatives and Virginia House of Delegates
- John Strangfeld, former chairman, chief executive officer, and president of Prudential Financial
- Gilbert J. Sullivan, director of the University of Virginia Alumni Association for 35 years
- Alexander Theroux, novelist and poet
- F. Palmer Weber, activist and member of Franklin D. Roosevelt's New Deal group known as the Brain Trust
- Robert Whitehead, Virginia House of Delegates
- Henry H. Whiting, justice of the Supreme Court of Virginia
- Murat W. Williams, Ambassador to El Salvador

== See also ==
- Allusions to Poe's "The Raven"
- History of the University of Virginia
- University of Virginia fraternities and sororities
- University of Virginia secret societies
