= John Strangfeld =

American businessman

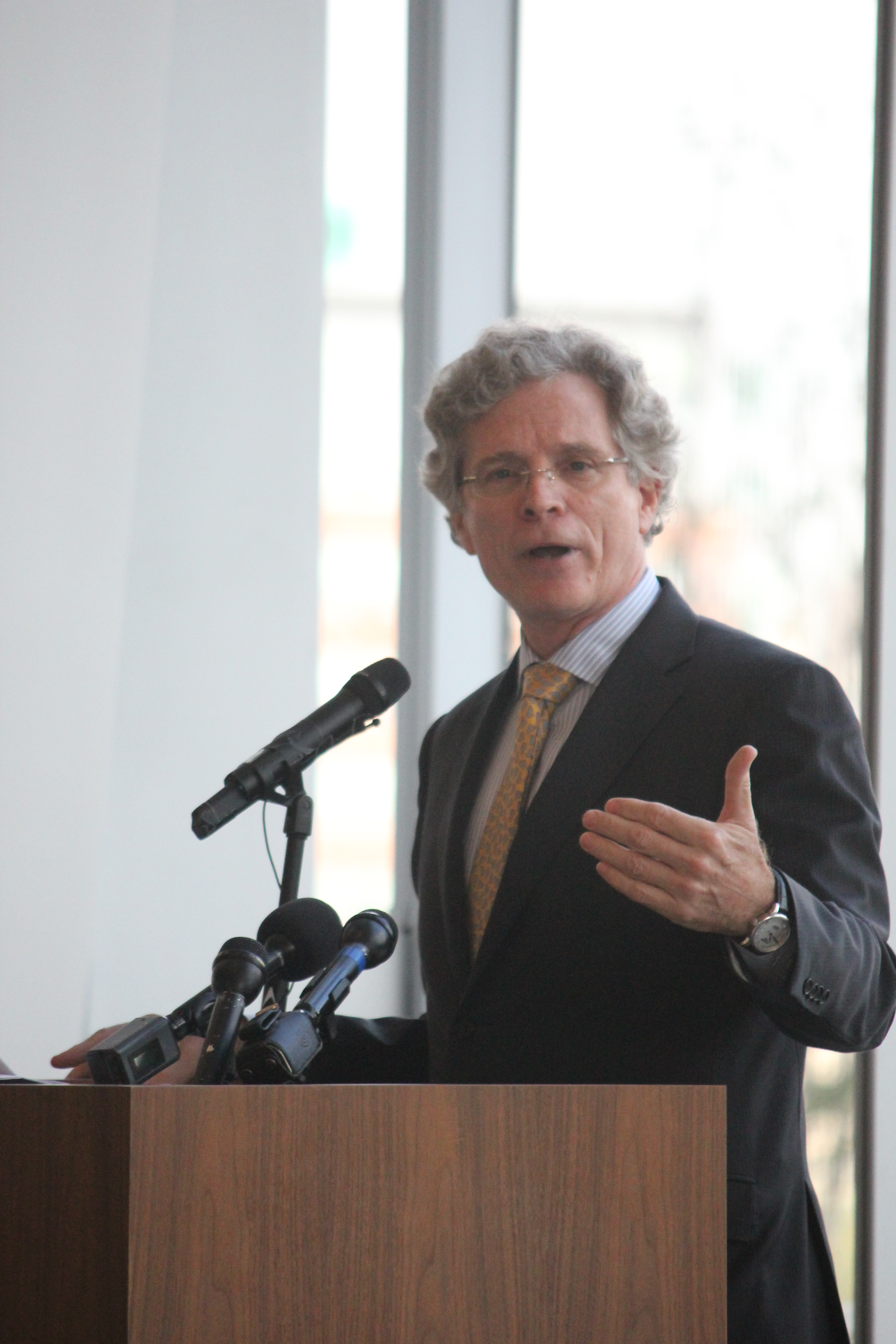
John Strangfeld in September 2015

John R. Strangfeld is an American businessman. He is the former chairman, chief executive officer, and president of Prudential Financial.

== Career ==
Strangfeld has been with Prudential since July 1977, serving in various management positions, including the executive in charge of Prudential's Global Asset Management Group since 1996, senior managing director of The Private Asset Management Group from 1995 to 1996, and chairman at PRICOA Capital Group (London) Europe from 1989 to 1995. Strangfeld was appointed CEO of Prudential Financial in 2008.

Strangfeld is also a member of the Raven Society, the oldest and most prestigious honorary society at the University of Virginia. He holds the Chartered Financial Analyst designation. Strangfeld was on the board of trustees at Susquehanna University from 1999 until February 2017 when he became an emeritus board member.

== Education ==
Strangfeld received a B.S. in business administration from Susquehanna University and an M.B.A. from the Darden School of Business at the University of Virginia. He was the keynote speaker at the 2017 Susquehanna University commencement ceremony, in which he received an honorary Doctor of Humane Letters degree alongside two other speakers.

== Compensation ==
While CEO of Prudential Financial in 2008, John Strangfeld earned a total compensation of $16,302,184, which included a base salary of $970,769, a cash bonus of $3,300,000, stocks granted of $7,207,765, and options granted of $4,678,905.
