= Z Society =

Secret society at University of Virginia, US

- Founded: 1892; 134 years ago University of Virginia
- Type: Secret
- Affiliation: Independent
- Status: Active
- Scope: Local
- Chapters: 1
- Headquarters: Charlottesville, Virginia; United States

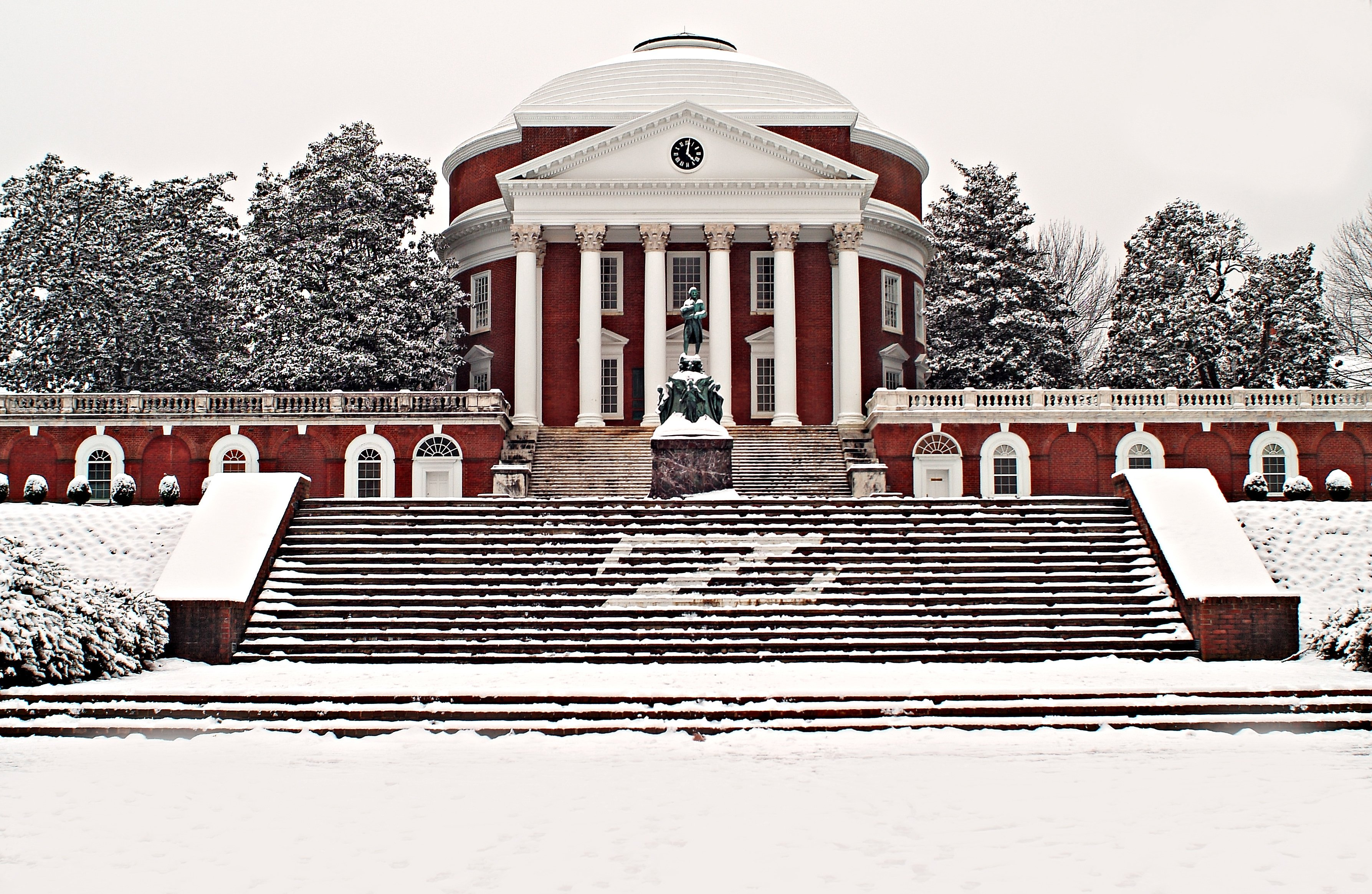
North steps of the Rotunda, with Z Society logo

The Z Society is a secret society that was founded at the University of Virginia in 1892.

The organization's membership chooses to remain anonymous because of the belief that service when provided anonymously, provides a unique philanthropic opportunity. After graduation, members may opt to wear Z Society rings. Selection for membership is considered an honor at the university.

The Z Society contributes significantly to the university through monetary donations, recognition events, such as a First-Year Recognition Dinner, service opportunities, encouragement letters, and major awards such as the Edgar Shannon Award, presented to one student from each school during graduation, as well as the Distinguished Faculty Award, presented to one faculty member from the university every year.

Like the Seven Society and IMP Society, the Z Society is known to paint its symbol around university grounds.

== History ==
The Z Society was founded in 1892 in the wake of a series of disputes between the Eli Banana society and the faculty and board of visitors of the university. According to University historian Philip Alexander Bruce, the society was formed to "skim the cream" from the Elis and T.I.L.K.A.; by his estimation, some 90% of the membership of the Z (or "Zetas," as he refers to them) were "in society," that is, of social distinction.

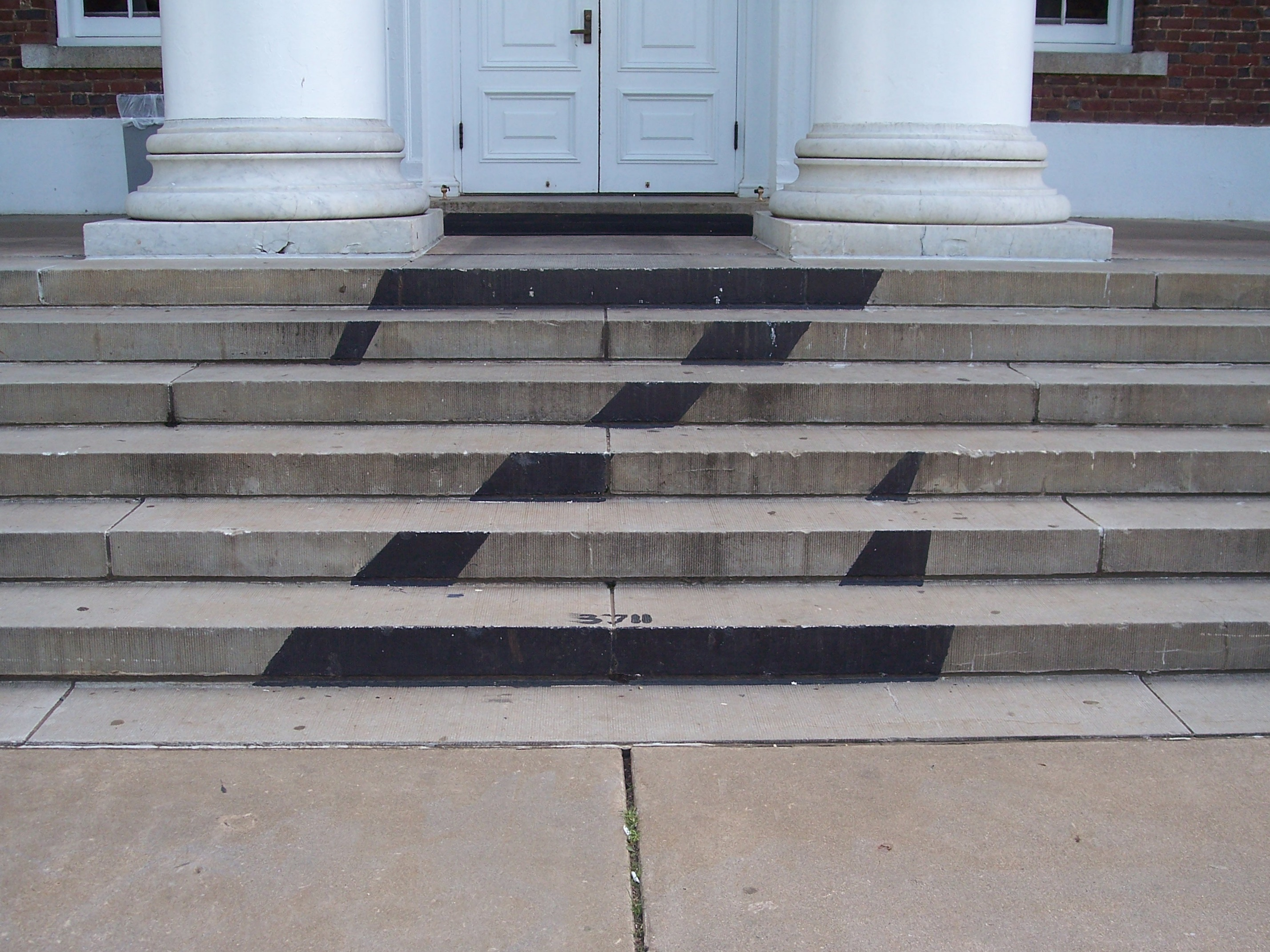
The Z Society sign in black on the steps to Old Cabell Hall

The early Z Society, along with Eli Banana and T.I.L.K.A., was a "ribbon society," one whose members were denoted by a cloth ribbon worn on the lapel. In 1906, it was described as the "most secret ribbon organization," though by 1969 it was described as "semi-secret."

Over time, the Z Society began a tradition of philanthropy around the school for which they are remembered today. Past gifts to the university include an annual fund for the purchase of books at Alderman Library, established in honor of University professor, dean, and Z Society member Robert Kent Gooch at his retirement in 1964; a scholarship in honor of University president Edgar F. Shannon Jr., established in 1973; the Z Society Distinguished Faculty Award, for professors who contributed to the community beyond their academic responsibilities, established in 1972; and the Z Society Award for Organizations, dating from 1971 or before.

In recent years, the Z Society has been outspoken in support of diversity in the university community, symbolically painting its white Z symbols black in response to an alleged 2003 hate crime; and writing letters of support to organizations that support Jewish student life at the University and in Charlottesville. In January 2015, the Z Society donated $30,000 to UVA's Faculty Forward program to promote "exceptional teaching, engaged learning and strategic research" at the university.

== Notable members ==
Notable members of the Z Society include:

- George M. Cochran, Virginia House of Delegates and Senate of Virginia, Supreme Court of Virginia
- W. Douglas Gordon, newspaper editor and critic
- Gilbert J. Sullivan, director of the UVA Alumni Association

== Controversies ==
The Z Society received international publicity in 2016 when University of Virginia student Otto Warmbier was convicted in North Korea of stealing a propaganda sign from his Pyongyang hotel while on a vacation. Warmbier said in a press conference hosted by North Korean authorities that he had been promised membership in the society in exchange for the theft. The society denied the allegation and any connection with Warmbier.

== See also ==
- Secret societies at the University of Virginia
- Collegiate secret societies in North America
