= Gilbert J. Sullivan =

American academic (1928–2009)

Gilbert J. "Gilly" Sullivan (July 5, 1928, in Fredericksburg, Virginia – January 5, 2009, in Charlottesville, Virginia) was the longtime director of the University of Virginia Alumni Association for 35 years. Appointed to the position in 1958 after the retirement of J. Malcolm "Mack" Luck, Sullivan remained in the position until his retirement in 1993. During his years at the Alumni Association, he helped develop the Virginia Student Aid Foundation (now the Virginia Athletics Foundation) and significant expansion of the Jefferson Scholarship Program.

Sullivan attended the university as an undergraduate and received his B.S. in Commerce in 1948. While a student he was a varsity quarterback in football and was a member of Omicron Delta Kappa, T.I.L.K.A., the Z Society, the Raven Society, and Sigma Alpha Epsilon social fraternity.

Sullivan was a director emeritus of the Jefferson Scholars Foundation and a trustee emeritus of the University of Virginia College of Arts & Sciences Foundation. Additionally, he served in the United States National Guard, attaining the rank of Major General and serving as the brigade commander of the 116th Infantry Regiment from 1983 to 1985.

In his years as director of the alumni association, Sullivan was remembered for assisting numerous students, both individually and through assistance to student organizations. Three scholarships in his name continue that tradition. The Gilbert J. Sullivan Scholarship is awarded every year by the UVA Parents Committee to a current, non-legacy rising third year student who currently receives financial aid from the Office of Financial Aid and has a demonstrated record of citizenship, leadership, academic achievement and financial need. The Z Society endows a Gilbert J. Sullivan Internship Scholarship, awarded to a returning undergraduate student and "intended to provide an opportunity to take a summer internship otherwise unattainable because of financial constraints." Also, the Jefferson Scholars Foundation maintains an endowed scholarship in the name of Ann Vernon and Gilbert J. Sullivan.

Other organizations honor Sullivan's memory. The Gilbert J. Sullivan Distinguished Service Award, awarded "to an individual whose tireless efforts, selfless dedication, and continuing support have contributed in a significant way to the success of the Virginia Glee Club," is named in honor of Sullivan's efforts to ensure the Virginia Glee Club's continued existence when it separated from the McIntire Department of Music in the late 1980s.

== See also ==
- Jefferson Scholarship
