= Amphilis Throckmorton Middlemore =

British author and teacher

- Born: 14 April 1891; Selly Oak, Birmingham England
- Died: 18 July 1931 (aged 40)
- Education: Somerville College, Oxford

Amphilis Throckmorton Middlemore (14 April 1891 – 18 July 1931) was a British writer and teacher.

With her friend Dorothy L. Sayers, she founded The Mutual Admiration Society at Somerville College, Oxford, had some writing published, and was an English teacher at Bryn Mawr College, Pennsylvania, where she launched plays and acted in them.

After Bryn Mawr she worked at Swarthmore College, Pennsylvania, teaching English from 1922 to 1928.

Her distinctive first two names had become part of the family in the 15th century when a Richard and a Thomas Middlemore had both married into the Throckmorton family and a John Middlemore had married Amphillis Goodwin.

She died on 18 July 1931, as reported by the college's newspaper, The Swarthmore Phoenix.

She was daughter of MP Sir John Middlemore, niece of Thomas Middlemore, and cousin of artist Emily Parker Groom.
