= IMP Society =

Secret society at University of Virginia, US

- Founded: 1902; 123 years ago University of Virginia
- Type: Secret
- Affiliation: Independent
- Status: Active
- Scope: Local
- Motto: Forsan et haec olim meminissi juvabit "And perhaps at some future time it may be pleasant to remember these incidents"
- Member badge
- Chapters: 1
- Headquarters: 211 Emmet Street S Charlottesville, Virginia 22903; United States
- Website: aig.alumni.virginia.edu/imp/

IMP Society inscriptions on the entrance to New Cabell Hall

The IMP Society is a secret society at the University of Virginia in Charlottesville, Virginia, United States that is notable for combining philanthropy and public mischief.

== History ==
The IMP Society was founded in 1902 as a society called the Hot Feet. The society was known primarily for its public ceremonies in which it crowned the society's "king". The Hot Feet were disbanded in 1908 under pressure from the university's Administrative Council, who called the society "very detrimental to the University's welfare" and banned it, along with "all other organizations which promote disorder in the University."

Although the society returned, it was to be disbanded once more; university historian Virginius Dabney records the final activity of the society as the 1911 distribution of stuffed animal specimens from the natural history museum about Grounds on Easter Sunday, and the assault of a student in his room.

The society reconstituted itself in 1913 as the IMP Society and remains active.

== Symbols and traditions ==
Current members wear a ring often recognized by their ring with the face of a devil on it, indicating their membership in the organization. Like the Seven Society and Z Society, the IMP Society is known to paint its symbol around university grounds.

Its motto is Forsan et haec olim meminissi juvabit or “And perhaps at some future time it may be pleasant to remember these incidents,” a phrase lifted from Vergil's Aeneid.

== Activities ==
The IMP Society engages in philanthropic activities around the University, presenting the IMP Award, given "to a faculty member who had been outstanding in promoting student-faculty relations and perpetuating the traditions of the university", and the IMP Student-Athlete Award, given at graduation to a female athlete who has excelled in both the field and the classroom; and a recent student social justice-oriented community service fellowship. However, much of the group's community service works are not widely publicized.

In addition to philanthropy, IMPs are known to march around the grounds carrying pitchforks, wearing horned hoods, and engaging in mild mischief and revelry. In 2004, the group was forced to apologize after using gasoline to start a bonfire on the Lawn during a nighttime ceremony.

== Membership ==
Members of the IMP Society are more public than other societies at the university. The society publicly "taps" its new members and its members wear an identifying ring.

== Notable members ==
Notable IMP and Hot Feet alumni include:

- Ronde Barber, professional football player
- Tiki Barber, professional football player and media spokesperson
- Joe Harris, professional basketball player
- Ralph Sampson, professional basketball player
- Fran Crippen, long-distance swimmer
- James Rogers McConnell, Lafayette Escardrille pilot and the inspiration for Gutzon Borglum's statue The Aviator

== See also ==
- Secret societies at the University of Virginia
- Collegiate secret societies in North America
