= The Yellow Journal =

University publication

- Categories: Satirical Magazine; Internet Humor Website
- Circulation: ~3,000
- Publisher: University of Virginia
- First issue: 1912
- Country: USA
- Language: English
- Website: https://yellowjournal.lol/

The Yellow Journal is a satirical student-run publication at The University of Virginia. Similar to Harvard's Harvard Lampoon, The Yellow Journal is the longest-running, though not continuously published, humor and satire publication at Jefferson's university. The Yellow Journal's overarching outlook was summarized early on by The New York Times, which in a 1913 edition wrote, "The Yellow Journal [...] did not spare individuals, events or institutions in its ridicule and quips. It was well illustrated with appropriate cartoons. The character of the sheet can be best gathered from its motto, which is one of Mark Twain's witticisms: Truth is precious--therefore economize with it."

== Original run ==
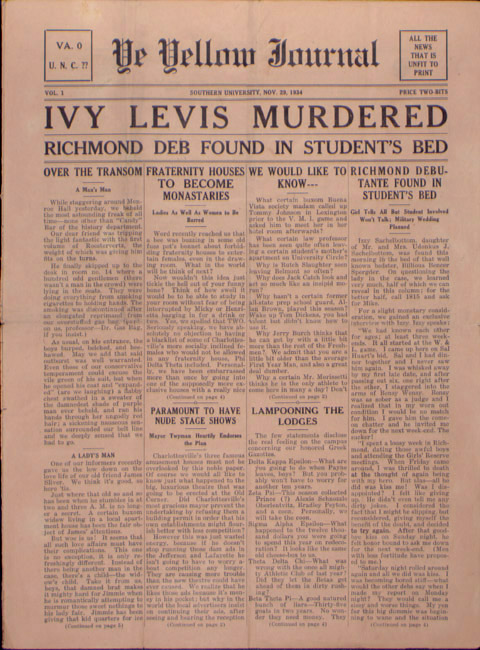
1934 Yellow Journal

Inspired by yellow journalism, the first issue of The Yellow Journal was published in 1912 and appeared annually from 1920 through 1934 under the slogan "All The News That Is Unfit To Print". In its 1912 incarnation, the journal was sponsored by Sigma Delta Chi, the journalistic fraternity, but beginning in 1920 the journal was unaffiliated with Sigma Delta Chi; in fact, all articles were published anonymously.

The newspaper's outlandish headlines regarding prominent members of the university community caused a stir among the faculty and administration, and "Ye Yellow Journal" was denounced by some as being "inconsistent with the ideals and traditions of the University of Virginia." The satirical content was apparently less controversial than the broadsheet's anonymity; in 1928, the faculty senate adopted a resolution that viewed "with profound disapprobation anonymous publications," and "earnestly request[ed] the students responsible" to cease publication. When the Journal's editors stated an intent to omit references to the faculty from further issues, university professors stated that the principal objection was the paper's anonymity.

The Yellow Journal was discontinued in 1934, when the University's Administrative Council set forth an order forbidding "the publication or sale of any anonymous paper, and [we] desire to record our unanimous condemnation of the recent number of The Yellow Journal as scurrilous and indecent in the extreme."

== 1980/90s revival ==
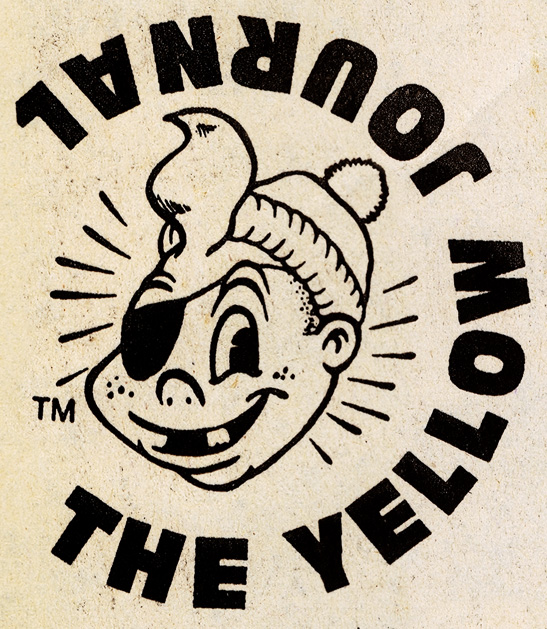
90s era Yellow Journal logo

In 1986, The Yellow Journal, or "YJ", was resurrected as a university-funded, student-run publication, published three times per semester. Students Walter Alcorn and Andy Metcalf obtained the student council funding to re-launch the publication, and formatted The Yellow Journal as a magazine instead of a newspaper. This new incarnation featured a slightly more intellectual approach to college humor magazines than was found at other schools, and reflected the pithy, politically minded humor of alternative 1990s counterculture. During this period, the Journal featured the early work of underground cartoonists Jen Sorensen and M. Wartella, among others.

The Yellow Journal gained national notoriety when it was featured on an episode of PBS' MacNeil/Lehrer NewsHour. The program was debating the Supreme Court case of Rosenberger v. University of Virginia, and the constitutionality of whether a government-funded school had the authority to withhold funding from the Christian publication Wide Awake while simultaneously granting funding to other publications such as The Yellow Journal, "a humor magazine that has targeted Christianity as a subject of satire." The Yellow Journal also included satire of atheists, philosophers, and many other religions.

Despite a successful run throughout the 1990s, The Yellow Journal ceased publication in 1999.

== Current revival ==
In December 2010 a new issue appeared at various locations around Grounds, and since then a new issue has been distributed right before finals week each semester. The current incarnation is similar to the original run in that it features fake news and centers on life at the university. It is different in that, unlike the 1980s/1990s version, they publish anonymously.

== Mottos ==
Throughout the decades, the Journal utilized many various slogans and mottos, including (but not limited to):

- "All The News That Is Unfit To Print" 1912
- "Truth is precious--therefore economize with it." 1913
- "Be Not Hasty in the Spirit To Be Angry, For Anger Resteth In The Bosom of Fools." 1921
- "Silence Is The Journal's Thunder. To Be Ignored By The Journal Is Ignominy." 1921, 1992, 1993
- "Quidquid discipuli disciplulorum in usum pepentistis, frustum eius hic videstis. (Your student activity fees at work.)" 1987, 1992, 1993
- "Definitively inaccurate since 1912" 2010-2016
- "Economizing the Truth since 1912" 2016-Present
