= Seven Society =

Secret society at University of Virginia, US

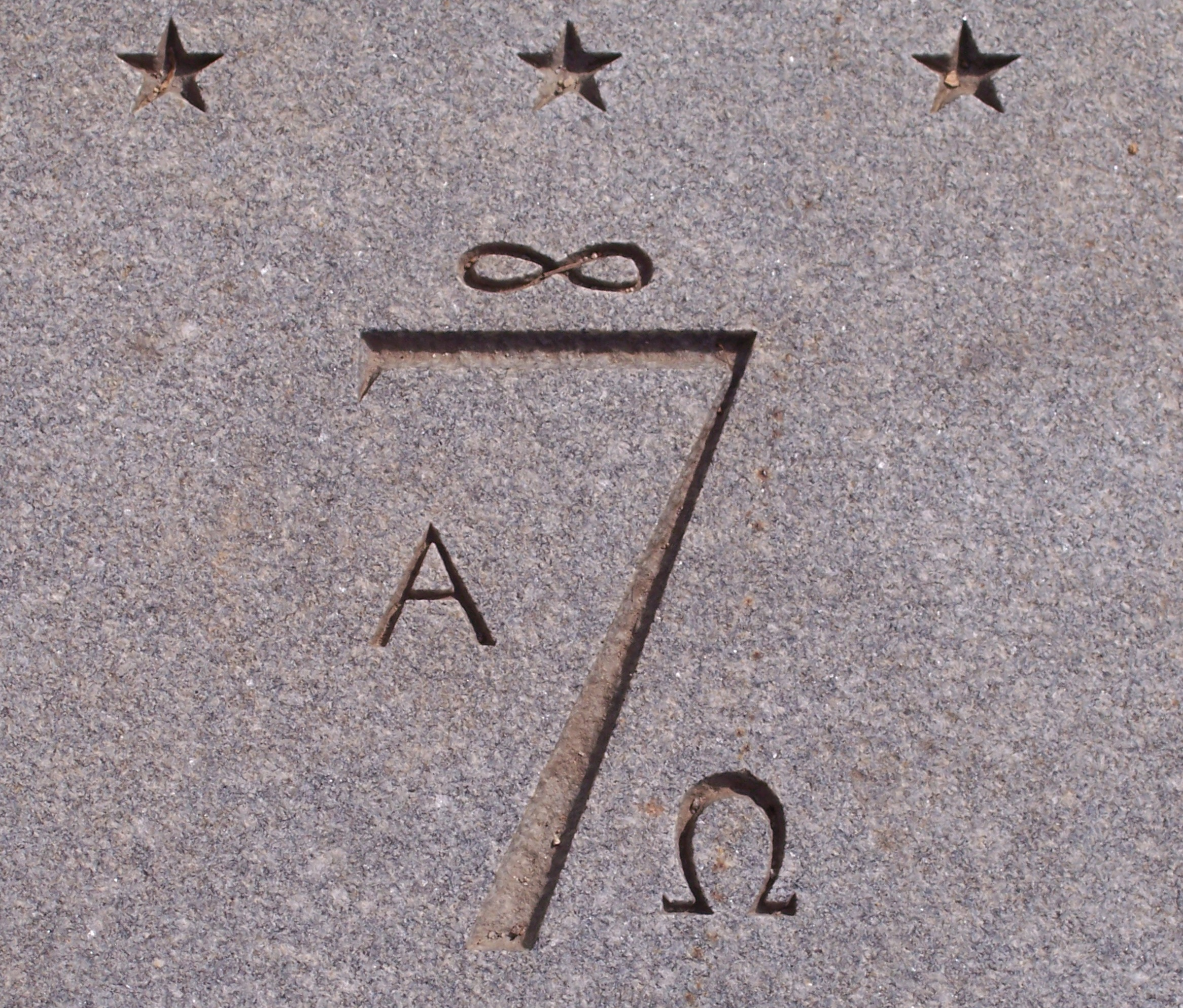
- Seven Society sign on a plaque outside Old Cabell Hall
- Founded: 1905; 121 years ago University of Virginia
- Type: Secret
- Affiliation: Independent
- Status: Active
- Scope: Local
- Symbol: Infinity sign and the number 7
- Chapters: 1
- Headquarters: Charlottesville, Virginia; United States

The Seven Society (founded 1905) is the most secretive of the University of Virginia's secret societies. Members are only revealed after their death when a wreath of black magnolias in the shape of a "7" is placed at the gravesite, the bell tower of the University Chapel chimes at seven-second intervals on the seventh dissonant chord when it is seven past the hour, and a notice is published in the university's Alumni News, and often in the Cavalier Daily. The most visible tradition of the society is the painting of the logo of the society, the number 7 surrounded by the signs for alpha (A), omega (Ω), and infinity (∞), and sometimes several stars, upon many buildings around the grounds of the university.

There is no clear history of the founding of the society. There is a legend that, of eight men who planned to meet for a card game, only seven showed up, and they formed the society. Other histories claim that the misbehavior of other secret societies, specifically the Hot Feet (later the IMP Society), led University President Edwin A. Alderman to call both the Hot Feet and the Z Society into his office and suggest that a more "beneficial organization" was needed.

The only known method to successfully contact the Seven Society is to place a letter at the Thomas Jefferson statue inside the university's historic Rotunda (accounts differ on the exact placement of the letter, either on the base or in the crook of the statue's arm).

== Philanthropic gifts ==
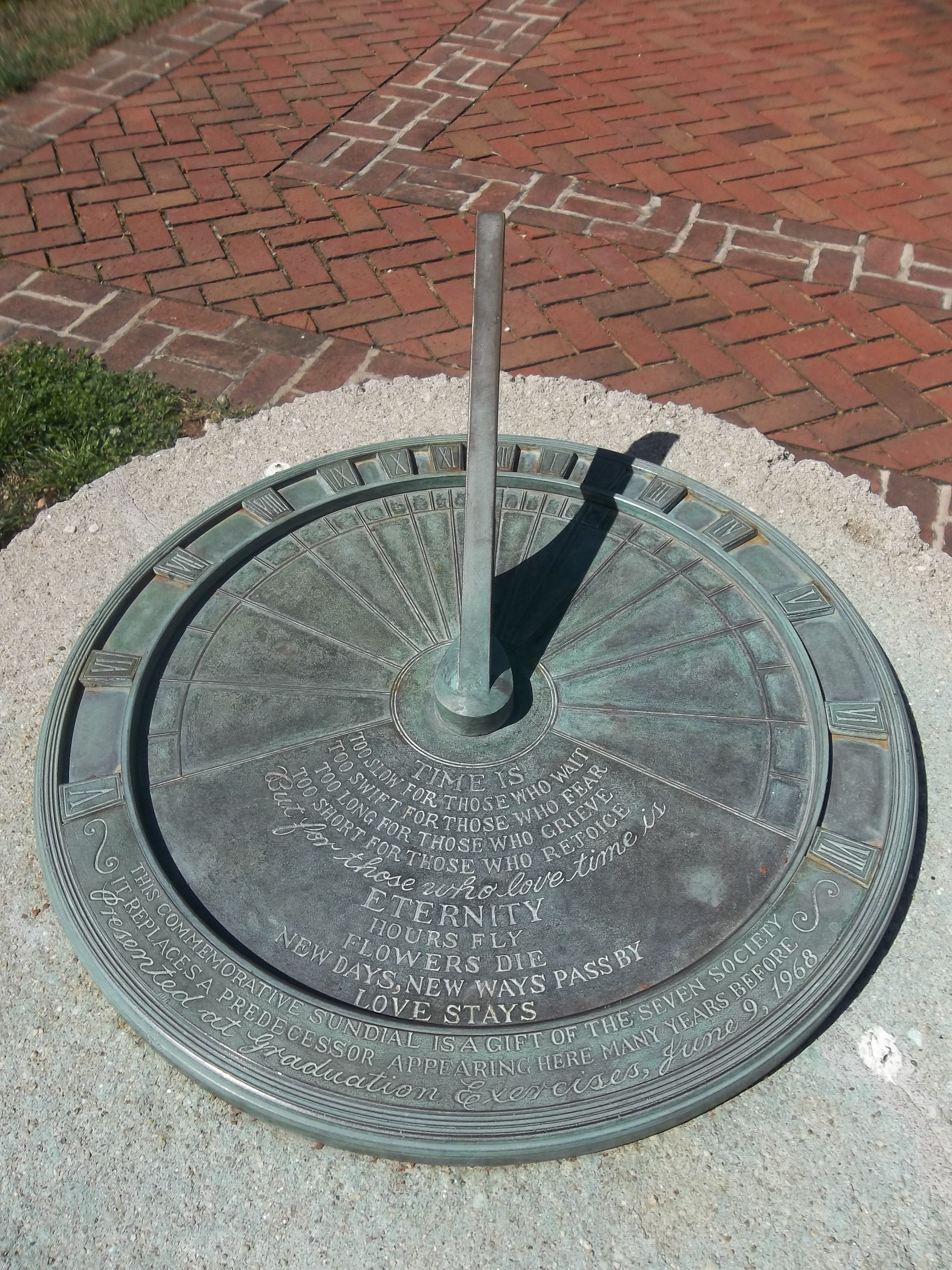
A sundial donated as a gift by the Seven Society

The group contributes financially to the university, announcing donations with letters signed only with seven astronomical symbols in the order: Earth, Jupiter, Mercury, Mars, Neptune, Uranus, and Venus. The society gives large monetary donations and scholarships to the university each year in quantities that include the number 7, e.g. $777 or $1,777. Significant past gifts to the university include the Seven Society Carillon in the UVA Chapel, donated in memory of deceased members of the society, and given with the request that there should be a toll of seven times seven bells on the passing of a member; a memorial to past Seven Society members who gave their lives in World War I; $17,777.77 for a loan fund in honor of university president John Lloyd Newcomb; the ceremonial mace carried in academic processions; $10,777.77 in support of the re-establishment of Homecomings; a plaque on the Rotunda honoring University students who died in the Korean War; $7,077.77 to endow the Ernest Mead Fund for the Music Library; $47,777.77 for the making of a film on the honor system; and $1 million in support of the university's South Lawn Project. Most recently, the society gave a $777,777.77 grant to fund the Mead Endowment, founded in honor of Ernest Mead, which awards grants to professors to teach their "dream classes."

In addition to granting spontaneous gifts, the Seven Society sponsors an annual $7,000 graduate fellowship award for superb teaching.

== Notable members ==
The Seven Society is unusual among University of Virginia secret societies in including members who were not students or alumni of the university. Notable examples include Mary Proffitt, secretary to Dean James M. Page and Dean Ivey F. Lewis; and Ivey F. Lewis himself, a non-alumnus professor and longtime dean of students at the university.

Several notable individuals whose Seven Society membership was disclosed at their death include:

- H. Lockwood Frizzell, professional football player with the Philadelphia Eagles
- William Halsey Jr., United States Navy admiral
- Frank Hereford, fifth president of the University of Virginia and namesake of Hereford College
- James Rogers McConnell, student and volunteer for the Lafayette Escadrille during World War I, memorialized in Gutzon Borglum's statue The Aviator
- Ernest Mead, professor of music and chair of the McIntire Department of Music at UVA
- John Lloyd Newcomb, second president of the University of Virginia
- Edward Stettinius, Jr., secretary of state under Presidents Roosevelt and Truman, and first US ambassador to the United Nations
- Frank Wisner, head of the Central Intelligence Agency's Directorate of Plans during the 1950s
- Joseph W. Twinam, United States Ambassador to Bahrain

== Other organizations ==
There have been several secret societies with "seven" in their name. No connection between the societies has been shown, but there is at least some tradition in the use of the names.

One such secret society is the Seven Society, Order of the Crown and Dagger at the College of William and Mary in Williamsburg, Virginia. The founding date of the William and Mary society is reported to have been as early as 1826.

The Mystical Seven was founded in 1837 at Wesleyan University in Middletown, Connecticut. It expanded to include eleven chapters or temples at other colleges and universities. The society died in 1890, with its surviving chapters merging into national fraternities. It was restarted as a local honorary at Wesleyan University in the late 19th century.

The Mystical Seven was founded in 1907 at the University of Missouri. It recognizes students who have demonstrated leadership and characters.

Another unassociated secret society operates at Longwood University. The society known as Princeps, was founded on seven principles of leadership. Members are selected during their undergraduate career and are not revealed until graduation by wearing a crimson sash bearing the number seven. The group recognizes and honors citizens of the Longwood community who are exceptional leaders and its motto is "to lead is to serve". Its symbol is a black seven-pointed crown and the number 7, representing the principles of leadership. Students often step on the black seven-pointed crowns painted around campus for good luck. Princeps attaches paper sevens to the doors of academic achieving students each semester; black sevens indicate dean's list and red sevens indicated president's list.

== See also ==
- Secret societies at the University of Virginia
- Collegiate secret societies in North America
- Skull and Bones (Yale University)
- Stewards Society (Georgetown University)
