= Eli Banana =

Secret society at University of Virginia

- Founded: November 30, 1878; 147 years ago University of Virginia
- Type: Secret
- Affiliation: Independent
- Status: Active
- Scope: Local
- Chapters: 1
- Headquarters: P.O. Box 400312; Charlottesville, Virginia 22904; United States
- Website: elibanana.org

Eli Banana, officially known as the Mystic Order of Eli Banana, is a secret society at the University of Virginia in Charlottesville, Virginia. Founded in 1878, it was the first and the oldest secret society at the university.

== History ==
=== Earlier groups ===
A secret political society of the same name existed in the nearby Shenandoah Valley in September 1877. This early group was led by Major R. W. Hunter of the Winchester Times and the Hon. Peter Magill, a politician of Rockingham County. In July 1879, the Richmond Dispatch reported that a secret society called Eli Banana had formed at the Virginia Military Institute and consisted of "very influential members."

Another group called Eli Banana existed at Yale University in the 1870s. When students from Yale and the University of Virginia spent the summer at a hotel in western Virginia as dance partners for the daughters of wealthy guests, the Yale students initiated the Virginia students into Eli Banana. When the students returned to Charlottesville in the fall, they formed a Virginia chapter of Eli Banana. The Yale group went defunct a few years later.

=== University of Virginia ===
The Mystic Order of Eli Banana was founded at the University of Virginia on November 30, 1878. Its purpose was to make its members leaders in the university community and to "create an association of congenial spirits among the students." Its founders wanted a "social leadership club" that was not the typical Greek letter fraternity. It was considered an honorary social society.

The Washington Star reported, "There was a big crowd of devil-may-care young men [at the University of Virginia], most of them with plenty of money, and they made Charlottesville and Albemarle fairly hum. These kindred spirits formed a society, which took the name of 'Eli Banana.'" In April 1874, Eli Banana had a boat crew that was training for the state competition.

By 1887, Eli Banana was the most powerful student organization on campus. It dominated the Jefferson Society and the Football Board and their semiformal affairs were reported to "outclass" those of the fraternities". Although noted for recruiting the best students on campus, the society also became infamous for its "drunken revelry", "bacchanalian" Easter dance, and pranks, including its members interrupting a church service with a drunken performance of their drinking song.

In 1894, the university's faculty required Eli Banana's members to sever their ties with the organization in writing before matriculating; this action was in response to complaints from both on and off the campus. However, the society simply changed its name to Peter Magill and continued its operations with the same membership structure. The university's board of visitors allowed it to reconstitute as Eli Banana in 1897.

== Symbols and traditions ==
Eli Banana is known as a ribbon society because its members wore organizational ribbons on their lapels. Its apocryphal lore says that its name came from "the Japanese Order of Eli Banana, to which only citizens of the highest rank were admitted." Its student leader is called the Grand Banana.

In the 1970s, the society's initiation included hooded men on campus who placed a cape over the shoulders and head of the initiate, followed by placing a bottle of wine to his lips and chanting:

Eli! Eli! I yell like hell – Eli!

Eli Banana! Starry banner! We are drunk boys,

Every one! 'Tis not the first time, nor yet the last time,

That together we have been on one hell of a bum.

== Activities ==
Eli Society's activities are rarely seen or known. It installed a plaque in honor of member and former faculty member, William Holding Echols, on Pavilion VIII in 1949. It established the Eli Banana Fund in 2003, consisting of more than $400,000 ($700072 adjusted for inflation) for university projects. As of June 2021, the fund includes more than $2.5 million ($2,970,343 adjusted for inflation).

In 2026, the organization pledged $2,000,000 to Aggarwal Hall to construct the Eli Banana Bar alongside a ballroom in the new home of the University’s alumni association.

== Notable members ==
Notable members of Eli Banana include:

- Jonathan Bryan, president of the Richmond-Ashland Railway Company and Bryan, Kemp & Co. brokerage firm
- Richard Evelyn Byrd Sr. (1880–1881), United States Attorney and Speaker of the Virginia House of Delegates
- William Holding Echols, mathematics professor at the University of Virginia
- George Fawcett (1878–1879), stage and film actor of the silent era
- Armistead C. Gordon, lawyer, writer of prose and poetry, and mayor of Staunton, Virginia
- W. Douglas Gordon, editor of The Norfolk Ledger-Dispatch
- Thomas W. Harrison (1878–1879), Senate of Virginia and in the United States House of Representatives
- Eppa Hunton IV, lawyer
- Paul Tudor Jones (1976), hedge fund billionaire
- Lawrence Lewis Jr., businessman, hotelier, and founder of Flagler College
- Richard Carter Scott (1879–1880), Attorney General of Virginia
- Spence Patrick Doherty (2025-2027), Active member of Charlottesville community

== See also ==
- Collegiate secret societies in North America
- Secret societies at the University of Virginia
