= Echols (surname) =

Echols is a surname. Notable people with the surname include:

- Alice Echols, American cultural critic and historian
- Antwun Echols (born 1971), American boxer
- Brandin Echols (born 1997), American football player
- Cameron Echols (born 1981), American basketball player
- Cameron Echols-Luper (born 1995), American football player
- Charlie Echols, American jazz trumpeter and bandleader
- Damien Echols (born 1974), one of the West Memphis Three
- Dorothy Jung Echols (1916–1977), American geologist
- Donnie Echols (born 1957), American football player
- Douglas Echols, American man wrongfully convicted of rape
- Drew Echols, American politician
- Edward Echols (1849–1914), American politician
- Emily Echols (born 1988), American jurist
- Fate Echols (1939–2002), American football player
- Harrison "Hatch" Echols (1933–1993), American molecular biologist, biochemist, and geneticist
- Jennifer Echols, American writer
- Joe Echols (1917–1977), American football coach
- John Echols (disambiguation) multiple people including:
  - John Echols (1823–1896), Confederate general
  - Johnny Echols (born 1947), American singer-songwriter and guitarist
  - Johnny Echols (baseball) (1917–1972), American baseball player
  - Jon Echols (born 1979), American politician
- Joseph Hubbard Echols (1816–1885), American politician
- Lathan Moses Echols (born 2002), better known as Lil Mosey, American rapper
- Leonard S. Echols (1871–1946), American politician
- Michael Echols, American politician
- Mike Echols (1944–2003), American writer
- Mike Echols (American football) (born 1978), American football player
- M. Patton Echols (1925–2012), American politician
- Odis Echols (1930–2013), American politician, radio broadcaster and lobbyist
- Oliver P. Echols (1892–1954), American military officer
- Paul C. Echols (1944–1994), American musicologist and conductor
- Power Echols (born 2003), American football player
- R. E. Echols, American politician from Oklahoma
- Robert L. Echols (born 1941), American judge
- Robert Milner Echols (1798–1847), American politician
- Sheila Echols (born 1964), American athlete
- Shelly Echols (born 1979), American politician
- Terry Echols (born 1962), American football player
- Tim Echols, American politician
- Vanessa Echols (born 1960), American television journalist
- William Echols (disambiguation)
  - William Holding Echols, American soldier (1834–1909)
  - William Holding Echols (1859–1934), American academic
