= National Register of Historic Places listings in Echols County, Georgia =

This is a list of properties and districts in Echols County, Georgia that are listed on the National Register of Historic Places (NRHP).

This National Park Service list is complete through NPS recent listings posted March 21, 2025.

== Current listings ==
	Name on the Register	Image	Date listed	Location	City or town	Description
1	Corbett Farm	Corbett Farm	December 1, 2000 (#00001455)	Rte 2; 30°41′36″N 83°06′29″W	Lake Park	Built ca. 1878-79
2	Statenville Consolidated School	Statenville Consolidated School	June 1, 1988 (#88000606)	GA 94; 30°42′11″N 83°01′28″W	Statenville	Built in 1931
