= Echols =

Echols may refer to:

- Echols (surname)
- Echols County, Georgia, a county in Georgia
- Echols, Kentucky, a community
- Echols, Minnesota, a community
