= Echols County School District =

School district in Georgia (U.S. state)

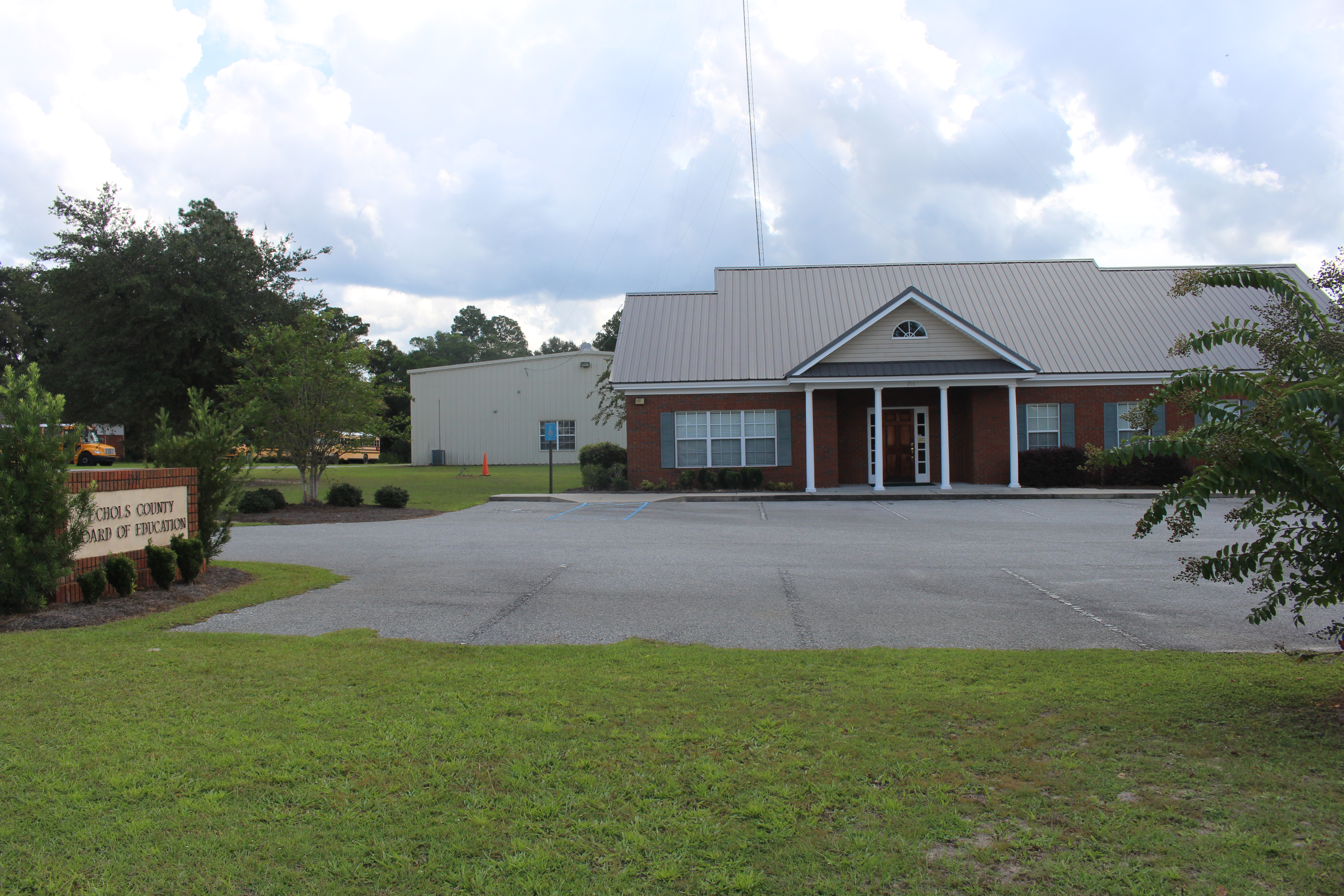
- District headquarters

Address
- 216 U.S. 129 Statenville, Georgia, 31648-2200; United States
- Coordinates: 31.379434°N 84.969978°W

District information
- Grades: Pre-school - 12
- Superintendent: Shannon C. King
- Accreditation(s): Southern Association of Colleges and Schools; Georgia Accrediting Commission

Students and staff
- Enrollment: 868
- Faculty: 48

Other information
- Website: www.echols.k12.ga.us

The Echols County School District is a public school district in Echols County, Georgia, United States, based in Statenville.

It is the only school district in the county. It serves the communities of Fruitland and Statenville.

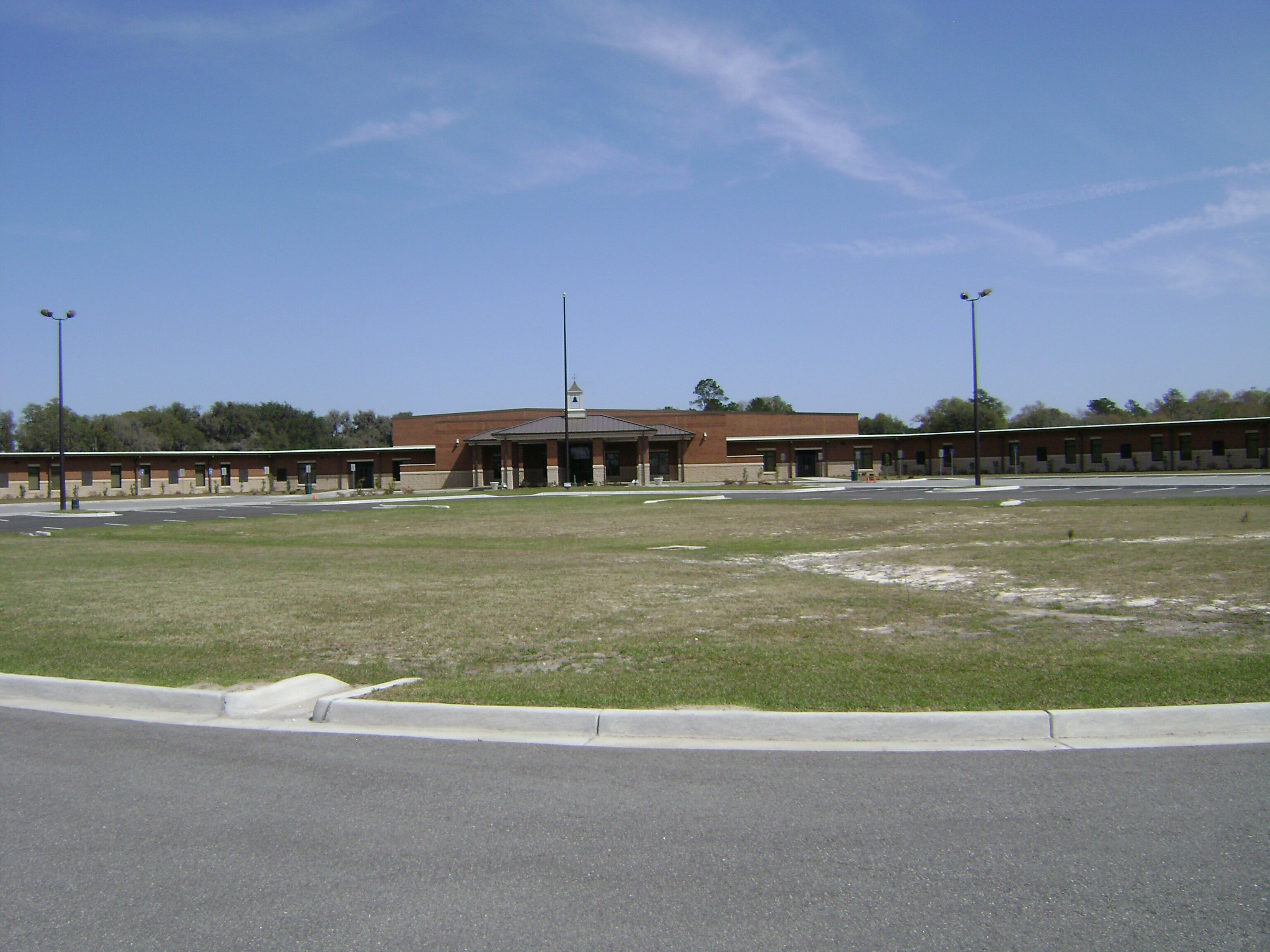
School building

== Schools ==
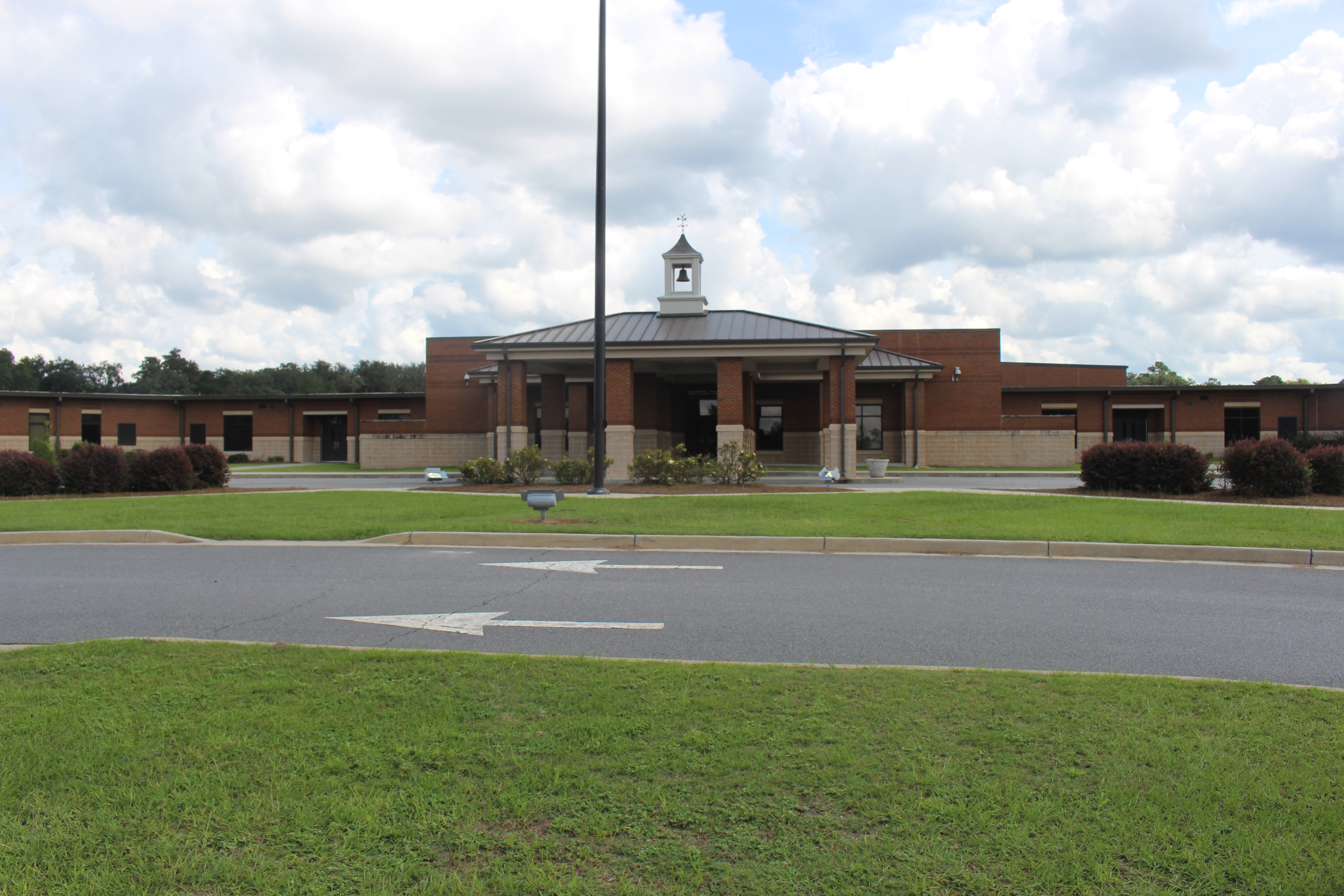
Elementary-Middle School building

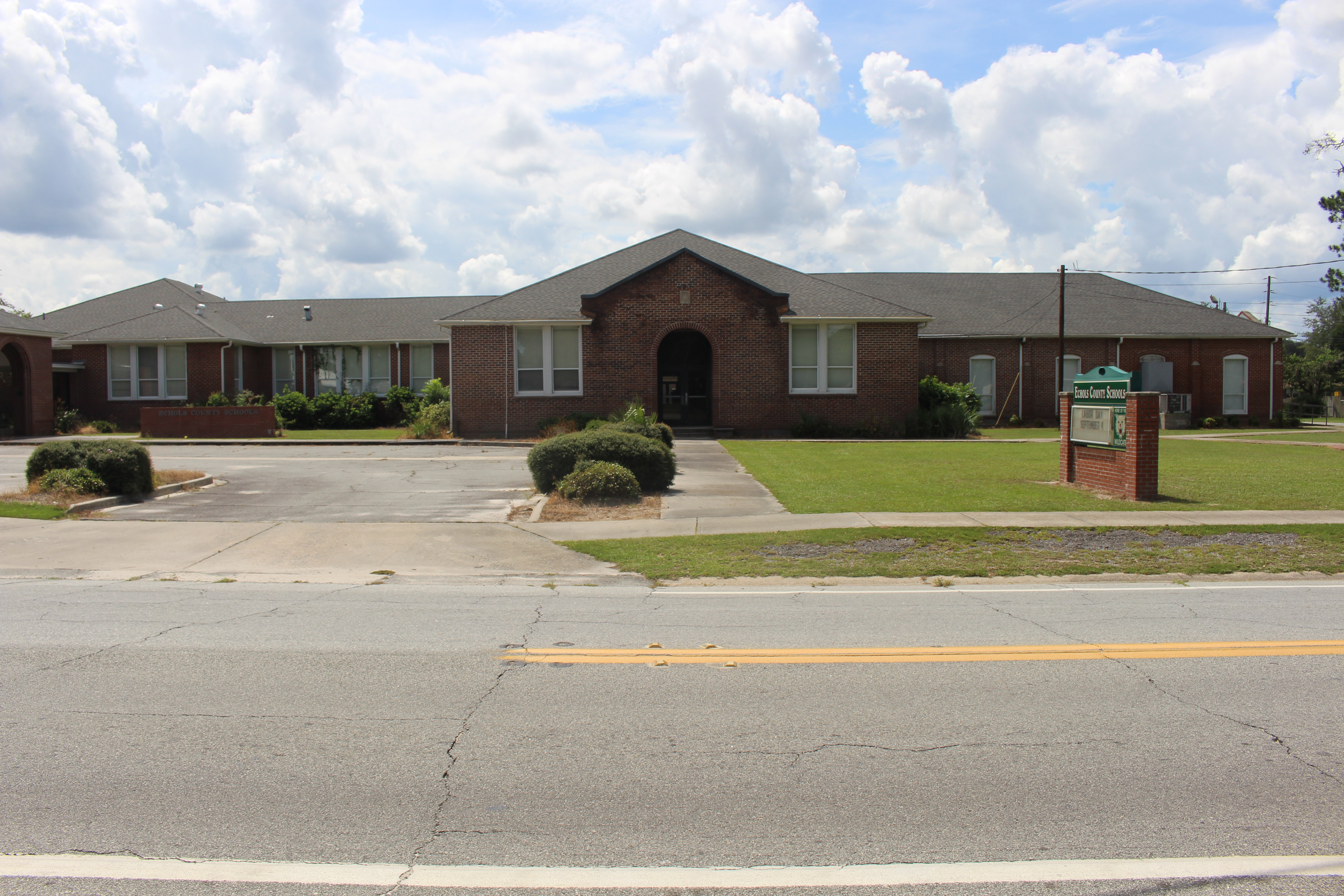
High school building

The Echols County School District has one elementary-middle-high school, all in one building.

The facilities are in unincorporated areas.

Schools:

- Echols County Elementary/Middle School
- Echols County High School

== Litigation ==
In 2020, the school district settled a racial discrimination case brought by a teacher who had been the only Black teacher in the district until she was fired in 2018 over alleged financial improprieties.
