= William Echols =

William Echols may refer to:

- William Holding Echols (soldier) (1834–1909), American soldier
- William Holding Echols (professor) (1859–1934), American academic
- William Echols (politician), member of the 1st Texas Legislature in 1846
