= Tarver, Georgia =

Coordinates: 30°42′06″N 82°55′27″W

Tarver is an extinct town in Echols County, in the U.S. state of Georgia. The GNIS classifies it as a populated place.

== History ==
The Georgia General Assembly incorporated Tarver as a town in 1887. The town's municipal charter officially was repealed in 1995.

The site of Tarver is along Georgia State Route 94 and the intersections with New Barnes Road and Will Rewis Road east of Statenville. The former right-of-way for the Atlantic Coast Line Railroad DuPont—Lakeland Line ran between the two intersections.
