= Georgia State Route 376 =

State highway in Georgia, United States

State Route 376
- SR 376 highlighted in red

Route information
- Maintained by GDOT
- Length: 16.0 mi (25.7 km)
- Existed: 1972–present

Major junctions
- West end: SR 31 in Clyattville
- I-75 west of Lake Park; US 41 / SR 7 in Lake Park
- East end: SR 135 west of Statenville

Location
- Country: United States
- State: Georgia
- Counties: Lowndes, Echols

Highway system
- Georgia State Highway System; Interstate; US; State; Special
← SR 375	→ SR 377

State Route 376 (SR 376) is a 16.0-mile-long (25.7 km) east–west state highway that travels within portions of Lowndes and Echols counties in the southern part of the U.S. state of Georgia. It connects Clyattville with the Statenville area, via Lake Park. The roadway was built in the late 1950s and designated as SR 376 in 1972.

== Route description ==
SR 376 begins at an intersection with SR 31 in Clyattville, within Lowndes County. The highway travels to the southeast and curves to the east. Later, it curves back to the southeast and makes a longer curve to the east-northeast. It has an interchange with Interstate 75 (I-75). The route continues to the east-northeast and enters the western part of Lake Park, where it intersects US 41/SR 7 (West Marion Avenue). The three highways travel concurrently into the main part of town, where SR 376 splits off to a generally east-northeastern direction. It travels through rural areas of Echols County, and crosses over the Alapahoochee River, until it meets its eastern terminus, an intersection with SR 135 west of Statenville.

SR 376 is not part of the National Highway System, a system of roadways important to the nation's economy, defense, and mobility.

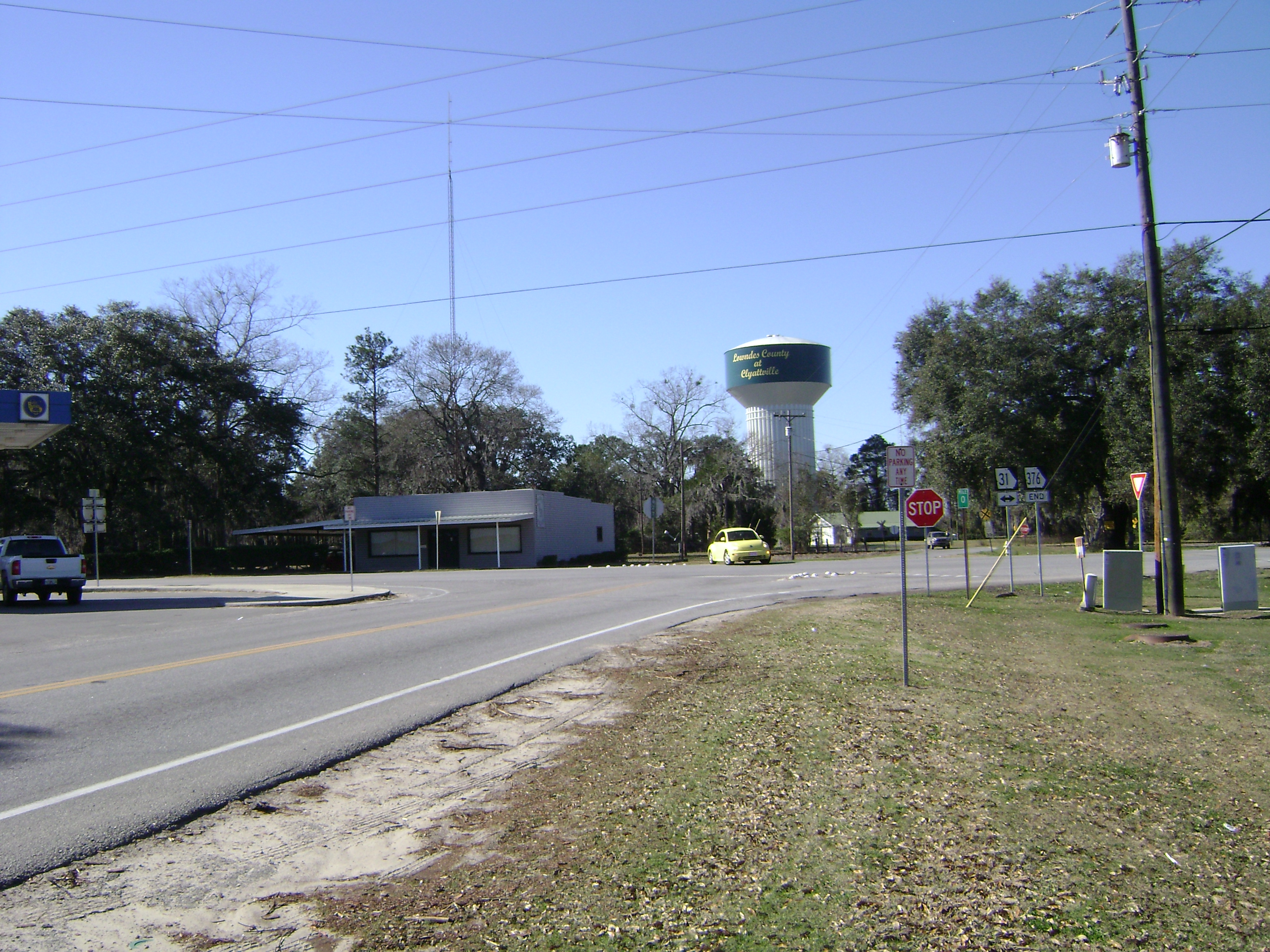
SR 376's western terminus in Clyattville

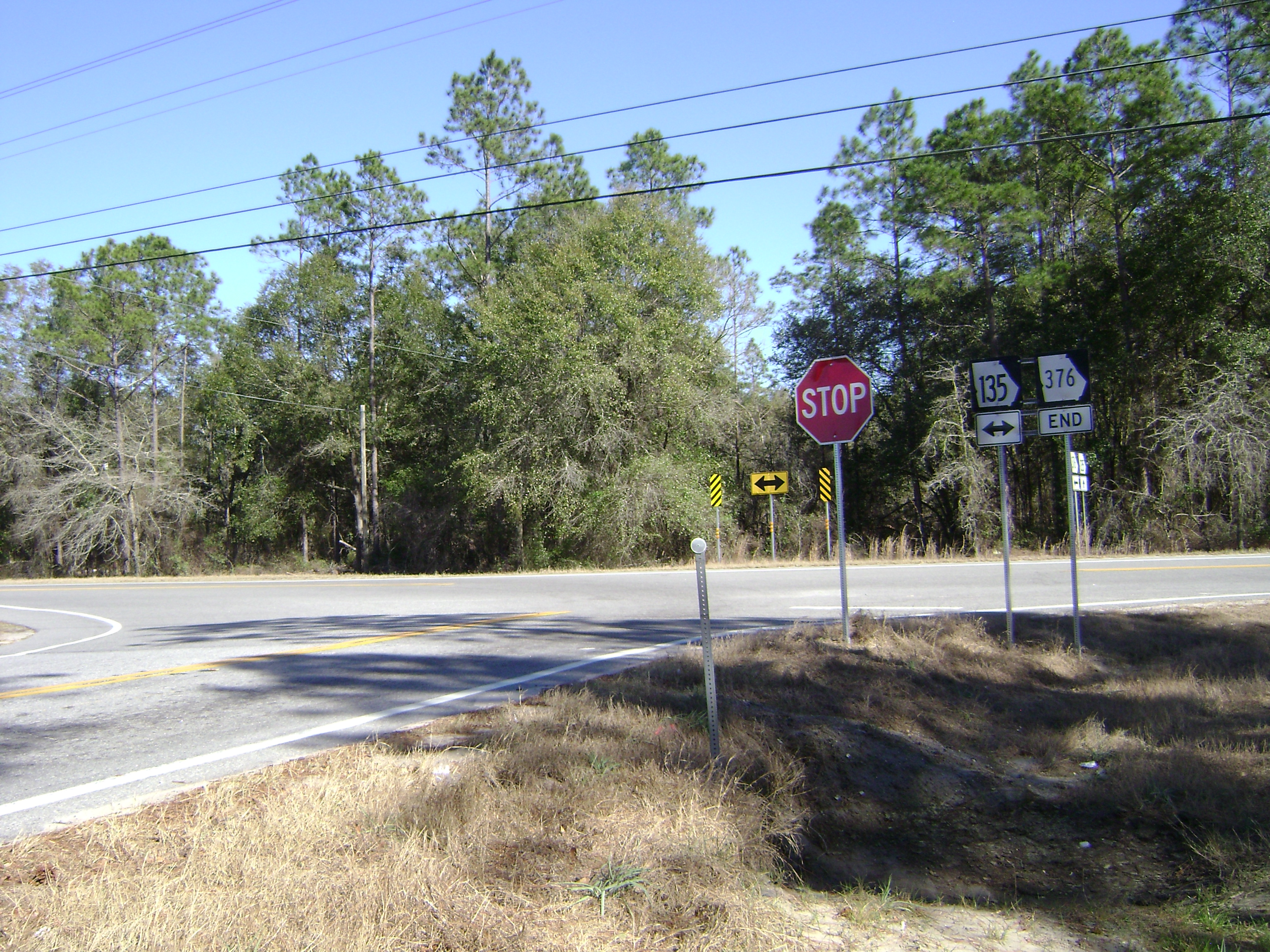
SR 376's eastern terminus west of Statenville

== History ==
The road that would eventually become SR 376 was built between 1957 and 1960 along the same alignment as it travels today. In 1972, the entire road was designated as SR 376.

== Major intersections ==
County	Location	mi	km	Destinations	Notes
Lowndes	Clyattville	0.0	0.0	SR 31 – Madison, Valdosta	Western terminus
Lowndes		5.6	9.0	I-75 (SR 401) – Lake City, Valdosta	I-75 exit 5
Lowndes	Lake Park	7.2	11.6	US 41 north / SR 7 north (West Marion Avenue) – Valdosta	Western end of US 41/SR 7 concurrency
Lowndes	Lake Park	8.4	13.5	US 41 south / SR 7 south (East Marion Avenue) – Jasper	Eastern end of US 41/SR 7 concurrency
Echols		12.3	19.8	Alapahoochee River	
Echols		16.0	25.7	SR 135 – Jennings, Lakeland	Eastern terminus
1.000 mi = 1.609 km; 1.000 km = 0.621 mi: Concurrency terminus
