= Doris M. Curtis Outstanding Woman in Science Award =

Prize given annually by the Geological Society of America

The Doris M. Curtis Outstanding Woman in Science Award, also known as the Subaru Outstanding Woman in Science Award, is a prize given annually by the Geological Society of America to "...women who have made a significant impact on the geosciences with their Ph.D. research." The award is named in memory of Doris Malkin Curtis, first female president of the GSA, and sponsored by Subaru.

Recipients of the award are listed below.

Year	Name	Ph.D. affiliation	Contribution	Reference
2018	Andrea Balbas	California Institute of Technology	Application of cosmogenic nuclides and argon geochronology to paleoclimate, paleomagnetism, and paleohydrology.	
2017	Sonia M. Tikoo	Rutgers University	Planetary geology - the understanding of the paleomagnetism of lunar rocks and impact craters.	
2016	Christine A. Regalla	Pennsylvania State University	Tectonic evolution of northern Japan.	
2015	Priya M. Ganguli	University of California, Santa Cruz	Processes that influence mercury dynamics in coastal ecosystems.	
2014	Ami L. Ricassi	Oak Ridge National Laboratory	Controls on streamwater dissolved and particulate mercury within three mid-Appalachian forested headwater catchments.	
2013	Whitney M. Behr	University of Texas at Austin	Measurement of flow stress in ductilely deformed rocks in the crust in south-eastern California and southern Spain.	
2012	Phoebe A. Cohen	Harvard University	Precambrian paleontology - eukaryotic fossil groups from the Neoproterozoic.	
2011	Naomi E. Levin	Johns Hopkins University	Understanding how landscapes and terrestrial organisms respond to past climate change.	
2010	Kateryna Klotchko	University of Maryland, College Park	Calibration and theoretical understanding of the boron isotope-pH proxy.	
2009	Jaime D. Barnes	University of New Mexico	Chlorine isotope geochemistry of a wide range of geological materials.	
2008	Lorraine E. Lisiecki	University of California, Santa Barbara	Computational approaches to the comparison and interpretation of paleoclimate records.	
2007	Tanja Bosak	California Institute of Technology	Laboratory models to examine microbial biosignatures in carbonate rocks	
2006	Elizabeth S. Cochran	University of California, Los Angeles	Tidal triggering of earthquakes and crustal active fault zone microcracks.	
2005	Michelle Walvoord	New Mexico Institute of Mining and Technology	Revision of the understanding of flow processes in desert regions where water tables are greater than 50 meters deep.	
2004	Costanza Bonadonna			
2003	Marin K. Clark			
2002	Miriam E. Katz		Micropaleontology	
2001	Ingrid Hendy	University of Michigan	Rapid Climate Change Recorded in the North Pacific: Triggers, Processes and Effects.	
2000	Emily E. Brodsky			
1999	Carrie E. Schweitzer			
