= Fruitland, Georgia =

- Unincorporated community
- Location within the state of Georgia Fruitland (the United States)
- Coordinates: 30°49′25″N 82°51′17″W
- Country: United States
- State: Georgia
- County: Echols
- Elevation: 161 ft (49 m)
- Time zone: UTC-5 (Eastern (EST))
  - Summer (DST): UTC-4 (EDT)
- ZIP codes: 31630
- GNIS feature ID: 326295

Fruitland is an unincorporated community in northeastern Echols County, Georgia, United States. It lies on State Route 187 to the northeast of the unincorporated community of Statenville, the county seat of Echols County. Its elevation is 161 feet (49 m).
