= John P. Platt =

Professor of geology

- Education: University of California Santa Barbara
- Scientific career
- Fields: structural geology, tectonics
- Workplaces: University of Southern California

John P. Platt is a professor and structural geologist at the University of Southern California. His research centers on deformation processes within Earth's crust and lithosphere, focusing on convergent plate margins and collisional orogens through the applications of geophysical methods and mechanical modeling.

== Academic career ==
Platt earned a BA in Geology from Oxford University followed by a PhD from the University of California, Santa Barbara. Platt's early academic career included lectureships at City University of Amsterdam and Oxford, where he was a tutorial fellow at St. Anne's College. Following that, Platt was the Yates-Goldsmid Professor, at the University College London, before moving to the University of Southern California. John P. Platt continues to collaborate with former students including Whitney Behr.

== Awards ==
- Fellow of the Geological Society of America
- 2023 Career Contribution Award from the Structural Geology & Tectonics division of the Geological Society of America
- 2018 Stephan Mueller Award from the European Geosciences Union

== Research ==
Platt uses a multidisciplinary approach, combining microstructural analysis, geochronology, thermal modeling, and rheology to study the mechanics of lithospheric deformation across various geological contexts, including orogenic wedges and metamorphic core complexes like those in the Western US Cordillera and the Betic Cordillera of Spain. His research highlights deformation processes at plate margins and the integration of field studies with mechanical and analytical modeling to describe large-scale tectonic dynamics, including the formation and exhumation of high-pressure rocks, the behavior of low-angle normal faults, and the role of extensional deformation in convergent margins.

== Notable publications ==
Dynamics of orogenic wedges and the uplift of high-pressure metamorphic rocks: Platt explored the deformation histories of convergent orogenic wedges experiencing prograde metamorphism. He found that an orogenic wedge undergoing subduction deforms internally until gravitational forces are in equilibrium with subduction traction. Accretion at the front of the wedge induces shortening via folding, late-thrusting, and back thrusting. High pressure metamorphic rocks are uplifted through normal faults due to deep underplating. Deformation histories of orogenic wedges are complex; variations in wedge rheology, subduction rate, sediment thickness, and accretion style lead to alternating periods of internal shortening and extension.

Exhumation of high-pressure rocks: a review of concepts and processes: This review discusses mechanisms of high-pressure metamorphic rock exhumation beyond thrusting or strike-slip faulting—buoyancy-driven rise of less dense rocks, extension due to surface elevation contrasts, and corner flow of low-viscosity material in subduction zones. The work concludes that a combination of mechanisms can describe the upward movement of deeply buried rocks and their emplacement in diverse tectonic settings.

A naturally constrained stress profile through the middle crust in an extensional terrane: Platt and co-authors construct a stress profile of the Whipple Mountains metamorphic core complex through exhumed middle-crustal rocks, applying methods of paleopiezometry, Ti-in-quartz thermobarometry, and 2-D thermal modeling. The publication provides insight into crustal strength, fault friction and regional stress conditions during Miocene extension.

Extensional collapse of thickened continental lithosphere: A working hypothesis for the Alboran and Gibraltar arc: The article explains a hypothesis on the extensional collapse of thickened continental lithosphere. It suggests that the lithosphere in the Alboran Sea and Gibraltar arc underwent significant thickening due to tectonic forces, followed by extensional collapse. This process may have been crucial to the formation of these geological features.

Extensional structures in anisotropic rocks: This article shows the development of extensional structures in anisotropic rocks. It explains the roles of mineral alignment and structural heterogeneities in controlling the formation of features like faults, fractures, and shear zones under extensional stress. The authors show how anisotropy affects the evolution of extensional structures.
