= Doris Malkin Curtis =

American paleontologist and geologist

Doris Malkin Curtis

Doris Malkin Curtis (January 12, 1914 – May 26, 1991) was an American paleontologist, stratigrapher, and geologist. She became the first woman president of the Geological Society of America (1991) and made meaningful contributions to the Scripps Institution of Oceanography.

== Biography ==
Doris Malkin Curtis was born in Brooklyn, New York, on January 12, 1914. Both her father, Meyer Malkin, who worked in dentistry, and her mother, Mary Berkowitz, who was her father's secretary and clinic assistant, inspired Doris from a young age to pursue excellence in all areas of life. In her early years, Curtis was involved with Girl Scouts, both as a member and leader. She attended Erasmus Hall High School in Brooklyn. Afterward, she attended Brooklyn College, where she received her bachelor's degree in Geology (1933). Shortly thereafter, she earned her master's degree (1934) and PhD (1949) at Columbia University researching micropaleontology. She married a Shell Oil Company engineer in 1950, the marriage ended in a divorce.

Curtis did not have biological children, but was involved and dedicated to her nieces and friends offspring. She was invested in their lives from their education, achievements, and general welfare; she impacted the people in her life leaving them with fond memories of her character, and not just her scientific achievements. In early March 1991, Curtis was invited to the Indiana University as a guest speaker for geology for Women's History Month when she experienced her first symptoms of being unwell. She was diagnosed with acute leukemia on March 12 of 1991. She was hospitalized on the fourth of April, where she continued to work until her death on May 26, 1991 (age 77). She died from pneumonia in Houston at the M.D Anderson Cancer Research Institute – the same place where her career began. In August later that year, her life was celebrated by the staff of the Geological Society of America as her ashes were placed beneath the branches of a spruce tree, which represented the ever-growing impact she made on those she encountered.

== Career ==
Curtis began her career working in the petroleum industry with small independent companies in 1939; she wanted to measure depths of the earth and study the characteristics of multiple subsurfaces. In 1941, Curtis began working for the Shell Oil Company. Initially, she worked as a paleontologist, until she was transferred to different locations to work as a stratigrapher and geologist (1942-1950). As a member of the Houston Geological Society, she participated in the construction of technical papers for the Gulf Coast Section. Marriage to a Shell engineer ended her employment at Shell, due to nepotism and gender discrimination; she then taught at University of Houston (1949-1951), then at Scripps Institution of Oceanography, (1951-1954), where she made contributions to the study of biofacies through her participation in the American Petroleum Institute Project 51. Curtis taught at University of Oklahoma from 1954-1959 and, in later years, at Rice University (1979-1991). In 1960, she began working in the petroleum field once more and was assigned to Shell's Baton Rouge Exploration Office and Curtis was promoted to the position of senior geologist. In 1975, Curtis was transferred to work in Houston, TX, where she was served as staff geologist of Shell's International Ventures Group. Curtis retired from Shell in 1979 at the age of 65. Then in 1979, Curtis, with her longtime friend and partner, Dorothy Jung Echols, formed a geology consulting firm, by the name of 'Curtis and Echols. Through this consulting firm, Curtis used her skills to map the deposition of hydrocarbons in various locations. She investigated petroleum rich areas and published in 1970, SEPM (Society for Sedimentary Geology) Special Publication No. 15 "Sandstone deltas in petroleum rich Miocene of coastal Louisiana". Curtis gave presentations at various universities on geological topics. During her time as a geologist, she has produced and contributed to over 30 papers on numerous topics in the geological field.

In 1990, she was elected the first woman president of The Geological Society of America, which consisted of roughly 17,000 members. Even during her battle with acute leukemia, she continued to travel as the GSA president, demonstrating the same strength and perseverance that for which she was known. Curtis was an explorer in her field, working on the Gulf Coast for over 50 years. Her contributions to the geological field facilitated the development of new concepts for interpreting the geology of basins world-wide and the study of time-synchronous deltas, initiated in Louisiana, and published in the SEPM.

=== Advocacy ===
Curtis was adamant on social justice issues; she was a member of the League of Women Voters and earned her the position of president. Curtis was also a member and leader of the Environmental Quality Committee of Shell Oil where she addressed how the company could limit their pollution and impact on the environment.

Curtis received the Matrix award in Houston for Women in Community Service.

With her background in geology and industry, she became a member of the Environmental Quality Committee and worked towards the conservation of the environments that industries are founded on and led her to be appointed in 1967 as one of four delegates from the United States to the USSR in an exchange visit to tour petroleum provinces in the Baku area of the Caspian Sea. (need citation)

== Accomplishments ==
Curtis was a member of multiple geologic organizations including president of the Gulf section of SEPM, the Association of Geologists for International Development (AGID), the International Association of Sedimentologists, the American Institute of Professional Geologists (AIPG) - where she served on the executive committee, the American Association for the Advancement of Science (AAAS), the American Association of Petroleum Geologists (AAPG) where she was chair of Section E (1979-1980), the Houston Geological Society, Sigma Xi, a member of the board for the Treatise on Petroleum Geology, the 28th International Geological Congress, and the Scientific Committee of the International Geological Correlation Programme of the International Union of Geological Sciences. Curtis was the first woman to become president of the Geological Society of America (GSA) 1989-1991. Curtis was the first woman to contribute to "Distinguished Lecturer for the American Association of Petroleum Geologists," in which she went on to become one of the two women who were "honorary members." Curtis served as the president of the Society of Economic Paleontologists and Mineralogists.

Curtis published over 30 papers that were featured in professional journals on topics such as biostratigraphy and the source of hydrocarbons in the Gulf of Mexico during the Cenozoic period. She coauthored the book "How to Try to Find an Oil Field", published in 1981, with Patricia Wood Dickerson, and Donald M Gray.

As reported in her obituary, the accomplishment she was most proud of was her opportunity to participate in the shipboard sedimentologist on two legs of the Deep Sea Drilling Project on the Glomar Challenger in Yokohama to Okinawa Japan from 1978 to 1979 and again in 1983. Doris felt that the experience was comparable to a "trip to the moon."

== Honors ==
The Doris Malkin Curtis medal, established in 2007, is awarded to individuals in geology who have made considerable contributions in understanding of the geology of the Gulf Coast and Gulf of Mexico, specifically on the topic of basins. The Medal was established to honor Curtis' contributions and accomplishments in the field of geology across 50 years. Curtis was named distinguished professional by the Houston Federation of Professional Women and was listed in the book American Men and Women of Science and Marquis Who's Who due to her contributions to geology.

The Curtis-Hedberg Petroleum Career Achievement Award is an award that is meant to honor the two former presidents of GSA (Geological Society of America), Doris Malkin Curtis and Hollis Hedberg. This award is given to those who have made significant contributions to the discovery of petroleum reserves.

The Doris M. Curtis Outstanding Women in Science Award, is awarded to women who have made great impacts on geoscience through their PhD research.

== See also ==
- Timeline of women in science
