= Howell, Georgia =

Unincorporated community in Georgia, U.S.

Coordinates: 30°49′40″N 83°03′14″W

Howell is an unincorporated community and former town in Echols County, in the U.S. state of Georgia.

== History ==
Historical population
Census	Pop.	Note	%±
1910	194		—
1920	198		2.1%
1930	171		−13.6%
1940	174		1.8%
1950	169		−2.9%
1960	141		−16.6%
1970	99		−29.8%
U.S. Decennial Census; 1850-1870 1870-1880; 1890-1910 1920-1930; 1940 1950 1960; 1970 1980 1990; 2000

A post office called Howell was established in 1899, and remained in operation until 1957.

The Georgia General Assembly incorporated the place in 1905 as the Town of Howell. The town's municipal charter was dissolved in 1995.

It first appeared as a town in the 1910 United States census with a population of 194. It last appeared in the 1970 United States census. It was consolidated into the Echols County government in 2008.
