= Costanza Bonadonna =

Italian earth scientist

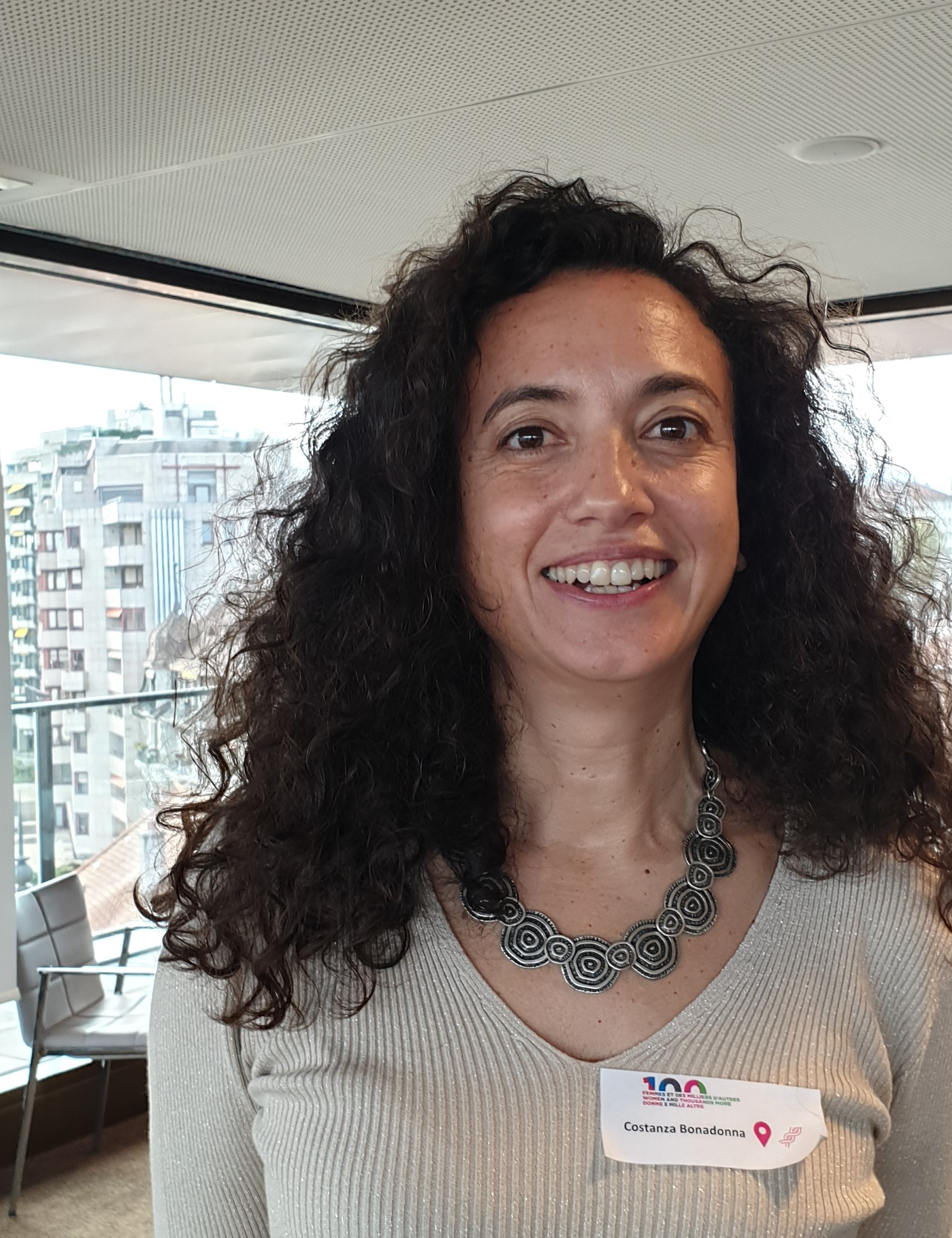
- Costanza Bonadonna in 2019
- Born: 1971 (age 54–55)
- Education: University of Bristol (PhD); University of Pisa
- Known for: Volcanology
- Awards: Woman Scientist of the Month
- Scientific career
- Fields: Physical Volcanology; Volcanic ash Hazard assessment Geological risk
- Workplaces: University of Geneva; University of Hawaiʻi; University of South Florida; Montserrat Volcano Observatory
- Thesis: Models of tephra dispersal (2001)
- Website: www.unige.ch/sciences/terre/CERG-C/about/people/bonadonna/

Costanza Bonadonna (born 1971) is an Italian earth scientist who is a Full Professor of volcanology and geological risk at the University of Geneva. She currently serves as Dean of the Faculty of Science at the University of Geneva, President of the International Association of Volcanology and Chemistry of the Earth's Interior (IAVCEI), and past President of the Volcanology, Geochemistry, and Petrology (VGP) section of the American Geophysical Union (AGU).

== Early life and education ==
Costanza Bonadonna became interested in science and nature as a child. In fact, she was raised in Pisa (Italy) and she became aware at an early age about the impact of natural risks. When she was at high school Prof. Franco Barberi came to deliver a lecture in which he discussed the science of risk reduction during volcanic eruptions. She realised that whilst volcanic eruptions can be devastating for communities, they can bring benefits, including fertilisation of soils. She appreciated, therefore, the importance of developing strategies for sustainable development of communities exposed to natural risks. She earned her laurea in geology at the University of Pisa. She moved to the University of Bristol for her PhD, where her research investigated models for the dispersal of tephra.

== Research and career ==
Bonadonna's research investigates physical volcanology, volcanic ash, hazard assessment and geological risk After completing her PhD, Bonadonna was appointed as a school of ocean and earth science and technology (SOEST) young investigator at the University of Hawaiʻi. Bonadonna develops computational models to describe sedimentation from volcanic plumes. Soon after she moved to the University of South Florida. Since 2007, she has served as Director of the Assessment and management of Geological and Climate-Related Risks (CERG-C) programme at the University of Geneva. In 2018, she was appointed Vice Dean of the Faculty of Science.

Bonadonna's research focuses on the modeling of particle sedimentation from volcanic plumes (so-called tephra or pyroclastic sediments), the development of new methodologies for the characterisation of tephra-fallout deposits as well as the development of probabilistic strategies to assess the hazard of tephra-fallout deposits. She is also active in the linkage between model development and risk assessment and mitigation in the effort of bridging the gap between scientists and non-scientists (e.g. emergency management planners, government officials). She has been involved in many international projects for the assessment and quantification of volcanic hazard and risk. She was named President-Elect of Volcanology, Geochemistry, and Petrology section at the American Geophysical Union in 2020. In 2023, she began a 4 year term as President of the International Association of Volcanology and Chemistry of the Earth's Interior.

== Awards and honours ==
- 2001 Geological Society of London president's award
- 2004 International Association of Volcanology and Chemistry of the Earth's Interior (IAVCEI) outstanding recent graduate
- 2004 Geological Society of America Doris M. Curtis Outstanding Woman in Science Award
- 2005 University of South Florida outstanding faculty research achievement award
- 2020 European Platform of Women Scientists woman scientist of the month
- 2020 Italian Rotary Clubs for Sciences International Galileo Galilei Award
- 2021 elected to Academia Europaea

== Selected publications ==
- Bonadonna, C.; Houghton, B. F. (1 June 2005). "Total grain-size distribution and volume of tephra-fall deposits". Bulletin of Volcanology. 67 (5): 441–456. Bibcode:2005BVol...67..441B. doi:10.1007/s00445-004-0386-2. ISSN 1432-0819. S2CID 53386767.
- Bonadonna, C.; Ernst, G. G. J.; Sparks, R. S. J. (1 May 1998). "Thickness variations and volume estimates of tephra fall deposits: the importance of particle Reynolds number". Journal of Volcanology and Geothermal Research. 81 (3): 173–187. Bibcode:1998JVGR...81..173B. doi:10.1016/S0377-0273(98)00007-9. ISSN 0377-0273.
- Bonadonna, C.; Connor, C. B.; Houghton, B. F.; Connor, L.; Byrne, M.; Laing, A.; Hincks, T. K. (2005). "Probabilistic modeling of tephra dispersal: Hazard assessment of a multiphase rhyolitic eruption at Tarawera, New Zealand". Journal of Geophysical Research: Solid Earth. 110 (B3): B03203. Bibcode:2005JGRB..110.3203B. doi:10.1029/2003JB002896. ISSN 2156-2202.
