= John Echols (disambiguation) =

John, Johnny or Jon Echols can refer to:

- John Echols (1823–1896), American Civil War general
- Johnny Echols (born 1947), American singer/songwriter and guitarist
- Johnny Echols (baseball) (1917–1972), American major league player
- Jon Echols (born 1979), American politician
