= Tanja Bosak =

Croatian experimental geobiologist

Tanja Bosak is a Croatian-American experimental geobiologist who is currently an associate professor in the Earth, Atmosphere, and Planetary Science department at the Massachusetts Institute of Technology. Her awards include the Subaru Outstanding Woman in Science Award from the Geological Society of America (2007), the James B. Macelwane Medal from the American Geophysical Union (2011), and was elected an AGU fellow (2011). Bosak is recognized for her work understanding stromatolite genesis, in addition to her work in broader geobiology and geochemistry.

== Education ==
Tanja Bosak completed her B.Sc. in geophysics from the University of Zagreb, and her PhD in geobiology at the California Institute of Technology, where she worked with Dianne Newman. Before her PhD, she completed a summer of research at the NASA Jet Propulsion Laboratory. She initially started her PhD with the intent of being focusing on planetary sciences. During this time, she published with Andrew Ingersoll on Jupiter's atmosphere. She later focused on stromatolite genesis with Dianne Newman, and in 2005 completed her PhD dissertation, entitled "Laboratory models of microbial biosignatures in carbonate rocks". She undertook postdoctoral work as a Microbial Sciences Initiative Fellow, Harvard University, working with Ann Pearson and Richard Losick.

== Work ==
Bosak's research has mainly been in the field of geobiology, notably in studying stromatolites, organic geochemistry, and sedimentology. Her early work with Dianne Newman at Caltech studied the formation of stromatolites and their interpretation in the rock record. In this work, she used the sulfate reducing bacterium Desulfovibrio desulfuricans strain G20 to investigate microbial precipitation of carbonates. She found that contrary to contemporary models, biotic sulfate reduction was not the cause of carbonate precipitation in pre-Cambrian ocean conditions. Her research suggested distinct carbonate microstructures as indicators of stromatolite biogenicity and that microbial processes influence the shape of calcite crystals precipitated under supersaturated conditions. In 2007, it was shown by her work that the anoxygenic photosynthetic bacterium Rhodopseudomonas palustris could cause stromatolite formation. This is in contrast to modern day biogenic stromatolites, which usually form through the action of Cyanobacteria. These results were interpreted as a potential mechanism for Archaean stromatolite formation, which pre-date the rise of oxygenic photosynthesis. While working with Dianne Newman, Bosak also demonstrated that calcite peloids can be abiotically formed while still resembling biogenic peloids, cautioning against assuming that all peloidal calcite structures in the rock record are biogenic.

Bosak's postdoctoral research with Richard Losick and Ann Pearson used organic geochemistry and genetics to understand microbial evolution and ancient Earth history. Through characterizing tetracyclic isoprenoids (sporulenes) in spores of the bacterium Bacillus subtilis, Bosak determined that these sporulenes were involved in protection against oxidative stress. Derivative compounds of sporulenes are found in the rock record, and Bosak proposed that these molecules could be used as biomarkers of aerobic environments.

As a professor at MIT, Bosak's research has pursued multiple paths, including stromatolite biogenesis, microbial mats, sedimentology, and microbial stable isotope fractionation. With Alexander P. Petroff and others, Bosak's research demonstrated photosynthetic origins and features of stromatolites. Her group's findings also showed how wrinkle structure morphologies form in stromatolites, how stromatolite structures could be misinterpreted in the fossil record as signs of animal locomotion and how elongated microbial mat morphologies could be formed.

With Min Sub Sim and Shuhei Ono, Bosak found that biological sulfate reduction can produce large stable isotope fractionations of sulfur, similar to those seen in the rock record of early Earth. The authors interpreted this as evidence that large sulfur isotope fractionations are not unequivocally indicative of sulfur metabolisms other than sulfate reduction on early Earth. Further studies suggested that microbial sulfate reduction and heterotrophy together, or that iron and nitrogen limitation could similarly lead to large sulfate isotopic fractionations. Bosak also characterized microfossils in post-Sturtian and Cryogenian carbonates from Namibia and Mongolia.

== Awards and honors ==
- Subaru Outstanding Woman in Science Award from the Geological Society of America (2007)
- James B. Macelwane Medal from the American Geophysical Union (2011)
- AGU Fellow (2011)
- MIT Harold E. Edgerton Faculty Achievement Award (2011-2012)
- MIT UROP Outstanding Mentor - Faculty (2011-2012)
- Simons Collaboration on the Origins of Life Investigator (2014)
- Simons Early Career Investigator in Marine Microbial Ecology and Evolution Awards (2015): Project title "Record of Microbial and Geochemical Co-evolution in Cyanobacterial Genomes"
- GSA Geobiology and Geomicrobiology Division Award for Outstanding Research - Post-Tenure Award Recipient (2016)
