= Corbett Farm =

Historic house in Georgia, United States

- U.S. National Register of Historic Places
- U.S. Historic district
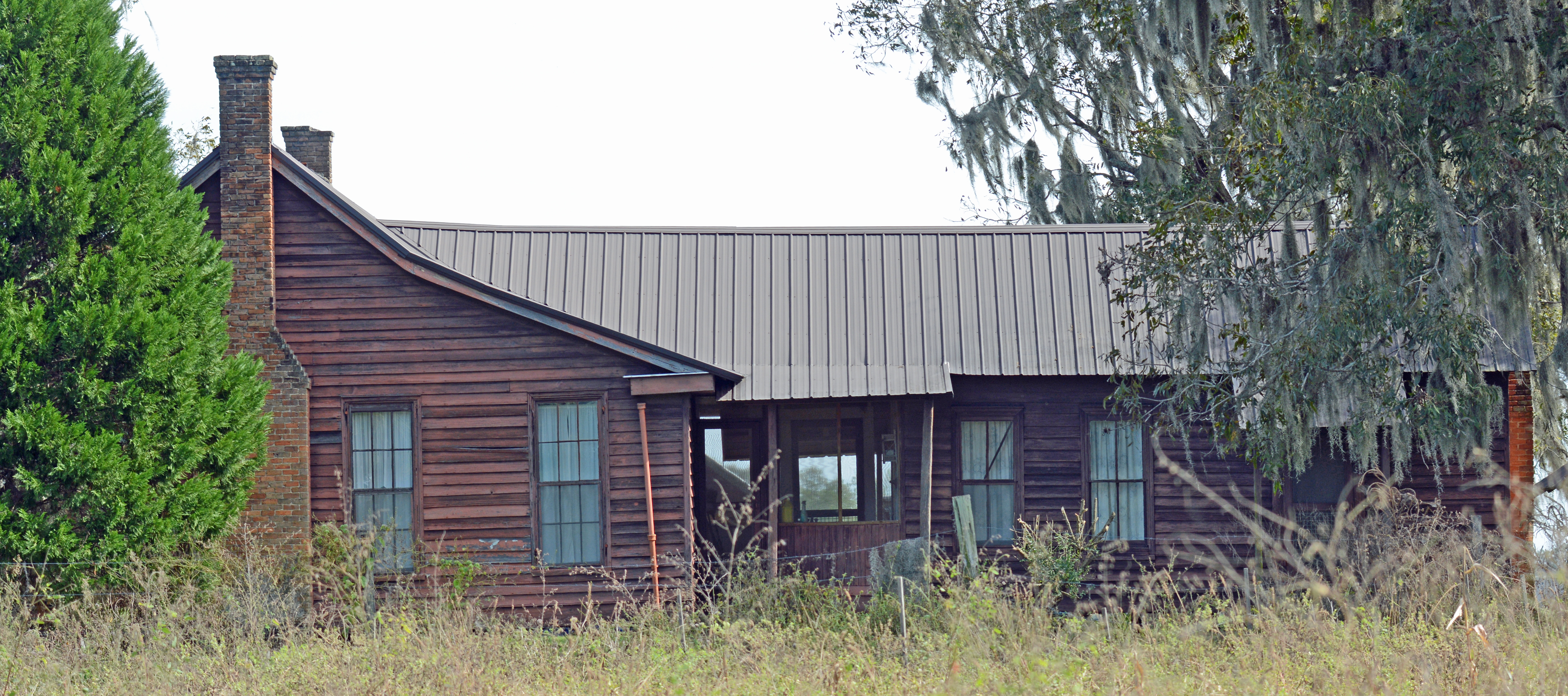

- Location within Georgia Location within the United States
- Location: Rte 2, Lake Park, Georgia
- Coordinates: 30.69328°N 83.10814°W
- Built: 1878
- Built by: McLane, James
- Architectural style: Hall-Parlor House
- NRHP reference No.: 00001455
- Added to NRHP: December 1, 2000

The Corbett Farm near Echols in rural Echols County, Georgia was listed on the National Register of Historic Places in 2000.

The property includes a farmhouse built ca. 1878-79 plus outbuildings. The farmhouse is a hall-parlor plan with a rear ell. It is built with a wood frame joined by mortise-and-tenon joints and it incorporates wooden pegs and square nails. It has original clapboard siding.

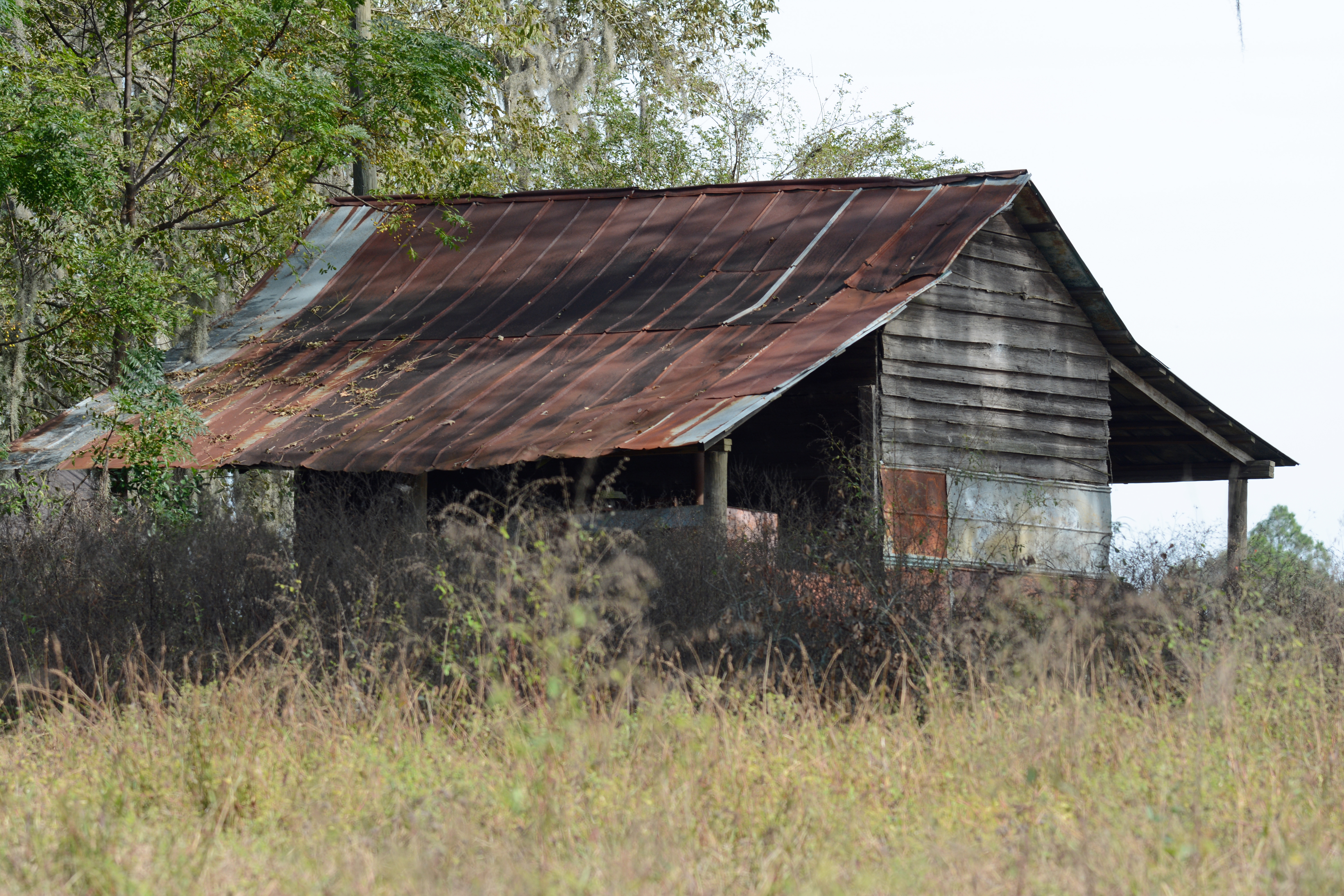

The listing included five contributing buildings and one other contributing structure, plus a non-contributing garage.

Under ownership of Bryant W. Corbett (d.1917), who built the farm, the farm primarily grew peanuts and corn. The corn was harvested but the peanuts were left in the field to feed hogs that would root them up.

The farm was named a Georgia Centennial Family Farm in 1996 as it had been continuously operated as a farm by one family for over 100 years.
