= Alapahoochee River =

River in Florida, United States

Location
- Country: United States

Physical characteristics
- Source
  - location: Georgia
- Length: 14.4 mi (23.2 km)

The Alapahoochee River is a 14.4-mile-long (23.2 km) tributary of the Alapaha River in Georgia and Florida in the United States. Via the Alapaha and Suwannee rivers, its waters flow to the Gulf of Mexico.

The river rises on the boundary between Lowndes and Echols counties at the confluence of Grand Bay Creek and Mud Creek, about 10 miles (16 km) southeast of Valdosta. The river flows southeast through Echols County, crossing into Hamilton County, Florida, around 2 miles (3 km) above its confluence with the Alapaha River near the town of Jennings.

Other names: Little River, Little Alapaha and Grand Bay Creek.

== Crossings ==
Crossing	Carries	Image	Location	ID number	Coordinates
=== Georgia ===
	SR 376				30.7038°N 83.1213°W
	J. Frank Culpepper Road				30.6734°N 83.1047°W
	SR 135				30.6287°N 83.0879°W
=== Florida ===
	NW 9th Drive/Swilley Road				30.6163°N 83.0797°W

== See also ==
- List of rivers of Florida
- List of rivers of Georgia
