= Whitney Maria Behr =

Geologist

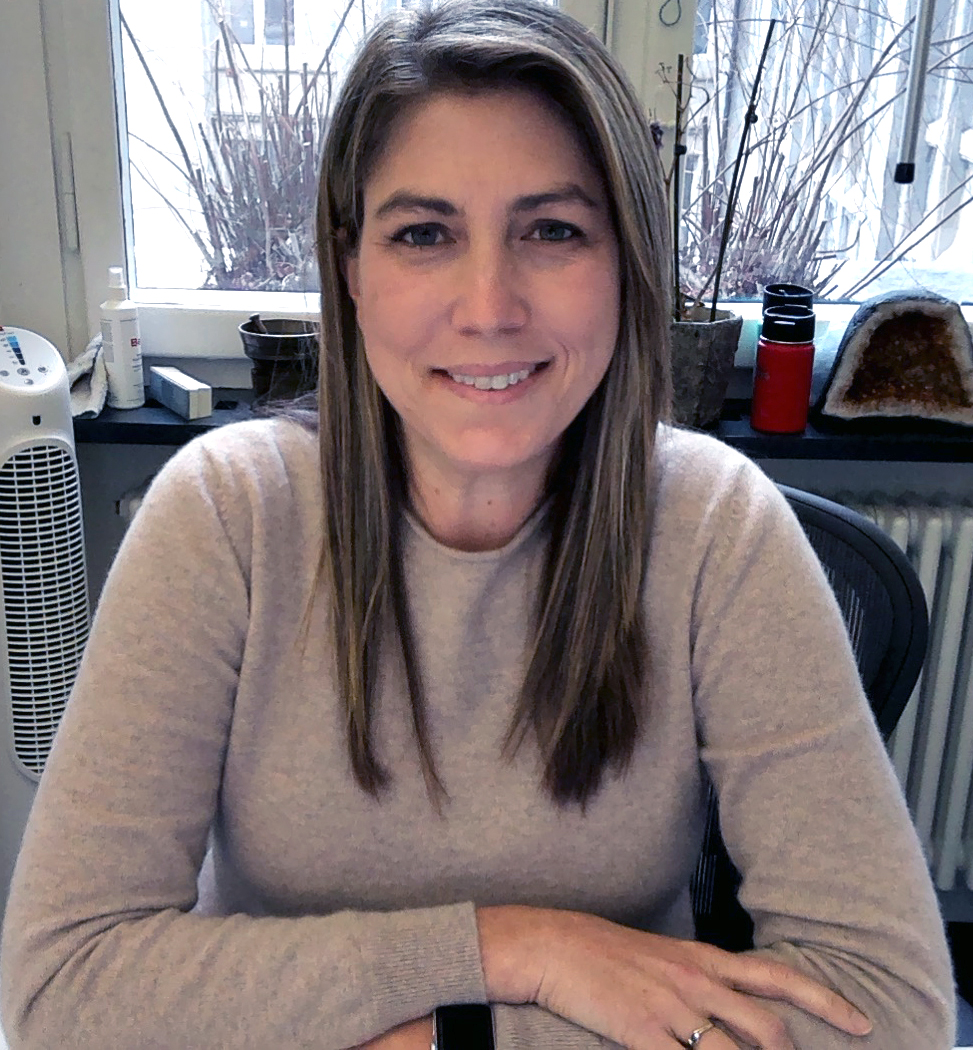
- Whitney Behr
- Born: September 25, 1981 (age 44); Los Angeles, California, U.S.
- Education: California State University, Northridge (BS); University of Southern California (PhD)
- Known for: Research on deformation mechanics and kinematics of the Earth's lithosphere; intracontinental subduction; seismic hazard analysis
- Awards: Presidential Early Career Award for Scientists and Engineers (2019); Geological Society of America Donath Medal (2016); Doris M. Curtis Outstanding Woman in Science Award (2013)
- Scientific career
- Fields: Structural geology; tectonics; rheology; rock mechanics
- Institutions: ETH Zurich; University of Texas at Austin; Brown University
- Doctoral advisor: John P. Platt

Whitney Maria Behr (born September 25, 1981) is an American earth scientist known for her contributions to understanding mechanics and kinematics of deformation in Earth's lithosphere. She was educated in the United States following which she held academic positions there. Since 2018, she has been the chair of the Structural Geology & Tectonics Group in the Geological Institute at ETH Zürich.

== Early life, education and family ==
Behr was born on September 25, 1981, in Los Angeles, California, United States. Behr completed her B.S in geology in May 2006 at California State University, Northridge. She went on to do her doctoral studies in structural geology and active tectonics at University of Southern California under the supervision of John P. Platt.

She holds professional affiliations with the Geological Society of America, American Geophysical Union (AGU), the Earth Science Women's Network (ESWN) and Sigma Xi.

She is married, currently resides in Zurich and has a son, aged 5.

== Academic career ==
She completed her doctoral studies in structural geology and active tectonics at University of Southern California under the supervision of John P. Platt. After receiving her PhD in 2011, she worked as a Post-Doctoral Research Fellow at the Department of Geological Sciences at Brown University under the supervision of Greg Hirth till June 2012. From August 2012 to June 2018, Whitney held the post of assistant professor at the Jackson School of Geosciences, University of Texas at Austin. Since July 2018, she holds the chair of the Structural Geology and Tectonics group at the Department of Earth Science in ETH Zurich.

Her primary research interests are the mechanics and kinematics of deformation in the Earth's lithosphere, rheology of the crust and upper mantle, strain localisation, rock mechanics, tectonic geomorphology, Quaternary geochronology, quantifying slip rates and earthquake hazards. Her research methodology combines field, analytical and experimental techniques to improve understanding of deformation at active and ancient plate margins. She has made contributions toward understanding the link between deformation of slow ductile flow and rapid seismogenic movements of brittle lithosphere. This helped improve understanding of seismic hazard potential. She investigated the differences between slip rates measured geodetic methods and geological slip rates. The work contributed toward understanding of intracontinental subduction zones.

She has extensive field experience spanning California (Mojave desert, Coachella Valley, Klamath Mountains); Betic Cordillera in southern Spain; Syros Island in Greece; Rio Grande in New Mexico; Kenai Peninsula in Alaska; Northeastern China; Morocco in Northern Africa.

== Awards and recognition ==
In 2019, she received the Presidential Early Career Award for Scientists and Engineers. In 2016, she received the Young Scientist Award (Donath Medal) awarded by the Geological Society of America. In 2013, Whitney Behr received Doris M. Curtis Outstanding Woman in Science Award for her significant contribution toward Geosciences in her PhD.

== Notable publications ==
Behr has investigated a wide range of fields in structural geology, including the rheology of the upper crust and mantle. In a 2022 study, she substantiated the importance of plate interfaces in subduction dynamics, suggesting that the shear zone rheology of subduction interfaces is sensitive to the composition of subducting crustal material. Through the use of 2D numerical models of subducting plates Behr and co-author proposed that the viscosity and topography of the plate interface can influence the convergence speeds of the plates both prior to and after slab interaction. She also proposed that a stronger plate interface leads to steeper slab dips, more vertical sinking, and compressional deviatoric stresses in the overriding plate, while a weaker interface leads to neutral extensional stresses in the forearc.

Behr's work has also been influential in earthquake hazard assessment . Through several studies of the Agua Blanca Fault (ABF) in Northern Baja California, she and co-authors mapped how strain is transferred along the southernmost part of the San Andreas fault system by studying Late Quaternary slip histories. Using GPS and LiDAR, 10Be exposure, and optically stimulated luminescence geochronology techniques, she observed that the ABF has an along-strike slip rate of ~3mm per year, which has remained relatively constant over time. The ABF accommodates at least half of the total slip across the Peninsular Ranges of the San Andreas fault system. These studies have been influential for seismic hazard assessments which have previously lacked long-term slip rates along this portion of the San Andreas fault system.

Behr has pioneered a new method for evaluating lithospheric strength profiles in the middle crust. By identifying preserved microstructures in exhumed mid-crustal rocks in the Whipple Mountains of California as points in a temperature-depth-stress space, Behr completed a profile of the crust's stress to a depth of 20 km. Through this research, Behr and co-author estimated the ambient stresses in the middle crust in this region and confirmed that stress in the middle crust is consistent with Byerlee's law during extension.

Some of Behr's research investigates the strength of the crust with depth. By compiling shear stress magnitudes at major fault zones from across the globe, Behr and co-authors suggest that there is an abrupt downward temperature-controlled cutoff of the weakening processes that control fault behavior in the upper crust. Continental crust is stressed close to failure down to the brittle-ductile transition zone, after which the crust becomes load-bearing.
