= Betty Kellett Nadeau =

American paleontologist

- Born: April 23, 1905; Kansas, U.S.
- Died: June 21, 1999 (aged 94)
- Occupation: Paleontologist

Betty Kellett Nadeau (April 23, 1905 – June 21, 1999), born Elizabeth Rosina Kellett, was an American paleontologist and micro-paleontologist who studied Palaeozoic ostracod. The genus Bekena named after her, as are several species.

== Early life ==
Elizabeth Rosina Kellett was born in 1905 in Kansas to Elsie Jane and Edward Vernon Kellett. For part of her childhood, she lived in Miami, Oklahoma.

Kellett moved to Lawrence, Kansas and attended the University of Kansas, where she studied with state geologist Raymond Cecil Moore and graduated in 1927. She pursued further studies in Massachusetts, working in the laboratory of paleontologist Joseph Augustine Cushman.

== Career ==
She worked for the Amerada Petroleum Corporation of Tulsa, Oklahoma beginning in 1929, before moving to Lake Charles, Louisiana, where she worked for Stone & Webster. In 1934, in Lake Charles, she married Edward Hollis Nadeau. Beginning in 1947, Nadeau taught at Washington University in St. Louis. , where she worked with Dorothy Jung Echols and became lifelong companions and continued to work together on many research projects. By 1958, she had left St. Louis to follow her husband E. H. Nadeau to Naples, Italy and to Venezuela, where he was stationed.

== Work ==
Some of the types of ostracods she worked with were primary types, as well as topotypes. These were collected from above and below the surface of the ground. Nadeau observed that there existed a multiplicity of variations not only between species of ostracods, but among each species as well. This research was based on the Kansas ostracods. She discovered that the variations within the Kansas ostracods was mainly caused by variations or mutations within individuals. She also found that sex and age of ostracods to be contributors to the variation. She spent eight years studying carboniferous ostracods and studying the different types of variations among this species.

Kellett created a large geological map, 20 feet long and six feet high, on a wall at the Wichita State University.

== Legacy ==
The species Paraparchites kellettae, Hollinella kellettae, Remaneica kellettae, Pseudobythocypris kellettae, and Polytylites kellettae and the genus Bekena are named for her.
