= Paul C. Echols =

American Musicologist

Paul C. Echols (1944 — September 25, 1994) was an American musicologist, music editor and publishing executive, music educator, and conductor.

== Life and career ==
Born in California, Echols grew up in Havana, Cuba. There he attended a school associated with an Anglican cathedral and was active in the school's chorus through which he developed an appreciation for early music composers like Thomas Tallis and William Byrd. He earned a Bachelor of Arts in Music from Duke University and a Master of Music from New York University.

A recognized expert in medieval music, Echols taught courses in early music at the Mannes School of Music where he also founded and directed the Mannes Camerata, an early music ensemble. He was also head of the opera program at that institution with which he was responsible for staging or conducting 12 operas from the Baroque period and six works from the Renaissance period; several of them United States premieres. Some of these works included the first modern revival of Adam de la Halle's 13th century medieval drama Robin and Marion,; the United States premieres of Francesco Cavalli's Giasone, Loreto Vittori's La Galatea, and Jacques Offenbach's Les bavards; and the New York premiere of John Blow's Venus and Adonis. Not limited to early music, he directed several contemporary American operas at Mannes as well.

As a writer Echols contributed several articles to The New Grove Dictionary of Music and Musicians. He was the editor of the Journal of Early Music America, the executive editor of the Charles Ives Society, and worked for Peermusic as their editor for contemporary music. He also served as the director of publications and a vice president of G. Schirmer, Inc. Also active as an arranger, his choral arrangement of Charles Ives's A Christmas Carol was recorded by Chanticleer on their 1995 album Sing We Christmas.

Echols died from a brain tumor on September 25, 1994 at the age of 50.

== Opera contributions ==
Echols created several pastiche for the opera stage based around both popular and court music and poetry and drama of the medieval period. The first of these was The City of Ladies which was constructed around an allegory by the 15th century Italian poet Christine de Pizan. This work utilized music composed by Guillaume Du Fay and Gilles Binchois and combined with Pizan's allegory, was staged in a style reminiscent of a mystery play with conventions of opera mixed in. This work was staged by the Mannes College of Music and performed by the Mannes Camerata in 1986. Reviewing this production, The New York Times music critic Tim Page wrote in his review,

"It is indicative of just how far we've come that a group of talented music students can now offer a livelier, more elegant, professional and stylistically authentic evening of early music than could have been expected from the most erudite performers and scholars of a generation ago. Truly ours is a golden age of musical discovery."

Another pastiche developed by Echols was Romance of the Rose which he described as "a 15th-century music drama". The work was intended to simulate a 15th-century Burgundian court masque. Splicing together music compositions from the 14th and 15th centuries by multiple composers containing a 'rose theme', the work was constructed to form a narrative based on the medieval Old French epic poem Roman de la Rose. Several new poems were written to serve as text to early music written by composers like Binchois, Antoine Busnois, John Dowland, Du Fay, and Hayne van Ghizeghem among others. This opera premiered at the Mannes College of Music in 1988 and was subsequently revived in New York following Echols death in 1994.
