= Oliver P. Echols =

United States Army Air Forces general (1892–1954)

Oliver Patton Echols
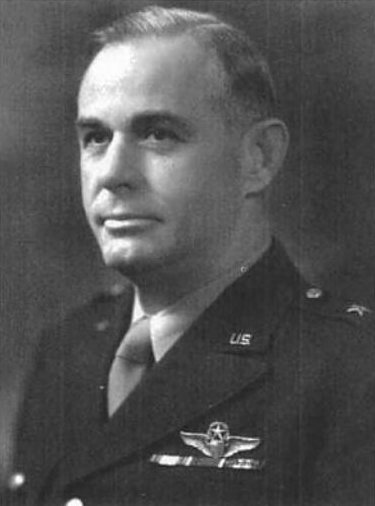
- Major General Oliver P. Echols
- Born: March 4, 1892; Charlottesville, Virginia
- Died: May 15, 1954 (aged 62); Los Angeles, California
- Burial place: 1954–1990: Arlington National Cemetery; From 1990: Rockport Cemetery in Aransas County, Texas
- Military career
- Allegiance: United States
- Branch: United States Army Air Service; U.S. Army Air Corps; U.S. Army Air Forces
- Service years: 1916–1946
- Rank: Major general
- Conflicts: World War I: Champagne-Marne; Aisne-Marne; Battle of Saint-Mihiel; Meuse-Argonne Offensive; World War II
- Awards: Distinguished Service Medal (2); Legion of Merit; Purple Heart
- Other work: Chairman and President of Northrop

Oliver Patton Echols (March 4, 1892 – May 15, 1954) was an American military officer who brought success in World War II to the United States Army Air Forces by expanding the inventory of America's air arm to meet the needs of the coming war. More than any other man under Chief of the Army Air Forces, General Henry H. Arnold, Echols was responsible for the development, procurement and supply of aircraft and aeronautical equipment. Fighter projects officer Benjamin S. Kelsey, directly subordinate to Echols from 1934 to 1945, called him "The Man Who Won World War II."

== Early career ==
Oliver Patton Echols was born on March 4, 1892, in Charlottesville, Virginia, to William Holding Echols, a university professor. Oliver Echols attended Virginia Polytechnic Institute and the University of Virginia, studying aviation engineering.

Echols enlisted in 1916 and served in World War I with the United States Army Air Service, American Expeditionary Force, from August 1917 to April 1919, participating as an aviator in the battles of Champagne-Marne, Aisne-Marne, St. Mihiel and Meuse-Argonne. At the rank of captain, Echols served as Chief of Air Service, I Corps, for the final drive against German forces.

Echols's educational and military preparation for his later specialization included attendance at the Army Industrial College, Command and General Staff School, Army War College, and Air Corps Tactical School. He served in the Air Corps Experimental Engineering Section and the Procurement Section before becoming the chief engineer of the Materiel Division from 1934 to 1938.

== War production ==
In January 1936, Echols telephoned Howard Hughes to say the Air Corps was interested in purchasing the record-breaking Hughes H-1 Racer as a pursuit plane—it was faster than anything they had. Hughes agreed to fly the aircraft to Wright Field for a demonstration, but he failed to show up for the appointment that Echols had set up with higher Air Corps brass. After that snub, Echols never again gave Hughes a chance to bid on Air Corps projects, not even in October 1941 when Hughes offered the twin-boom D-2 fighter-bomber design. Echols allowed Wright Field engineers to examine the D-2 but they concluded that it would be too heavy for its own engines after incorporating required military features such as armor plate, a bullet-resistant windshield and stronger landing gear.

Echols was assistant chief of the Materiel Division at Wright Field near Dayton, Ohio from 1939 to 1940. As chief of that division, which was headquartered in Washington, he served from 1940 to 1942. In March 1942, a reorganization changed his title to commanding general, Materiel Command, in the Army Air Forces headquarters—a position changed a year later to assistant chief of staff for materiel, maintenance and distribution. Until April 1945 Echols continued to play the major role in the production of the prime tools of American airpower.

The real impetus to aircraft production came in May 1940 when President Franklin D. Roosevelt went to Congress with a call for a program of no less than 50,000 "military and naval" aircraft per year for the nation's defense. (The Air Corps and the Navy Bureau of Aeronautics agreed that the Navy would get 12,500 of these.)

A year and a half later, on December 7, 1941, the airframe weight of U.S. aircraft production increased sixfold—from the rate of 20,000,000 lb (9,100,000 kg) per year, to 120,000,000 lb (54,000,000 kg). By November 1942 the production rate had tripled again, to 50,000 aircraft per year. In the following year and a half to June 1944, Echols supervised another tripling of production.

From 1941 on, United States aircraft production was much greater than the combined output of Japan and Germany, and the force of 3,305 combat planes in December 1941 grew to 41,000 in August 1945. Not all of these aircraft were of self-powered metal construction: in March 1942, Echols told the joint Senate–House committee that the Army Air Corps had ordered 1000 wooden gliders, each capable of carrying 50 soldiers.

One of Echols's most important yet little known roles was his membership from 1943 to 1945 on the Air Production Board and on the executive committee of the War Production Board. He represented the Army Air Forces in the committee task of coordination of all production, and the establishment of priorities for use of tools, materiel and manpower within the national war program. Helping to determine the relative strength of air versus land and sea forces of the United States were one of Echols's responsibilities, as was the task of deciding relative strengths of fighter aircraft to light-, medium- and heavy bomber forces.

In early 1939, a combination of Army Air Forces tactical staff under General Arnold and Materiel Division engineers under then-Lieutenant Colonel Echols, prescribed the military requirements around which the B-29 Superfortress was to be built. As Boeing was testing the first prototype, Echols surprised Chief Engineer Wellwood Beall of Boeing by telling him that the Army Air Forces intended to spend $2 billion on the bomber. The first production model was completed in July 1943 and 11 months later B-29s were bombing Japan. He was also responsible on behalf of Arnold for liasing with General Groves for the Manhattan Project requirements.

While at Wright Field and in Washington, Echols was known in the profession as the man chiefly responsible for the long, hard process of bringing a plane into being—planes such as the B-24 Liberator, the B-17 Flying Fortress, the B-50 Superfortress and the B-36 Peacemaker. He helped with the initial planning that led to the B-47 Stratojet and B-52 Stratofortress and the earliest American jet aircraft. Echols participated in the decision to have General Electric reproduce Frank Whittle's W.2B jet engine for American jet fighter designs.

In May 1945, Echols was sent to Germany to re-assemble and administer local government, public health, safety and welfare programs, to supervise education and religion, and to direct all communications. Echols served successively as Chief, Internal Affairs for the U.S. Control Council for Germany, as assistant deputy military governor in Germany, and director of Civil Affairs Division of the War Department Special Staff. Echols helped select government specialists for occupation duty in Japan. Major General Echols retired on December 1, 1946.

== Northrop ==
In civilian life, Echols continued to help strengthen the nation's airpower potential. As president of the Aircraft Industries Association (AIA) from 1947 to 1949, his reputation for vision, decisiveness and good humor became even more widely appreciated.

In August 1947, Echols was called before a War Investigating committee led by Senator Homer Ferguson, to uncover misconduct in wartime contracts given to Howard Hughes. Echols testified that the president's son, Elliott Roosevelt, who as an Army Air Forces major and lieutenant colonel had flown the successful P-38 Lightning photo reconnaissance variant during the North Africa campaign, had put political pressure on the AAF in 1943 to purchase the unneeded Hughes XF-11 photo reconnaissance aircraft over the objections of Echols and Chief of Air Staff Barney M. Giles. The committee uncovered more than $5,000 in entertainment spent on Roosevelt by a paid Hughes publicist.

Echols joined Northrop in 1949 as chairman of the board and chief executive officer. In 1952, Jack Northrop, broken by the cancellation of the B-35 and B-49 projects, gave up running his company to return to pure engineering, and made Echols president and general manager. Under the direction of Echols, Northrop's work force increased from 8,000 to 24,000 employees, and the company's backlog of orders advanced from $70 million to $557 million at the time of his sudden death on May 15, 1954.

== Legacy ==
General of the Air Force Henry H. "Hap" Arnold said of Echols in May 1945:

No one knows better than you the terrific problems we have faced in the development and perfection of our equipment and in obtaining the necessary production. I know of no one who could have carried the Air Force's responsibilities in these fields than you have. The task could never have been done had not the Army Air Forces been represented in these matters by an officer having the full confidence of the Congress, the departments and civilian agencies of government, industry and labor. This trust, as well as my own, has been yours and deservedly. The country, the Army Air Forces and I, personally, owe you a real debt of gratitude.

United States Air Force Brigadier General Benjamin S. Kelsey dedicated his book The Dragon's Teeth? to Echols, writing in 1981 that his

... influence over so many years permeated so many facets of the development, production, and distribution of the aircraft for the Second World War that he might be called "The Man Who Won World War II." Without his wisdom, courage, and inspirational guidance, the weapons that the combat crews used would have been fewer and less potent. The respect that he enjoyed from the aircraft industry, Congress, his superiors, and most of all from his subordinates was due primarily to his impeccable integrity.

A Falcon Scholarship in honor of Echols is sponsored each year by Northrop for a student seeking United States Air Force Academy admission with the intention of becoming an Air Force officer.

== Personal life ==
Echols married Margaret Elizabeth Bailey (1892–1990) of Rockport, Texas on December 28, 1920, in El Paso. They had one daughter, Mary Beirne Echols, born November 28, 1926, in Dayton. The Echols family was living in Greene, Ohio in 1930 at the time of the decade census. In 1940, the family moved to Washington, D.C. so that Echols could be closer to his work in government war production. Mary married in 1948 and delivered two children before Echols died, and two more afterward. Echols was originally buried at Arlington National Cemetery, but his remains were moved to join those of his wife at Rockport Cemetery in Aransas County, Texas after her death in 1990.
