= Robert Milner Echols =

American politician

Robert Milner Echols (1798–1847) was an American politician and soldier.

Born near Washington, Georgia, March 18, 1798, Echols was raised in Walton County near Walnut Grove. He was a member of the Georgia General Assembly from 1824 to 1829, and the Georgia State Senate from 1830 to 1844, including six (non-consecutive) years as that body's president. In a race for the United States House of Representatives, Echols lost to his opponent, Gen. Howell Cobb, by only two votes. He was a major general in the Georgia Militia, 11th Division, in 1833.

Echols served as a brigadier general in the U.S. Army during the Mexican–American War, and was fatally injured in a fall from his horse while on dress parade at National Bridge, Mexico, December 3, 1847. Several years after his death, the General Assembly passed an appropriation to have his remains relocated to his home in Walton County, where he was interred with full military honors.

Echols County, Georgia, is named in his honor.
