= Dorothy Jung Echols =

American geologist (1916–1997)

- Born: Dorothy Ann Elizabeth Jung; September 9, 1916; Bronx, New York
- Died: February 4, 1997 (aged 80); St. Louis, Missouri
- Education: New York University (BA), Columbia University (MA)
- Occupations: Professor Emeritus, Geologist
- Spouse: Leonard S. Echols
- Children: 4 Leonard S. Echols III, Jon Jung Echols, Lizette DePue Echols, William Ring Echols
- Family: Lizette von Gal (sister)
- Awards: Neil Miner Award

Dorothy Jung Echols (September 9, 1916–February 4, 1997) was an American geologist, micropaleontologist, and educator. She worked in the petroleum industry from 1938 to 1946, a period during which relatively few women were employed as geologists. She later taught at Washington University in St. Louis from 1951 until her retirement in 1982. She died at the age of 80 in St. Louis, Missouri.

== Biography ==
Echols was born in the Bronx, New York, on September 9, 1916. As a high school student, Echols developed an interest in minerals. She began a personal mineral collection in 1922, which later became part of New York University’s teaching collection.

She graduated from New York University in 1936 with a Bachelor of Arts degree in geology. During her studies, she was captain of the varsity swim team from 1934 to 1935, a member of the Women's Swimming Association, and received the 1935 recipient of the Florence Frankel Medal for swimming.

She completed her master's degree in geology from Columbia University in 1938. She then moved to Houston, Texas, where she worked for three years as a geologist and micropaleontologist at Republic Production Company.

In 1941, she married Leonard S. Echols, a research chemist at Shell, and moved to New York. They had four children: Leonard S. Echols III, Jon Jung Echols, Lizette DePue Echols, and William Ring Echols.

Between 1941 and 1942, she was an assistant to the chief geologist at the Texas Company in New York. In 1942, the family moved to St. Louis. From 1946 to 1951, Echols worked as a geologic consultant for Pond Fork Oil and Gas Company. In 1948, she became a laboratory instructor in the Department of Geology at Washington University. In 1951, she was hired as a research associate in the department to fill the position previously held by Betty Kellet Nadeau. She remained on the faculty until her retirement in 1982.

Her husband, Leonard, who served as Shell's chief engineer in St. Louis, died in 1963.

Echols was diagnosed with lung cancer in early 1997, and died on February 4, 1997.

== Contributions to geology ==
Echols worked in the petroleum industry from 1938 to 1946, a period during which women were underrepresented among geologists in the field. Her subsequent career largely focused on micropaleontology, with an emphasis on microfossils. In 1948, she co-authored a publication with Doris Malkin Curtis, titled "Wilcox (Eocene) Stratigraphy, a Key to Production". The paper analyzed Eocene Wilcox Group stratigraphy and its implications for petroleum exploration in Texas, Louisiana, and Mississippi. It examined Wilcox Group sedimentation patterns to identify trends relevant to petroleum production in productive sands across Texas, Louisiana, and Mississippi through 1945. This study described the relationship between the Wilcox and the Midway Sea, addressing petroleum accumulation in the region through analysis of depositional environments and associated materials. It concluded that hydrocarbons migrated into permeable sands and were trapped beneath an overlying seal.

== Contribution to the Deep Sea Drilling Project ==
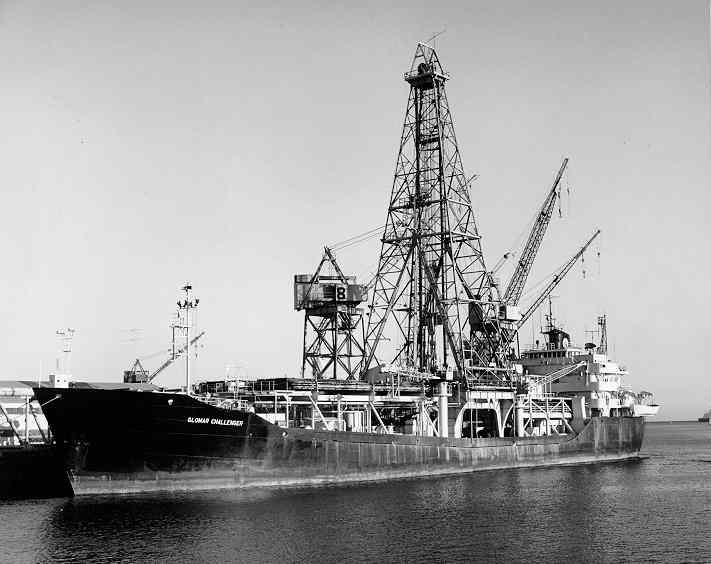
The Deep Sea Drilling Project lasted from 1968 to 1983.

Echols participated in the Deep Sea Drilling Project (DSDP), a scientific research program focused on investigating the composition and structure of the Earth's oceanic crust through drilling and coring beneath the ocean floor. Initiated in 1968, the project enabled direct sampling of deep ocean basins and contributed to research in oceanography and geology, such as the history of its oceans, the development of its crust, and the processes associated with plate tectonics.

The project used the drilling vessel Glomar Challenger to recover samples of sediment and basaltic crust from multiple depths and locations across the world's oceans. These samples were used to test and evaluate theories such as plate tectonics and seafloor spreading. Analysis of the cores provided data on the age and distribution of oceanic crust and information about past climate conditions through the study of sediment layers.

Echols's role as a sedimentologist and micropaleontologist involved analyzing recovered cores for microfossil content, including remains of organisms such as foraminifera, diatoms, and coccolithophores. These microfossils were used to date sediments and reconstruct past environmental conditions, supporting interpretations of Earth's climatic and geological history.

== Awards and achievements ==
=== Career milestones ===
- Echols was among the earlier women working in field geology.
- In 1952, she became one of the first women geologists employed by Standard Oil of New Jersey (later Exxon), specializing in micropaleontology for hydrocarbon exploration.
- From 1968 to 1972, she served as the only woman member of the scientific team for DSDP Legs 11 and 19, where her work involved analysis of sediment cores recovered from the Atlantic Ocean.
- In 1979, she co-founded Curtis and Echols Geological Consultants with Doris Malkin Curtis. The firm applied sequence stratigraphy techniques in oil exploration.

=== Major honors ===
Selected awards
Year	Award	Rationale
1975	American Association of Petroleum Geologists Distinguished Service Award	For pioneering micropaleontological methods in oil exploration
1982	NAGT Neil Miner Award	Excellence in earth science education at Washington University in St. Louis
1987	Geological Society of America Fellow	Lifetime contributions to marine geology and petroleum exploration

=== Professional recognition ===
- Listed in Marquis Who's Who from 1976 to 1996 as a geological consultant
- Delivered the 1985 Paleontological Society Distinguished Lecture on "Foraminifera as Paleoenvironmental Indicators"
- Served on the National Science Foundation Oceanography Advisory Panel (1978–1981)

== Publications ==
Echols published research throughout her academic and professional career.

Year	Publication
1954	New Paleozoic Ostracode Genera and Species Reported in Three Russian Publications
1958	Three dimensional graptolites in the Maquoketa shale (Upper Ordovician) of Missouri
1959	Survey of Mississippian, Pennsylvanian, and Permian Ostracoda recorded in the United States
1964	Chalk crayons and microfossil contamination
1965	Precambrian Graphitic Compressions of Possible Biologic Origin from Canada
1967	Naked Foraminifera from Shallow-Water Environments: ABSTRACT
1967	Naked foraminifera from shallow water environments
1969	Some Comparisons of Neogene Microbiostratigraphy in Offshore Louisiana and Blake Plateau: ABSTRACT
1979	Chronicle of Miocene, Phase III: Middle Miocene Events: ABSTRACT
1981	Environmental Adaptations of Elphidium subarcticum: ABSTRACT
1985	"Bolboforma": A Miocene Algae of Possible Biostratigraphic and Paleoclimatic Value
1987	Prediction of sands in low stand wedges using biostratigraphy, in Innovative biostratigraphic approaches to sequence analysis (with Curtis D.M)
1987	Applications of geochronology to stratigraphic interpretation and correlation (with Curtis D.M)

In 1956, Echols contributed to the Journal of Paleontology. She co-authored papers with John J. Gouty on Fern Glen (Mississippian) Ostracoda, Bruce L. Stinchcomb on Missouri Upper Cambrian Monoplacophora, which had previously been classified as cephalopods, and Courtney Werner on three-dimensional graptolites in the Maquoketa Shale (Upper Ordovician) of Missouri. The publications reported on fossil material and rock samples collected during field investigations. Echols and Gouty, in their studies of Fern Glen Ostracoda, divided the study area into four sections for sampling and analysis of ostracods-bearing sediments. Echols and Stinchcomb identified fossils previously interpreted as breviconic cephalopods as Monoplacophora of the genus Hypseloconus. The fossils exhibited cone-shaped and curved morphologies. Echols and Werner published their findings on the Maquoketa shale of Missouri, a light brown shale containing a diverse assemblage of fauna, including ostracods, bryozoans, brachiopods, conodonts, pelecypods, and abundant fragments of uncompressed and replaced graptolites preserved within the formation. The uncompressed graptolites were assigned to the genus Climacograptus, possibly the species Climacograptus putillus.
