= Echols County, Georgia =

County in Georgia, United States

- County
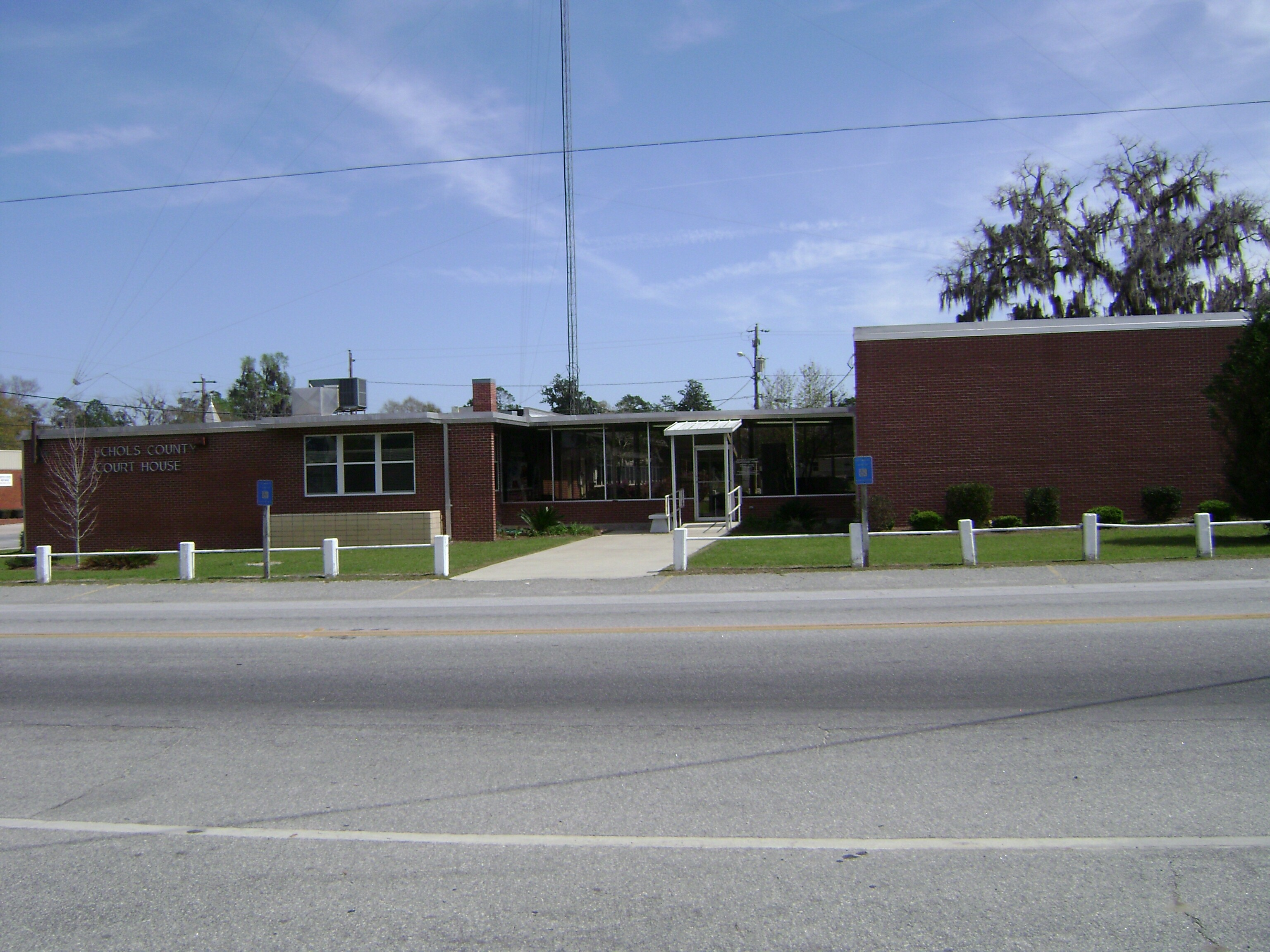
- Echols County Courthouse in Statenville

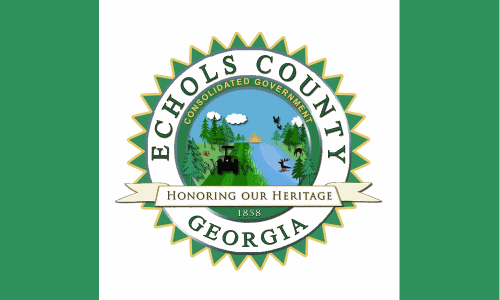
- Flag

- Location within the U.S. state of Georgia
- Coordinates: 30°43′N 82°54′W
- Country: United States
- State: Georgia
- Founded: December 13, 1858; 167 years ago
- Named for: Robert Milner Echols
- Seat: Statenville
- Largest community: Statenville

Area
  - Total: 421 sq mi (1,090 km^{2})
  - Land: 415 sq mi (1,070 km^{2})
  - Water: 5.8 sq mi (15 km^{2}) 1.4%

Population (2020)
  - Total: 3,697
  - Estimate (2025): 3,685 ▼
  - Density: 8.91/sq mi (3.44/km^{2})
- Time zone: UTC−5 (Eastern)
  - Summer (DST): UTC−4 (EDT)
- Congressional district: 1st
- Website: echolscountyga.com

Echols County (/ˈɛkəlz/) is a county located in the southeastern part of the U.S. state of Georgia. As of the 2020 census, the population was 3,697. The county seat is Statenville. Since 2008, Statenville is a disincorporated municipality. Echols and Webster counties are the only two counties in Georgia to currently have no incorporated municipalities. The county was established in 1858 and named in honor of Robert Milner Echols. Echols County is part of the Valdosta metropolitan area.

== History ==
On December 13, 1858, the Georgia General Assembly passed a bill establishing Echols County from a south-eastern section of Lowndes County and a south-western section Clinch County. The original borders of the county were a line from the mouth of the Suwanoochee Creek directly south to the state line, then along the state line, then north to the junction of Grand Bay Creek and Mud Swamp, then up the course of Grand Bay Creek to Carter's Ford, then a direct line to where Cow's Creek enters the Alapaha River, then up the creek to Griffins' Mill, then a direct line to Jack's Fort on Suwanoochee Creek, and then down Suwanoochee Creek to its mouth. With the exception of some minor adjustments of the border Echols shares with Lowndes and the loss of a thin strip to Florida following Florida v. Georgia, the borders of Echols County has changed little since its establishment. Statenville was declared the county seat in 1859.

At the time of the 1860 census, Echols County had a white population of 1,177, with 314 slaves, and no free people of color.

Echols County became notable as it has served as a place of banishment for many of Georgia's criminals. As the Georgia State Constitution forbids banishment beyond the borders of the state, officials instead ban the offender from 158 of Georgia's 159 counties, with Echols remaining as their only option. Few criminals have been documented as actually moving to Echols. This is because almost all banished criminals choose to leave the state instead of moving to Echols County.

Banishment, including 158-county banishment, has repeatedly been upheld by Georgia courts. The first case when banishment was upheld was in the 1974 case State v Collett, when the Georgia Supreme Court upheld the banishment of a drug dealer from seven counties. The most recent time banishment was upheld, in 2011, the Georgia Supreme Court ruled it was constitutional to banish David Nathan Thompson (a mentally ill man who was convicted of firing a gun into a home, although no one was injured) from all but one county in Georgia.

== Geography ==
According to the U.S. Census Bureau, the county has a total area of 421 square miles (1,090 km^{2}), of which 415 square miles (1,070 km^{2}) is land and 5.8 square miles (15 km^{2}) (1.4%) is water. The county contains a notable swamp, Whitehead Bay.

The western half of Echols County is located in the Alapaha River sub-basin of the Suwannee River basin. The eastern half of the county, from well east of Statenville to just west of Fargo, is located in the Upper Suwannee River sub-basin of the same Suwannee River basin.

=== Major highways ===
- U.S. Route 41 / State Route 7
- U.S. Route 129 / State Route 11
- U.S. Route 441 / State Route 89
- State Route 94
- State Route 135
- State Route 187
- State Route 376

=== Major waterways ===
- Alapaha River
- Alapahoochee River
- Grand Bay Creek (known in the 1800s as Irwin's River and later as Irwin's Creek)
- Suwannee River
- Suwanoochee Creek

=== Railways ===
- Georgia Southern and Florida Railway
- Seaboard Coast Line Railroad
- Plant System (now part of CSX)
- Statenville Railway (Defunct, it was used from 1910 to 1924. It ran from Statenville to Haylow, Georgia)

=== Adjacent counties ===
- Clinch County – northeast
- Columbia County, Florida – southeast
- Hamilton County, Florida – south
- Lowndes County – west
- Lanier County – north

=== Unincorporated communities ===
- Fruitland
- Howell
- Needmore
- Statenville (county seat)

=== Extinct town ===
- Tarver (formerly Statenville Station and Huckleberry)

== Demographics ==
Historical population
Census	Pop.	Note	%±
1860	1,491		—
1870	1,978		32.7%
1880	2,553		29.1%
1890	3,079		20.6%
1900	3,209		4.2%
1910	3,309		3.1%
1920	3,313		0.1%
1930	2,744		−17.2%
1940	2,964		8.0%
1950	2,494		−15.9%
1960	1,876		−24.8%
1970	1,924		2.6%
1980	2,297		19.4%
1990	2,334		1.6%
2000	3,754		60.8%
2010	4,034		7.5%
2020	3,697		−8.4%
2025 (est.)	3,685	▼	−0.3%
U.S. Decennial Census; 1790-1880 1890-1910; 1920-1930 1930-1940; 1940-1950 1960-1980; 1980-2000 2010 2020

=== Racial and ethnic composition ===
Echols County, Georgia – Racial and ethnic composition Note: the US Census treats Hispanic/Latino as an ethnic category. This table excludes Latinos from the racial categories and assigns them to a separate category. Hispanics/Latinos may be of any race.
Race / Ethnicity (NH = Non-Hispanic)	Pop 1980	Pop 1990	Pop 2000	Pop 2010	Pop 2020	% 1980	% 1990	% 2000	% 2010	% 2020
White alone (NH)	1,860	1,990	2,688	2,555	2,328	80.98%	85.26%	71.60%	63.34%	62.97%
Black or African American alone (NH)	374	257	252	163	147	16.28%	11.01%	6.71%	4.04%	3.98%
Native American or Alaska Native alone (NH)	39	40	43	55	37	1.70%	1.71%	1.15%	1.36%	1.00%
Asian alone (NH)	0	2	3	12	8	0.00%	0.09%	0.08%	0.30%	0.22%
Native Hawaiian or Pacific Islander alone (NH)	x	x	0	1	0	x	x	0.00%	0.02%	0.00%
Other race alone (NH)	0	0	1	9	2	0.00%	0.00%	0.03%	0.22%	0.05%
Mixed race or Multiracial (NH)	x	x	28	56	84	x	x	0.75%	1.39%	2.27%
Hispanic or Latino (any race)	24	45	739	1,183	1,091	1.04%	1.93%	19.69%	29.33%	29.51%
Total	2,297	2,334	3,754	4,034	3,697	100.00%	100.00%	100.00%	100.00%	100.00%

=== 2020 census ===
As of the 2020 census, there were 3,697 people, 1,286 households, and 1,097 families residing in the county. The median age was 37.2 years, 26.7% of residents were under the age of 18, and 14.4% of residents were 65 years of age or older.

For every 100 females there were 101.0 males, and for every 100 females age 18 and over there were 101.9 males age 18 and over. No residents lived in urban areas while 100.0% lived in rural areas.

The racial makeup of the county was 68.5% White, 4.2% Black or African American, 1.8% American Indian and Alaska Native, 0.3% Asian, 0.0% Native Hawaiian and Pacific Islander, 14.7% from some other race, and 10.4% from two or more races. Hispanic or Latino residents of any race comprised 29.5% of the population.

There were 1,286 households in the county, of which 37.6% had children under the age of 18 living with them and 22.6% had a female householder with no spouse or partner present. About 19.5% of all households were made up of individuals and 9.4% had someone living alone who was 65 years of age or older.

There were 1,531 housing units, of which 16.0% were vacant. Among occupied housing units, 69.3% were owner-occupied and 30.7% were renter-occupied. The homeowner vacancy rate was 0.4% and the rental vacancy rate was 10.0%.

== Education ==
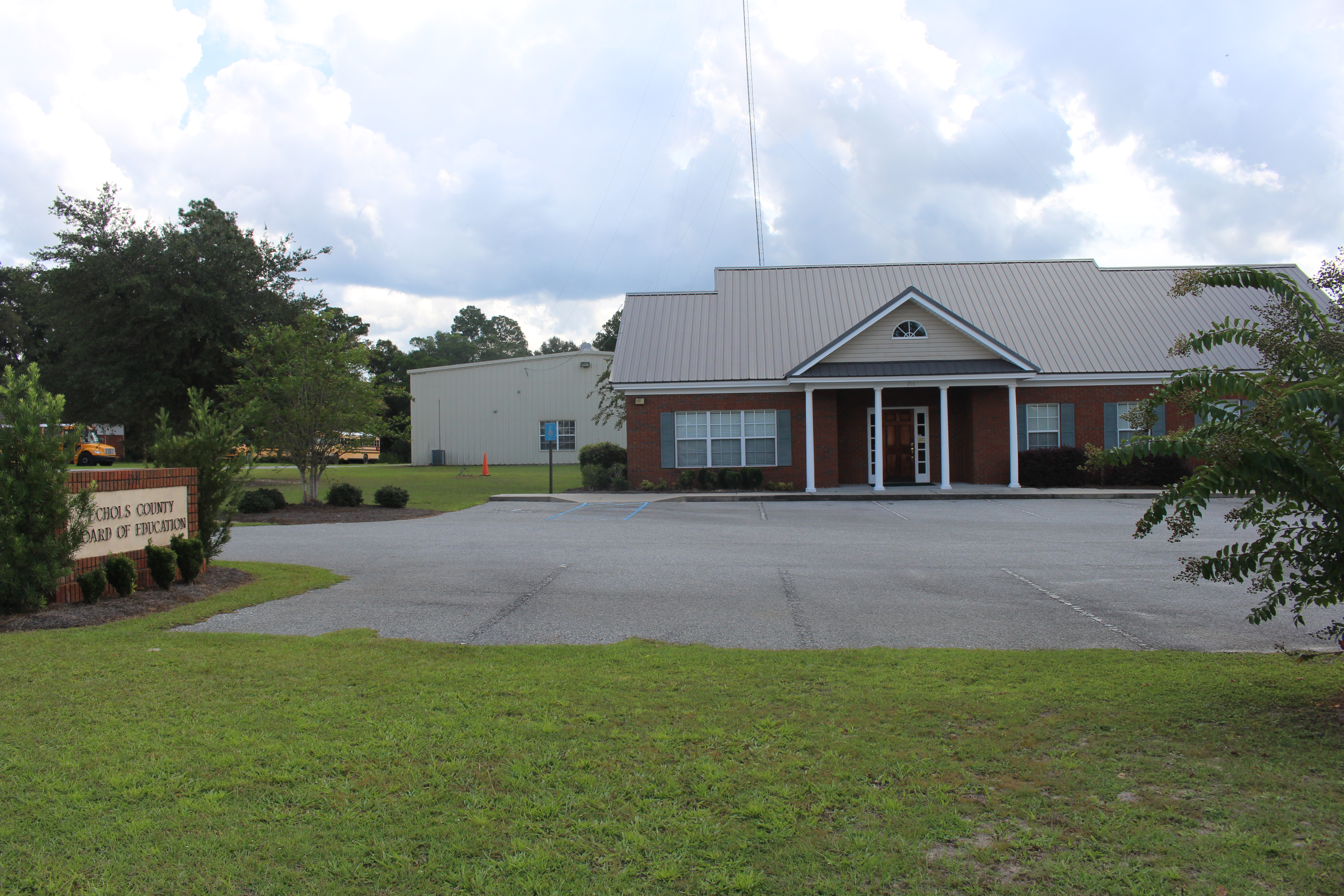
Echols County School District headquarters

Echols County School District, the only school district in the county, operates public schools.

== Politics ==
Echols County is one of the most Republican counties in Georgia, having voted over 90% for Donald Trump in 2024. For elections to the United States House of Representatives, Echols County is part of Georgia's 8th congressional district, currently represented by Austin Scott. For elections to the Georgia State Senate, Echols County is part of District 8, currently represented by Russ Goodman. For elections to the Georgia House of Representatives, Echols County is part of District 174, currently represented by John Corbett.

United States presidential election results for Echols County, Georgia
Year	Republican		Democratic		Third party(ies)	
Year	No.	%	No.	%	No.	%
1880	40	17.78%	185	82.22%	0	0.00%
1884	91	32.85%	186	67.15%	0	0.00%
1888	43	21.72%	150	75.76%	5	2.53%
1892	54	16.07%	270	80.36%	12	3.57%
1896	52	22.91%	174	76.65%	1	0.44%
1900	38	22.62%	130	77.38%	0	0.00%
1904	12	7.02%	159	92.98%	0	0.00%
1908	15	9.68%	140	90.32%	0	0.00%
1912	0	0.00%	144	97.30%	4	2.70%
1916	0	0.00%	173	100.00%	0	0.00%
1924	11	2.22%	482	97.37%	2	0.40%
1928	29	8.45%	314	91.55%	0	0.00%
1932	5	1.19%	414	98.81%	0	0.00%
1936	30	9.06%	300	90.63%	1	0.30%
1940	18	3.91%	441	95.87%	1	0.22%
1944	42	8.27%	466	91.73%	0	0.00%
1948	32	5.14%	332	53.38%	258	41.48%
1952	94	15.02%	532	84.98%	0	0.00%
1956	134	20.24%	528	79.76%	0	0.00%
1960	108	29.59%	257	70.41%	0	0.00%
1964	399	68.44%	184	31.56%	0	0.00%
1968	53	8.26%	56	8.72%	533	83.02%
1972	404	85.59%	68	14.41%	0	0.00%
1976	111	15.95%	585	84.05%	0	0.00%
1980	259	33.08%	515	65.77%	9	1.15%
1984	453	66.62%	227	33.38%	0	0.00%
1988	422	62.99%	245	36.57%	3	0.45%
1992	361	39.63%	312	34.25%	238	26.13%
1996	335	45.09%	308	41.45%	100	13.46%
2000	614	68.37%	272	30.29%	12	1.34%
2004	757	76.39%	231	23.31%	3	0.30%
2008	981	82.58%	201	16.92%	6	0.51%
2012	917	82.99%	173	15.66%	15	1.36%
2016	1,007	85.19%	156	13.20%	19	1.61%
2020	1,256	87.10%	167	11.58%	19	1.32%
2024	1,307	90.89%	127	8.83%	4	0.28%

United States Senate election results for Echols County, Georgia2
Year	Republican		Democratic		Third party(ies)	
Year	No.	%	No.	%	No.	%
2020	1,232	86.88%	162	11.42%	24	1.69%
2020	1,057	89.05%	130	10.95%	0	0.00%

United States Senate election results for Echols County, Georgia3
Year	Republican		Democratic		Third party(ies)	
Year	No.	%	No.	%	No.	%
2020	558	40.41%	36	2.61%	787	56.99%
2020	1,058	89.21%	128	10.79%	0	0.00%
2022	937	88.40%	100	9.43%	23	2.17%
2022	861	90.73%	88	9.27%	0	0.00%

Georgia Gubernatorial election results for Echols County
Year	Republican		Democratic		Third party(ies)	
Year	No.	%	No.	%	No.	%
2022	956	89.77%	94	8.83%	15	1.41%

== See also ==
- National Register of Historic Places listings in Echols County, Georgia
- State of Georgia v. Allison
- List of counties in Georgia
