= William Holding Echols (professor) =

American academic (1859–1934)

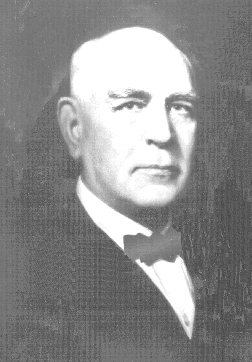
William Holding Echols

William Holding Echols VI (December 2, 1859 – September 25, 1934), generally called "Reddy" Echols, was a professor of mathematics at the University of Virginia. The Echols Scholars Program is named in his honor. William Echols was the son of the fifth of the same name who was a Major in Confederate States of America.

Echols attended the university as an undergraduate and received his Bachelor of Science and a civil engineering degree from the university in 1882. Following his graduation, he became an engineering professor, and later director, of the Missouri School of Mines (now Missouri University of Science and Technology). He returned to UVA as adjunct professor of mathematics in 1891, teaching mechanical engineering and serving as the building and grounds supervisor.

On October 27, 1895, a fire started in the Rotunda Annex on the UVA grounds. Echols, in a dramatic attempt to save the Rotunda, attempted to use dynamite to destroy the roofed portico that connected the Annex and the Rotunda and keep the fire from spreading to the historic building. Unfortunately, despite his attempt to hurl 50 pounds of dynamite to the portico from atop the Rotunda dome, the portico held, the fire spread more rapidly than before, and the Rotunda was gutted by the blaze.

In later years, Echols authored a text on elementary calculus. He remained active in University life and was a member of Eli Banana. He died of a heart attack in his home on the East Lawn in 1934 and is buried in the university cemetery.

== Personal life ==
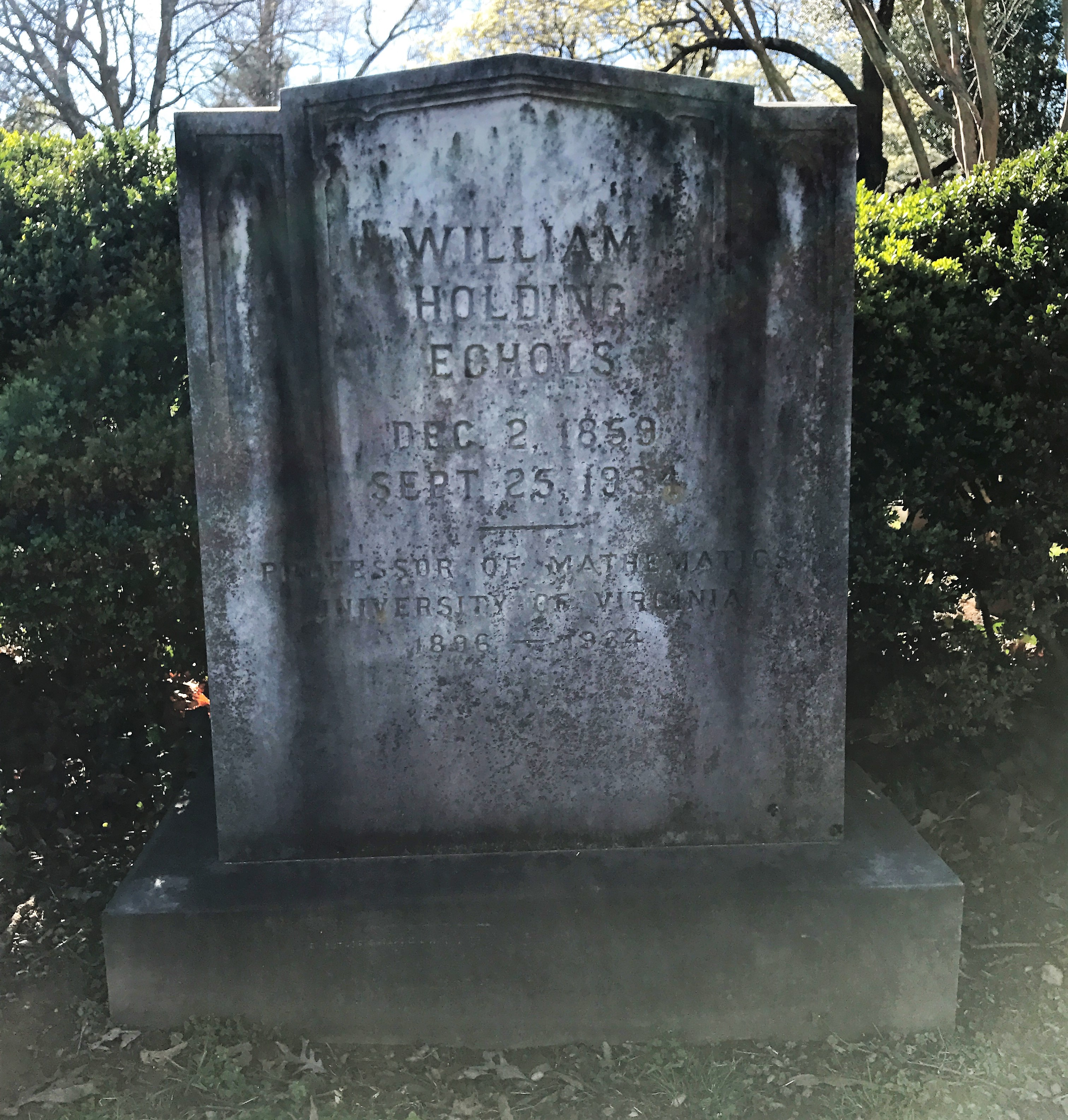
Echols's gravestone at the University of Virginia Cemetery in Charlottesville, Virginia.

Echols was the son of William Holding Echols, a noted Confederate soldier. He was the father of Oliver P. Echols, a prominent military officer during World War II.

== Selected publications ==
- On a general formula for the expansion of functions in series. Bull. Amer. Math. Soc. 2 (1893) 135–144. MR 1557227
- Wronski's expansion. Bull. Amer. Math. Soc. 2 (1893) 178–184. MR 1557241
