= William Holding Echols (soldier) =

American soldier (1834–1909)

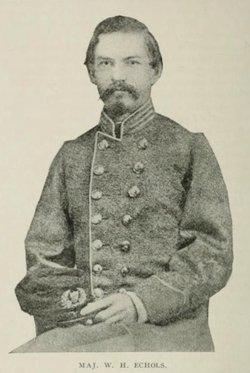
Maj. W. H. Echols

William Holding Echols (March 11, 1834–November 13, 1909) was an American soldier who fought for the Confederacy as a Major in the American Civil War. He was known for his involvement with the United States Camel Corps.

== Early life and career ==
Echols was born in Huntsville, Alabama. He received his primary education at Green Academy, in Huntsville; then he engaged in business in Huntsville, and also for one year in Mississippi. Receiving an appointment as cadet, he entered the United States Military Academy at West Point July 1, 1854, and was graduated fourth in his class on July 1, 1858, at which date he received his commission in the army and was assigned as brevet second lieutenant to the Corps of Topographical Engineers. He was retained at West Point as instructor in the Military Academy until September, 1858. In October of that year he was ordered to Fort Vancouver, W. T., for duty at Headquarters Department of Oregon. This order was subsequently changed, and Lieutenant Echols was assigned to the Department of Texas with headquarters at San Antonio, where he served until the breaking out of the Civil War.

In the capacity of engineer in charge of the survey Lieutenant Echols for two years made expeditions throughout Northwest Texas with camels, imported by the government for that purpose, in search of available routes through those arid wastes to the California coast. As part of the United States Camel Corps, he accompanied Edward L. Hartz to the Big Bend region of Texas on the first camel expedition, before leading a second expedition to the Rio Grande in 1860.

== Confederacy service ==
Lieutenant Echols resigned from the United States army on March 21, 1861, and joined the Confederate army. He was appointed by President Davis as captain of engineers in the regular Confederate army on March 29, 1861, and was assigned to duty as engineer in charge of Fort Jackson and St. Philip, Louisiana, whence, after a brief service, he was ordered on April 17, 1861, to Savannah, Georgia, where he was employed as chief engineer in charge of defenses, in building fortifications, and also in organizing and drilling troops.

He was commissioned on December 30, 1861, by Gov. Joseph E. Brown, of Georgia, as colonel of the 29th Georgia Volunteers, a position which he greatly desired to accept. But, notwithstanding General Lawton's indorsement of his cause, Davis wrote him: "The number of engineer officers in our service is quite too small to permit them being placed in command of troops." He was then promoted to be major of engineers, and as chief engineer of South Carolina was ordered to the defense of Charleston Harbor, where he served until the evacuation of Charleston, in 1865. He was proceeding on his way through North Carolina to join the Army of Virginia when the surrender took place.

== Later career ==
Major Echols returned to his native place, Huntsville, where in 1866 he served as civil engineer on the Memphis and Charleston Railroad. In 1868 he rehabilitated and reorganized the Bell Factory Cotton Mills, one of the oldest cotton mills in the South. He subsequently became President of the First National Bank of Huntsville, the duties of which position he continued to perform until a few months before his death, on November 13, 1909.

== Personal life ==
Major Echols's grandfather, William Echols, went from Pittsylvania County, Virginia to Alabama in 1816. His father, also William Echols, at that time sixteen years of age, continued a resident of Alabama the remainder of his life.

Major Echols was married in Huntsville January 19, 1859, to Mary Beirne Patton, daughter of Dr. Charles H. Patton and Susan Beirne Patton. He was survived by his wife, two sons, and a daughter, Mrs. Robert E. Spragins, of Huntsville. One son was Col. Charles P. Echols, of the United States army, later Professor of Mathematics at the Military Academy at West Point; he was murdered in 1940. the other son, William H. Echols Jr., was a Professor of Mathematics at the University of Virginia.

Echols was Episcopalian, a Freemason, and a Knight of Pythias.
