= Johnny Echols (baseball) =

American baseball player (1916–1972)

- Pinch runner
- Born: January 9, 1916; Atlanta, Georgia
- Died: November 12, 1972 (aged 56); DeKalb County, Georgia
- Batted: Right Threw: Right

MLB debut
- May 24, 1939, for the St. Louis Cardinals

Last MLB appearance
- May 29, 1939, for the St. Louis Cardinals

MLB statistics
- Games played: 2
- At bats: 0
- Stats at Baseball Reference

Teams
- St. Louis Cardinals (1939)

John Gresham Echols (January 9, 1916 – November 12, 1972) was a Major League Baseball player. Echols pinch ran in two games with the St. Louis Cardinals in 1939.
