= Statenville, Georgia =

- Unincorporated community Former census-designated place
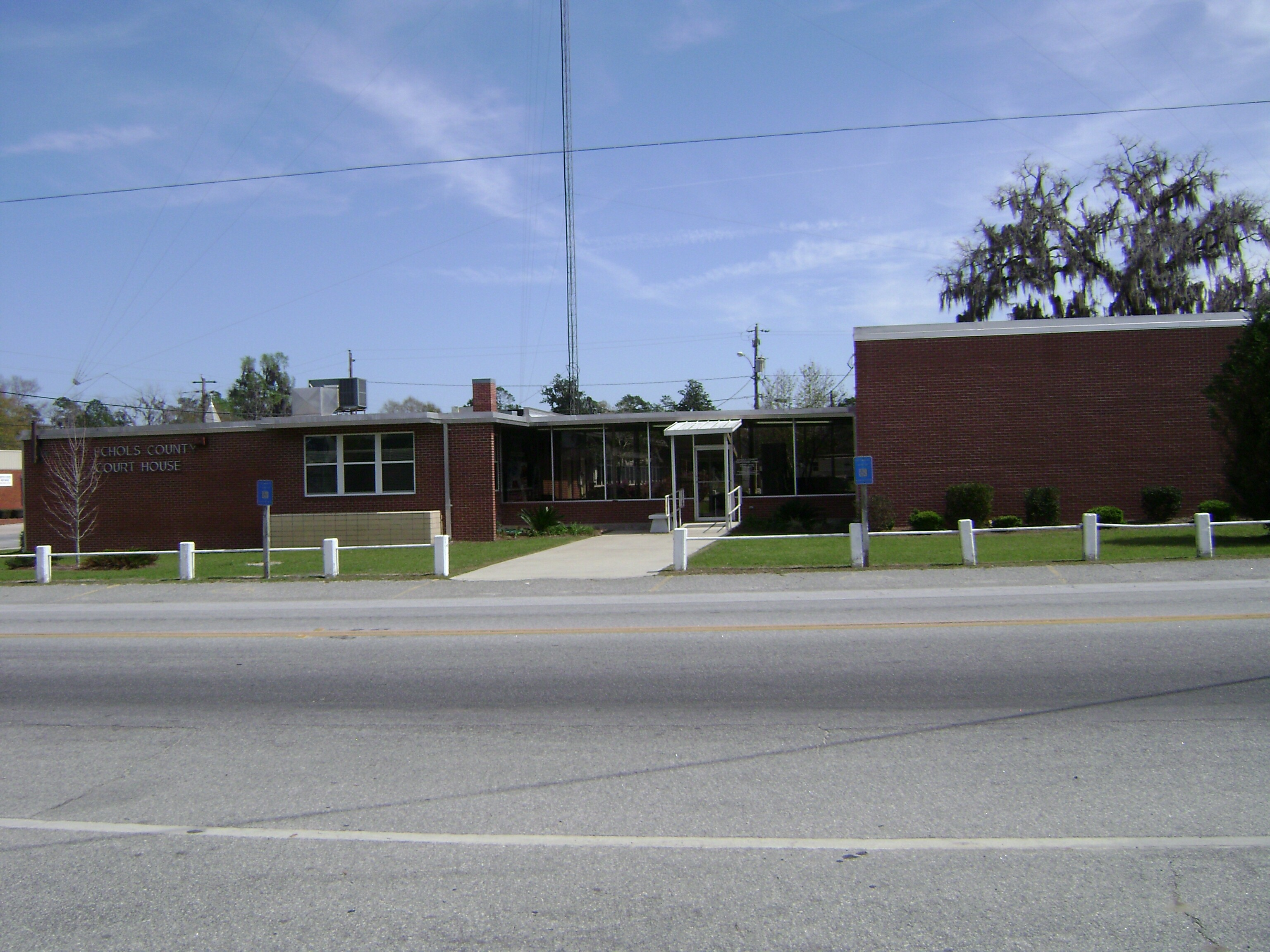
- Echols County Courthouse in Statenville

- Location within the state of Georgia Statenville (the United States)
- Coordinates: 30°42′11″N 83°1′40″W
- Country: United States
- State: Georgia
- County: Echols

Area
  - Total: 4.6 sq mi (12.0 km^{2})
  - Land: 4.6 sq mi (12.0 km^{2})
  - Water: 0 sq mi (0.0 km^{2})
- Elevation: 138 ft (42 m)

Population (2010)
  - Total: 1,040
  - Density: 230/sq mi (87/km^{2})
- Time zone: UTC-5 (Eastern (EST))
  - Summer (DST): UTC-4 (EDT)
- ZIP code: 31648
- Area code: 229
- FIPS code: 13-73200
- GNIS feature ID: 356558

Statenville is an unincorporated community in and the county seat of Echols County, Georgia, United States. It was formerly a census-designated place (CDP) with a population of 1,040 at the 2010 census. The ZIP code is 31648, and the area code 229.

== History ==
The town of Statenville was originally called Troublesome. It grew up at a ford on the Alapaha River in the 1850s. Troublesome was renamed Statenville when the latter was designated county seat in 1858 of the newly-formed Echols County. It is named for James Watson Staten, but was erroneously incorporated as "Statesville" in 1859. In 1965, the state officially amended the city's charter to read "Statenville". In 1995, a new state law revoked the city charter, along with dozens of others in Georgia which had inactive governments. This left Echols and Webster as the only counties in Georgia with no incorporated communities.

In July 2008, a referendum passed to consolidate the city with Echols County by a margin of 639 to 245.

== Geography ==
Statenville is located in western Echols County, just east of the Alapaha River. U.S. Route 129 passes through the community, leading north 27 miles (43 km) to Lakeland, south 6 miles (10 km) to the Florida border, and south 14 miles (23 km) to Jasper, Florida. Georgia State Route 94 crosses US 129 in the center of Statenville, leading east 28 miles (45 km) to Fargo and northwest 18 miles (29 km) to Valdosta.

According to the U.S. Census Bureau, the Statenville CDP has a total area of 11.96 square kilometres (4.62 sq mi), all land.

== Education ==
The Echols County School District consists of two schools. The district has 40 full-time teachers and over 700 students.

The South Georgia Regional Library operates the Hansford Allen Echols County Library. Named after timber and turpentine farmer Handsford Allen, who contributed money towards the establishment of the library, it is the smallest library in the system. It opened on July 19, 1992, with its construction funded by State of Georgia money. The community previously had its library in other locations: first in a Methodist church and later in the school district superintendent's courthouse office.

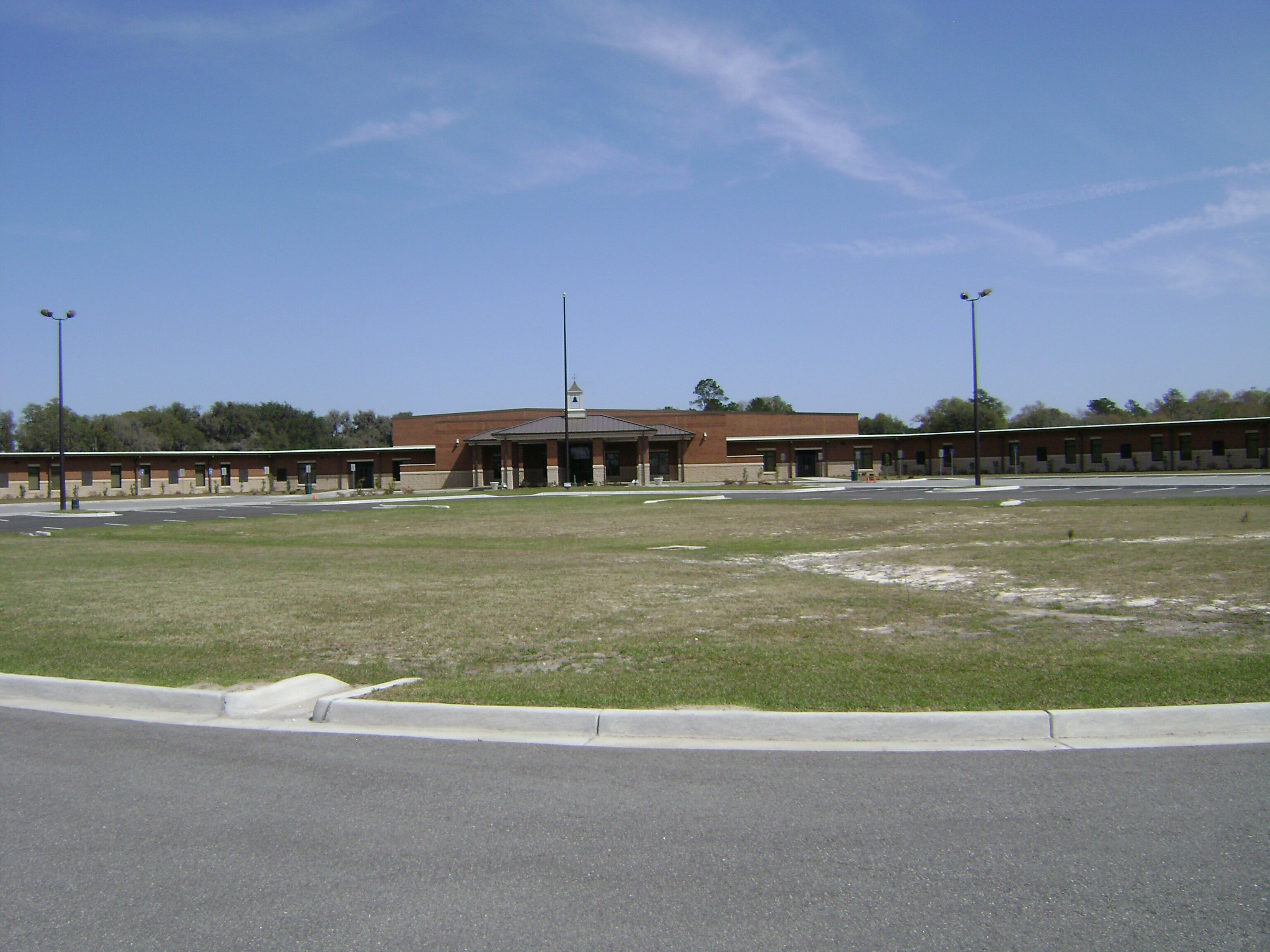
Echols County Schools

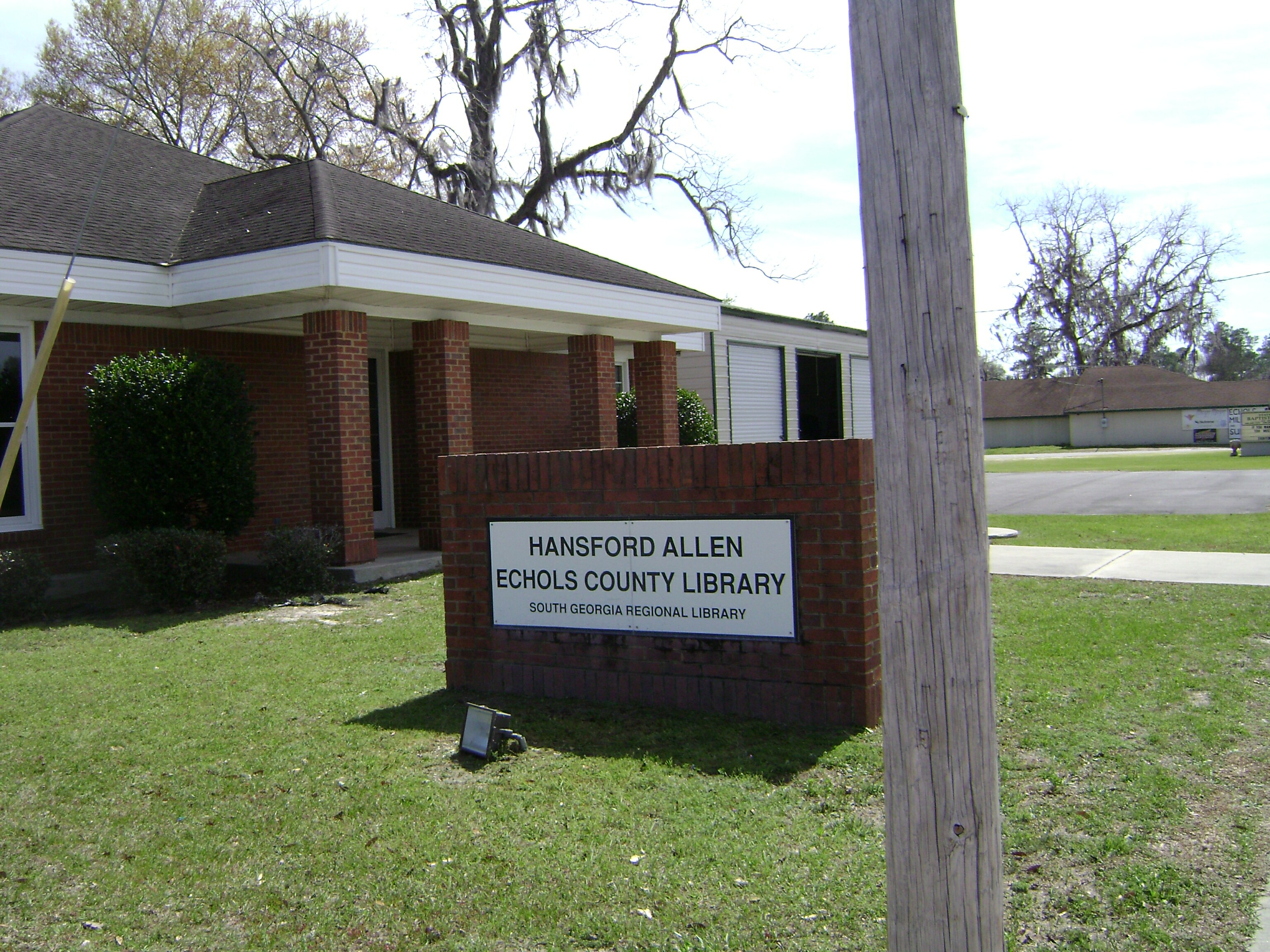
Hansford Allen Echols County Library

== Demographics ==
Historical population
| Census | Pop. | Note | %± |
|---|---|---|---|
| 2010 | 1,040 | | — |
U.S. Decennial Census; 1850-1870 1870-1880; 1890-1910 1920-1930; 1940 1950 1960; 1970 1980 1990; 2000 2010

Statenville appeared as a census designated place in the 2010 U.S. census. It no longer was listed thereafter due to consolidation with the county in 2008.

Statenville, Georgia – Racial and ethnic composition Note: the U.S. census treats Hispanic/Latino as an ethnic category. This table excludes Latinos from the racial categories and assigns them to a separate category. Hispanics/Latinos may be of any race.
| Race / Ethnicity (NH = Non-Hispanic) | Pop 2010 | % 2010 |
|---|---|---|
| White alone (NH) | 560 | 53.85% |
| Black or African American alone (NH) | 121 | 11.63% |
| Native American or Alaska Native alone (NH) | 22 | 2.12% |
| Asian alone (NH) | 9 | 0.87% |
| Pacific Islander alone (NH) | 1 | 0.10% |
| Some Other Race alone (NH) | 0 | 0.00% |
| Mixed Race/Multi-Racial (NH) | 23 | 2.21% |
| Hispanic or Latino (any race) | 304 | 29.23% |
| Total | 1,040 | 100.00% |
