= University of Virginia Darden School of Business =

Graduate-level business school

- Former name: Graduate School of Business Administration (1955–1974)
- Type: Public graduate business school
- Established: 1955
- Parent institution: University of Virginia
- Endowment: $1.1 billion
- Dean: Yael Grushka-Cockayne
- Location: Charlottesville, Virginia, US; 38.052096°N 78.513901°W
- Website: www.darden.virginia.edu

The University of Virginia Darden School of Business (formally the Colgate Darden Graduate School of Business Administration) is the graduate business school of the University of Virginia, a public research university in Charlottesville, Virginia. The school offers MBA, PhD, and Executive Education programs.

The school was founded in 1955 through the efforts of Colgate Whitehead Darden Jr., the president of the University of Virginia from 1947 to 1959 and a former Democratic congressman and governor of Virginia from 1942 to 1946. It is located on the grounds of the University of Virginia. Its faculty use the case method as their method of teaching courses.

== History ==
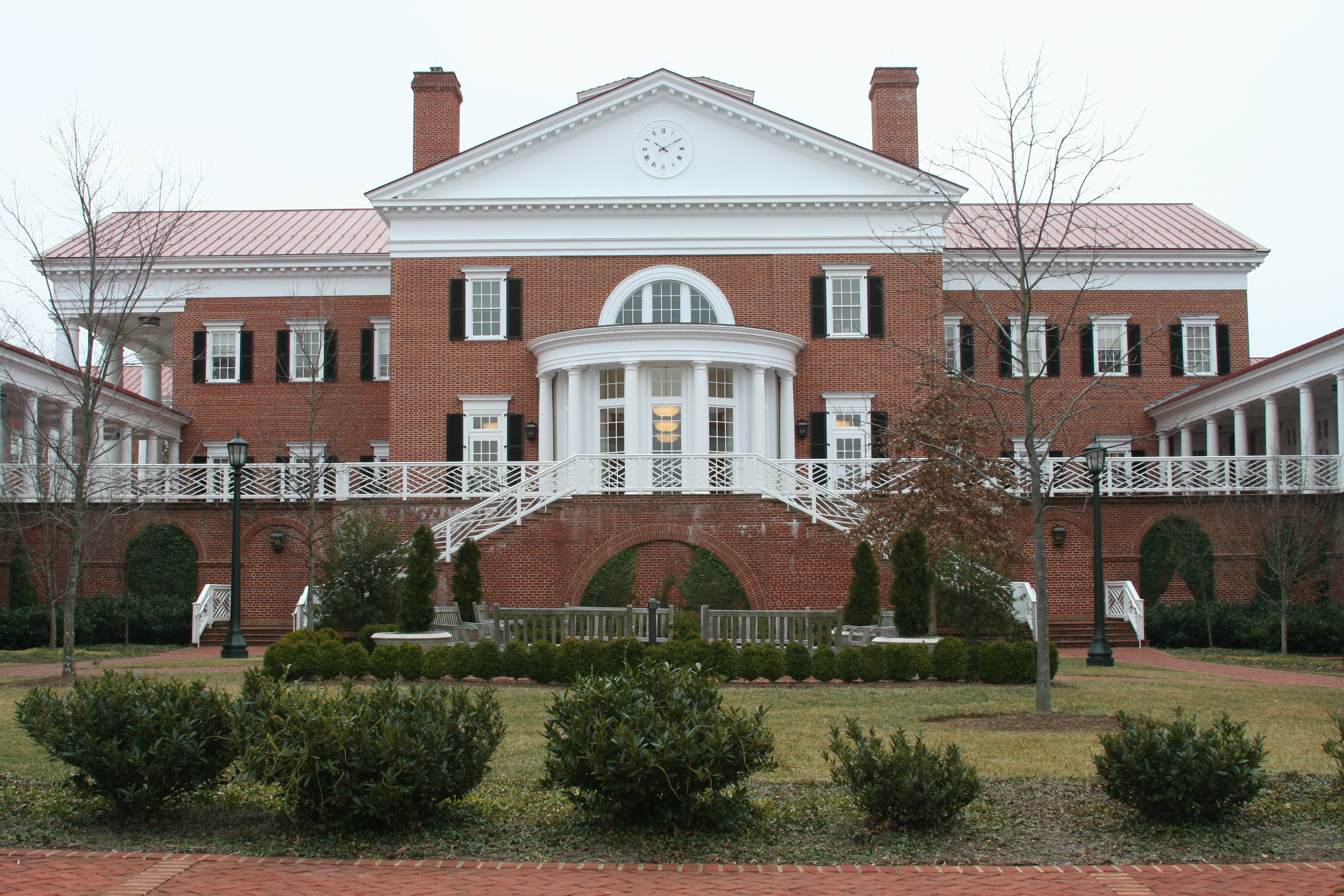
Darden main building, looked upon from the North

The Darden School was established on September 15, 1955, when it held its first classes. The school was a years–long effort by UVA President Colgate Darden. Initially, the school was known as the Graduate School of Business Administration and was located on the central grounds of UVA. On July 1, 1974, the school was renamed the Colgate Darden Graduate School of Business Administration and was moved to its current location at Saunders Hall in North Grounds in 1975. Designed by the Driehaus Prize winner Robert A. M. Stern, the Darden school's buildings feature sand-struck Virginia brick, Chippendale balustrades and red-metal standing seam roofs. In 2018, the Sands Family Grounds was inaugurated by the Darden School, in Arlington County, Virginia, in proximity to Washington D.C.'s central business district. The Sands Family Grounds occupy the top two floors of a 31-story skyscraper.

=== Deans ===
Number	Dean	Term
10	Yael Grushka-Cockayne	2026-
9	Scott C. Beardsley	2015–2025
8	Robert F. Bruner	2005-2015
7	Robert S. Harris	2001–2005
6	Edward Adams 'Ted' Snyder	1998–2001
5	Leo Ignatius Higdon, Jr.	1993–1997
4	John W. Rosenblum	Interim 1982–1983, 1983–1993
3	Robert W. Haigh	1980–1982
2	Charles Stewart Sheppard	1972–1980
1	Charles Cortez Abbott	1954–1972

== Locations ==
The full-time MBA program is located in Charlottesville, Virginia at the UVA Darden Goodwin Family Grounds, which is roughly two hours from Washington, D.C.

Darden Charlottesville location

In 2017, it was announced that Darden would establish dedicated facilities in Rosslyn, formerly introduced as the UVA Darden Sands Family Grounds in February 2019, as the new home base for the Executive MBA formats and new M.S. in Business Analytics degree launched with the McIntire School of Commerce.

== MBA ==
Designed for students who seek to strengthen their leadership, business and communication skills, Darden's two-year MBA program combines core and elective courses in Charlottesville, Virginia with opportunities for every student to study abroad.

=== Admissions ===
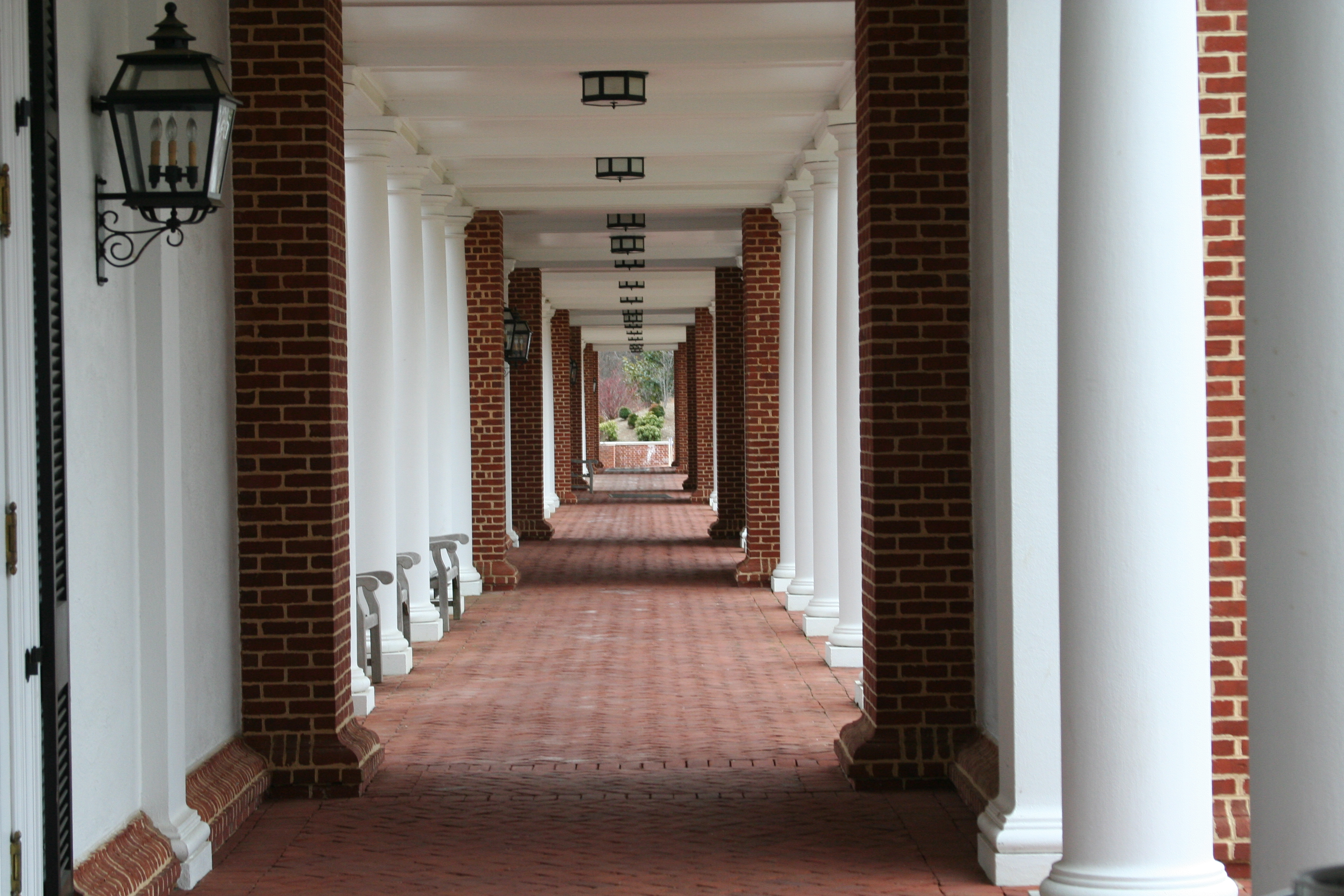
The Jeffersonian corridors along the School grounds

Admission requirements for the MBA include an earned four-year bachelor's degree from an accredited U.S. institution or the international equivalent, completion of application forms and essays, GMAT or GRE score, academic transcripts, two professional recommendations, and the payment of a fee. The MBA Class of 2023 has an average GMAT score of 716 and an average GPA of 3.51, and an average age of 27 years old. Of the 352 students enrolled, 41% are international students, 37% are women and 14% are domestic minority students. The School had an acceptance rate of 26% as of 2019.

=== Study abroad ===
Students are offered study abroad programs as well as Darden Worldwide Courses which offer international immersion courses which are funded by a $15 million gift from philanthropist and donor, Frank Batten.

== Executive MBA formats ==
Designed with a hybrid structure of online learning with in-person residences at the new UVA Darden Sands Family Grounds in the Washington, D.C., area, two formats of the MBA are offered which provide the same degree as the MBA. The EMBA (Executive MBA) is designed for working professionals and the GEMBA (Global Executive MBA) is an option that provides additional global residences compared to the EMBA. Both formats have the same core curriculum over a period of twenty-one months with all students entering in the same cohort each academic year. Global residencies include Brazil, Chile, China, Germany, Japan, Ghana, Israel, India, Estonia and Cuba with changes in locations possible each year.

== Darden Executive Education ==
The inaugural Executive Education program was offered in 1955. Darden Executive Education offers both short courses and custom solutions, as well as consortia, corporate university design and development, and industry specific partnerships. Short course focus areas include leadership, general management, strategy and decision-making, negotiation, growth and innovation, project management, sales and marketing, financial management and corporate aviation.

== Rankings ==
Business school rankings

United States
- QS MBA: 24
- Financial Times MBA: 9
- Bloomberg MBA: 5
- USNWR MBA: 11
- THE Business: 28

Global
- QS MBA: 62
- Financial Times MBA: 19
- THE Business: 64

Darden's current rankings are as follows:

=== MBA rankings ===
- #1 (U.S. public) Fortune 2026
- #7 (overall) Fortune 2026
- #9 (U.S.)Financial Times 2026
- #3 Bloomberg Businessweek 2023
- #10 U.S. News & World Report 2024
- #13 Forbes 2019

=== MBA Specialty rankings ===
- #1 Best Professors - The Princeton Review 2019
  - #2 Best MBA For Consulting - The Princeton Review 2019
  - #2 Best MBA For Management - The Princeton Review 2019
  - #4 Best Campus Environment - The Princeton Review 2019
  - #6 Entrepreneurship - The Princeton Review for Entrepreneur magazine 2019
- #1 Education Experience in United States - The Economist 2019
- #1 Corporate Social Responsibility - Financial Times 2019
- #1 General Management - Financial Times 2016
- #2 Learning - Bloomberg Businessweek 2019
- #11 Career Services Rank - Financial Times 2019

=== Executive Education rankings ===
- #1 Course Design (Global) - Financial Times 2016-2018
- #1 Faculty (Global) - Financial Times 2004-2011
- #7 Facilities (Global) - Financial Times 2019

== Notable alumni ==
Darden's list of alumni includes:

- Leslie M. Baker Jr. (MBA '69), former CEO of Wachovia
- John H. Bryan (MBA '60), CEO and chairman of Sara Lee from 1976 to 2001
- Eric Chewning (MBA '08), partner at McKinsey & Company; former chief of staff to the Secretary of Defense
- Robert Citrone (MBA '90) co-founder of Discovery Capital Management
- George David (MBA '67), CEO and chairman of United Technologies Corporation
- Helen Dragas, businesswoman; first woman to be rector for the University of Virginia Board of Visitors
- Jay Faison (MBA '95), founder of ClearPath Foundation
- Bill Hawkins (MBA '82), former president and CEO, Medtronic Inc.; CEO, Immucor Inc.
- Robert J. Hugin (MBA '85), CEO of Celgene Corporation
- Hal Lawton (MBA ‘00), President & CEO, Tractor Supply
- Doug Lebda (MBA '14), founder & CEO of LendingTree
- Carolyn Miles (MBA '88), former CEO of Save The Children
- Rania Nashar, Saudi businesswoman
- Thomas Neir (MBA '88), businessman; founder of Pacific Coffee Company
- Michael E. O'Neill (MBA '74), former chairman of Citigroup
- Chris Patrick (MBA '06), general manager of the Washington Capitals
- Lewis F. Payne, Jr. (MBA '73), former Virginia congressman
- J. Michael Pearson (MBA '84), former CEO of Valeant Pharmaceuticals International
- Steven Reinemund (MBA '78), former CEO and Chairman of PepsiCo
- Hugo F. Rodriguez (MBA '00), United States Ambassador to Nicaragua
- Mark Sanford (MBA '88), former Governor of South Carolina
- Thomas A. Saunders III (MBA '67), former Morgan Stanley partner and Wall Street innovator
- Marc Short (MBA '04), former chief of staff to Vice President Mike Pence
- John Strangfeld (MBA '77), chairman and CEO, Prudential Financial
- Mark B. Templeton (MBA '78), President and CEO, Citrix Systems Inc.
- Henri Termeer (MBA '73), former CEO of Genzyme
- Steven C. Voorhees (MBA '80), former CEO of WestRock
- Roger L. Werner (MBA '77), former CEO of ESPN

== See also ==
- List of United States business school rankings
- List of business schools in the United States
