= Scott C. Beardsley =

American-French academic

Scott Beardsley

President of the University of Virginia
- Incumbent
- Assumed office January 1, 2026
- Preceded by: Paul G. Mahoney (acting)

Personal details
- Born: 1962 or 1963 (age 63–64) Maine, U.S.
- Spouse: Claire Dufournet
- Children: 3
- Education: Tufts University (BS); Massachusetts Institute of Technology (MBA); University of Pennsylvania (EdD)

Scott C. Beardsley (born 1962 or 1963) is an American-French professor and academic administrator. He is the dean of the Darden School of Business at the University of Virginia, where he is also the Charles C. Abbott Professor of Business. On December 19, 2025, he was named the tenth president of the University of Virginia, a role he assumed on January 1, 2026.

== Early life ==
Beardsley was born in Maine and grew up in Vermont and Alaska. He is of British descent.

Beardsley graduated from Tufts University with a B.S. in electrical engineering. He subsequently earned an M.B.A. from the MIT Sloan School of Management, and an Ed.D. in higher education management from the University of Pennsylvania in 2015. As of 2024, he is completing a part-time master of studies in practical ethics (artificial intelligence) in the Department of Philosophy at Pembroke College, University of Oxford.

== Career ==
Beardsley worked for McKinsey & Company for twenty-six years. He joined their New York City office in 1989, and was transferred to their office in Brussels, Belgium, in 1991. He became a partner in 1995, and a senior partner in 2000. He served as McKinsey's head of talent development and co-founder of the McKinsey Academy.

Beardsley succeeded Robert Bruner as the dean of the Darden School of Business at the University of Virginia in August 2015. He is also the Charles C. Abbott professor of business at the school.

Beardsley is the former chair of the American Chamber of Commerce in Belgium.

== Personal life ==
Beardsley is married to Claire Dufournet, a native of Annecy, France. They have three sons. He is a dual US–French citizen.
