= Trol =

Trol or similar, may refer to:

- News from the Republic of Letters (TRoL), literary journal
- The Review of Litigation (TROL), University of Texas student magazine
- "T.R.O.L." (story), a 2009 Doctor Who comic story; see Tenth Doctor comic stories

== See also ==
- AK Trolls (Turkish: AK Trol), state-sponsored pro-AKP anonymous online political commentators in Turkey
- Troll (disambiguation)
