= Carolyn Miles =

American charity executive (born 1962)

Carolyn Speer Miles (born 1962) was the president and C.E.O. of Save the Children. Carolyn Miles is currently sitting 4 boards, Spoon, RICE, Bucknell, and Bayer.

== Personal life ==
Miles was born in 1962 in Canton, Connecticut, to Edison and Nancy Speer. She attended Bucknell University and received her bachelor's of science degree in Animal behavior. She attended University of Virginia Darden School of Business and received her MBA. She is married and has three children.

== Career ==
After graduating from Bucknell University, Miles chose not to pursue a career in her field. After joining a veterinary team post-college, she fainted during a surgical procedure and decided to rethink her career choice. Instead, she went to work in the sales department of a large chemical company, where she was responsible for sales in a large part of the Midwest. After working there, Miles decided to pursue a M.B.A. at the University of Virginia Darden School of Business, and majored in marketing. She then moved to New York and went to work for American Express. She moved to Hong Kong with her family as part of her work. Afterward, she worked with a classmate from Darden University, Tom Neir, to build a coffee chain in Asia named the Pacific Coffee Company. While there, she became interested in volunteer work and decided to do nonprofit work as soon as she returned to the United States, after witnessing poverty in Southeast Asia. Once she returned, she joined Save the Children as the Associate Vice President in 1988. In 2004, she became Executive Vice President and Chief Operating Officer. While as Chief Operating Officer, she doubled the number of children that Save The Children reaches, and greatly increased its budget. In 2011, she became the first female to lead the organization, as she became the first female President and CEO of Save the Children.

== Awards ==
In 2011, Miles received Bucknell University's Distinguished Citizen Award. In 2015, Miles was named one of the World's Greatest Leaders by Fortune magazine. In 2019, Miles was the first woman to receive the Jonathan Daniels Award from the Virginia Military Institute.
