= Douglas Laycock =

American law professor

- Born: Wood River, IL
- Education: Michigan State University (BA); University of Chicago Law School (JD)
- Occupation: University professor
- Spouse: Teresa A. Sullivan

Douglas Laycock is the Robert E. Scott Distinguished Professor of Law Emeritus at the University of Virginia, and the Alice McKean Young Regents Chair in Law Emeritus at the University of Texas. He is a leading scholar in the areas of religious liberty and the law of remedies. He is an elected fellow of the American Academy of Arts & Sciences.

== Education ==
Laycock received his bachelor's degree from Michigan State University in 1970 and his J.D. from the University of Chicago Law School in 1973.

== Academic career ==
Laycock began his academic career at the University of Chicago Law School in 1976, where he was appointed Assistant Professor of Law and was promoted to Professor of Law in 1980. Prior to entering academia, he served as a law clerk to Judge Walter Cummings of the United States Court of Appeals for the Seventh Circuit (1973–1974) and subsequently practiced law in Austin, Texas, where his work included complex civil litigation.

In 1981, Laycock joined the University of Texas School of Law as Professor of Law. During his tenure, he held several endowed professorships, including the Liddell, Sapp, Zivley, Brown & LaBoon Professorship of Banking, Financial, Commercial and Corporate Law (1983–1984), the Thomas Watt Gregory Professorship (1983–1984), the Fulbright & Jaworski Professorship (1984–1987), the A. Dalton Cross Professorship (1987–1988), and the Alice McKean Young Regents Chair in Law (1988–2006), taking emeritus status in 2006. He also served as Associate Dean for Academic Affairs (1985–1986) and Associate Dean for Research (1991–2006), where he supervised and supported faculty scholarship.

Laycock joined the University of Michigan Law School in 2006 as the Yale Kamisar Collegiate Professor of Law.

In 2010, he joined the University of Virginia School of Law as the Armistead M. Dobie Professor of Law and Horace W. Goldsmith Research Professor of Law. From 2011 to 2023 he held the Robert E. Scott Distinguished Professorship of Law and was also Professor of Religious Studies at the University of Virginia from 2010 to 2023. He served as Class of 1963 Research Professor in Honor of Graham C. Lilly and Peter W. Low during multiple terms between 2014 and 2023. Upon his retirement from full-time teaching in 2023, he was appointed Robert E. Scott Distinguished Professor of Law Emeritus.

Alongside his university appointments, Laycock has played a significant role in the American Law Institute (ALI). Elected as a member in 1983, he later served on the ALI Council (2001–2019), as Second Vice President (2008–2015), and First Vice President (2015–2019). He took emeritus status on the Council in 2019. Since 2019, he has served as Reporter for the Restatement (Third) of Torts: Remedies.

== Research and scholarly work ==
=== Religious liberty ===
Much of Laycock's scholarship has centered on the constitutional protection of religious liberty and the interpretation of the Religion Clauses of the First Amendment. His work examines the relationship between the Free Exercise Clause and the Establishment Clause, arguing that the two provisions operate together to prevent governmental interference in religious belief and practice, thus protecting freedom of conscience both for individuals and for religious organizations.

A recurring theme in his scholarship is the concept of substantive neutrality, which evaluates government action according to whether it encourages or discourages religious belief or practice. Laycock has argued that government should remain neutral toward religion by avoiding incentives that either promote or burden religious exercise. He has applied this framework to the major and longstanding issues of religious liberty, including religious exemptions from generally applicable laws, public funding of religious institutions, and government-sponsored religious expression.

Laycock has argued that meaningful protection of the Free Exercise Clause requires exemptions from regulation in some circumstances, since a right to hold religious beliefs without the ability to practice them protects only a small part of religious liberty.

At the same time, he has maintained that religious exemptions are not absolute and may be restricted when necessary to prevent significant harm to others or to serve other compelling governmental interests. His scholarship emphasizes that constitutional protections for religious liberty should be interpreted in light of both the text of the First Amendment and the historical purposes of the Religion Clauses.

Another aspect of Laycock's work concerns government funding of religious institutions. He has examined the historical development of Establishment Clause doctrine, arguing that the constitutional prohibition on establishing religion originally addressed direct governmental support for the religious functions of churches and for the clergy. He argues that when religious organizations operate schools, or provide social services or medical care, substantive neutrality requires that government support religious and secular providers of the same service on equal and nondiscriminatory terms. His publications have explored how changing forms of public funding have influenced debates over neutrality, religious liberty, and the relationship between government and religious organizations in modern constitutional law.

He also argues that government speech about religion should be entirely neutral. Government should not promote religion or oppose religion, and it should not erect religious displays such as crosses, Nativity scenes, or Ten Commandments monuments. But public schools and universities should be free to teach about religion, so long as they do not endorse religion in general or any particular religious belief.

In an early article, Laycock argued that there was, and should be, a right to church autonomy—a right of religious organizations to control their own internal affairs free of outside interference. He further argued that this right is distinct from the right to worship and the right to conscientious objection, and that internal church decisions do not have to be based on religious doctrine to be constitutionally protected.The Supreme Court adopted an important part of the right to church autonomy in Hosanna-Tabor Evangelical Lutheran Church and School v. Equal Employment Opportunity Commission, a case that Laycock argued. The Court later generalized the right to church autonomy in Our Lady of Guadalupe School v. Morrissey-Berru.

Much of Laycock’s career has been devoted to rolling back the effects of Employment Division v. Smith, a Supreme Court decision that greatly reduced constitutional protections for the free exercise of religion. In one of the first articles criticizing the decision, Laycock argued that the opinion was deeply ambiguous. Maybe it had eliminated nearly all protection for the exercise of religion, as many at the time feared. But those parts of the opinion had exceptions, and if the exceptions were taken seriously, substantial protection remained. The Court seemed to imply a requirement “that religion get something analogous to most-favored nation status,” with as much protection as any analogous secular activity. The Supreme Court eventually adopted this idea, and three Justices adopted the very phrase.

=== Religion and other civil liberties ===
Another major theme of Laycock's scholarship is the relationship between religious liberty and other constitutional rights. He has written that protections for religious exercise, freedom of speech, reproductive rights, and the rights of sexual minorities all concern matters central to personal identity and individual autonomy. His publications have examined legal conflicts arising between religious liberty and same-sex marriage, abortion, and anti-discrimination law, advocating legal frameworks intended to protect both religious freedom and these other civil liberties. He has also made these arguments to courts and legislatures.

=== Remedies ===
The other large body of Laycock’s work addresses the law of remedies. The central theme of Laycock’s work in remedies is that this tradition no longer makes any sense now that the separate courts have long been merged nearly everywhere. Based on a survey of a great many cases, he has argued that judges recite the preference for damages, but that they no longer believe it or act on it. Laycock says that courts should award the better remedy, whether damages or an injunction, in every case, and that this is what judges actually do. And he argues that it is generally better to prevent harm, if it is feasible to do so, than to let that harm happen and then make the wrongdoer pay damages to compensate.

Laycock is one of two Reporters—the people who do all the research and writing—for the Restatement (Third) of Torts: Remedies. A Restatement is a systematic survey of an area of law by the American Law Institute, a nonpartisan body of judges, law professors, and practicing lawyers. Restatements are highly influential, often cited by the courts. The Restatement (Third) of Torts: Remedies examines remedies for torts, which are civil wrongs other than breach of contract. It is more than 1300 pages in draft, and in 2026, it received final approval through the bicameral process—the Council and the Membership—of the American Law Institute.

Final publication is expected in 2027. The first two Restatements of Torts were finally approved in 1939 and 1977, respectively, so the Third can be expected to remain in use for many years.

=== Legal advocacy and public service ===
Laycock has served as lead counsel in six cases in the Supreme Court; he has filed friend of the court briefs in some three dozen other Supreme Court cases. And he has testified frequently in Congress. In 1990, in a case called Employent Division v. Smith, the Supreme Court greatly reduced the constitutional protection for the free exercise of religion.

He testified in support of the Religious Freedom Restoration Act (RFRA). RFRA was Congress’s first response to Smith. The Supreme Court held RFRA unconstitutional as applied to state and local governments, but RFRA continues to protect the right to practice one’s religion as against the federal government. After the Supreme Court’s decision, Laycock testified repeatedly in support of efforts to replace RFRA. The partial replacement that Congress eventually could agree on is the Religious Land Use and Institutionalized Persons Act (RLUIPA). On the Senate floor as the bill neared passage, in the course of thanking key supporters, Senator Edward Kennedy said that “Professor Douglas Laycock of the University of Texas played an indispensable role in this process.”

He testified in support of the Religious Liberty and Charitable Donation Protection Act, which protects churches (and other charities) from demands that they refund gifts from contributors who later file for bankruptcy. And he co-authored a letter that was reprinted in the Congressional Record and cited on the Senate floor in support of the Respect for Marriage Act. That Act protects same-sex marriages, whether or not the Supreme Court continues to protect them, and it protects religious institutions that decline to assist with same-sex weddings or marriages.

In the Supreme Court, he represented the church in Church of the Lukumi Babalu Aye, Inc. v. City of Hialeah. This was the Supreme Court’s first free exercise case after Smith. The decision showed that Smith had not eliminated all protection for the exercise of religion, as many had feared.

His next Supreme Court argument was City of Boerne v. Flores. This was the case on the constitutionality of the Religious Freedom Restoration Act, and he lost; the Court struck the Act down as it applied to the states.

In 2012, he represented the church in Hosanna-Tabor Evangelical Lutheran Church and School v. Equal Employment Opportunity Commission. This was the case that established “the ministerial exception”—a key component of the right to church autonomy. And in 2015, he represented a Muslim prisoner in Holt v. Hobbs, establishing the prisoner’s right to grow a short beard for religious reasons. The opinion reinvigorated the prison provisions of the Religious Land Use and Institutionalized Persons Act, which lower courts had been underenforcing.

He has also represented Establishment Clause plaintiffs. In 2000, he successfully represented Catholic and Mormon families objecting to school-sponsored prayer over the public address system at high school football games, in Santa Fe Independent School District v. Doe. And in 2014, he unsuccessfully represented plaintiffs objecting to government-sponsored prayer at city council meetings in Town of Greece v. Galloway.

Laycock has been widely recognized as a leader in each of his two fields—both remedies and religious liberty. Samuel Bray, Professor of Law at the University of Chicago, has said: “Doug Laycock is a titan in the field of remedies. He wrote the history of the field, the most widely used casebook, and the most important work of scholarship. He is a reporter for the Restatement (Third) of Torts: Remedies.

And Mark Storslee, Professor of Law at the University of North Carolina, has said: “Douglas Laycock is a giant in the field of religious liberty. As a scholar, Doug defined and created the current scholarly conversation, pushing beyond bare abstractions like ‘neutrality’ or ‘separation of church and state’ to an approach focused on the unity of the Religion Clauses and their protection of private religious choice. As an advocate, Doug has shaped the Court’s jurisprudence more than almost any living practitioner, guiding the Court as the lead counsel in cases concerning things like the autonomy of religious organizations, the scope of federal accommodation statutes, and the meaning of the Free Exercise Clause after Employment Division v. Smith.

== Publications ==
Laycock is the author of numerous books, casebooks, and law review articles on constitutional law, remedies, and religious liberty. His principal works include Modern American Remedies (now in its 6th edition), The Death of the Irreparable Injury Rule, and, with Anthony Picarello Jr. and Robin Fretwell Wilson, Same-Sex Marriage and Religious Liberty. His many writings on religious liberty have been collected in a five-volume edition under the general title Religious Liberty.

== Awards ==
- 2025–2026 – Honored with Festschrifts in Review of Litigation (Vol. 44, 2025) and the Journal of Law and Religion (Vol. 40, 2026), recognizing his contributions to remedies and religious liberty.
- 2023 – Received the Lifetime Scholarly Achievement Award from the Section on Remedies of the Association of American Law Schools.
- 2021 – Awarded an honorary Doctor of Laws (LL.D.) by Michigan State University.
- 2017 – Received the Friend of the Bill of Rights and Religious Liberty Award from the Center for Constitutional Studies at Utah Valley University.
- 2013 – Awarded the Roger and Madeleine Traynor Faculty Achievement Award, University of Virginia.
- 2012 – Received the International Religious Liberty Award from the J. Reuben Clark Society at Brigham Young University.
- 2009 – Received the National First Freedom Award from the Center for America's First Freedom.
- 2005 – Awarded the Civitatis Award by the University of Texas at Austin for distinguished service to the university.
- 2000 – Named Civil Libertarian of the Year by the American Civil Liberties Union of Texas.
- 1997 – Elected a Fellow of the American Academy of Arts and Sciences.
- 1995 – Received the Civil Libertarian of the Year Award from the Central Texas Chapter of the American Civil Liberties Union.
- 1991 – Received the Scribes Book Award for The Death of the Irreparable Injury Rule.

== Personal life ==
He is married to Teresa A. Sullivan, who served as the first female president of the University of Virginia from 2010 to 2018.

== Bibliography ==
=== Books ===
- Laycock, Douglas. (1991). The Death of the Irreparable Injury Rule. Oxford University Press.
- Laycock, Douglas, Picarello, Anthony M., Jr., & Wilson, Robin Fretwell (Eds.). (2008). Same-Sex Marriage and Religious Liberty: Emerging Conflicts. Rowman & Littlefield.
- Laycock, Douglas. (2010). Religious Liberty: Volume One—Overviews and History. Wm. B. Eerdmans Publishing.
- Laycock, Douglas. (2011). Religious Liberty: Volume Two—The Free Exercise Clause. Wm. B. Eerdmans Publishing.
- Laycock, Douglas. (2018). Religious Liberty: Volume Three—Religious Freedom Restoration Acts, Same-Sex Marriage Legislation, and the Culture Wars. Wm. B. Eerdmans Publishing.
- Laycock, Douglas. (2018). Religious Liberty: Volume Four—Federal Legislation After the Religious Freedom Restoration Act, with More on the Culture Wars. Wm. B. Eerdmans Publishing.
- Laycock, Douglas. (2018). Religious Liberty: Volume Five—The Free Speech and Establishment Clauses. Wm. B. Eerdmans Publishing.
- Laycock, Douglas & Hasen, Richard L. (2025). Modern American Remedies: Cases and Materials (6th ed.). Aspen Publishing.
- American Law Institute (Laycock, Douglas & Hasen Richard L., Reporters), Restatement (Third) of Torts: Remedies (forthcoming 2027).

=== Journals ===
- Laycock, Douglas. (1977). Federal Interference with State Prosecutions: The Need for Prospective Relief. Supreme Court Review, 1977, 193-238.
- Brilmayer, Lea, Hekeler, Richard W., Laycock, Douglas, & Sullivan, Teresa. (1980). Sex Discrimination in Employer-Sponsored Insurance Plans: A Legal and Demographic Analysis. University of Chicago Law Review, 47, 505-560.
- Laycock, Douglas. (1981). Towards a General Theory of the Religion Clauses: The Case of Church Labor Relations and the Right to Church Autonomy. Columbia Law Review, 81, 1373-1417.
- Laycock, Douglas. (1986). Equal Access and Moments of Silence: The Equal Status of Religious Speech by Private Speakers. Northwestern University Law Review, 1986, 1-67.
- Laycock, Douglas (1990). The Death of the Irreparable Injury Rule. Harvard Law Review, 103(4), 687–732.
- Laycock, Douglas. (1990). Formal, Substantive, and Disaggregated Neutrality Toward Religion. DePaul Law Review, 39, 993-1018
- Laycock, Douglas. (1990). The Remnants of Free Exercise. Supreme Court Review, 1990, 1-68.
- Laycock, Douglas. (1992). Equal Citizens of Equal and Territorial States: The Constitutional Foundations of Choice of Law. Columbia Law Review 92, 249-336.
- Laycock, Douglas. (2004). Theology Scholarships, The Pledge of Allegiance, and Religious Liberty: Avoiding the Extremes but Missing the Liberty. Harvard Law Review, 118, 156-246.
- Laycock, Douglas. 2004. The Broader Case for Affirmative Action: Desegregation, Academic Excellence, and Future Leadership. Tulane Law Review 78, 1767-1841.
- Laycock, Douglas. (2006). Regulatory Exemptions of Religious Behavior and the Original Understanding of the Establishment Clause. Notre Dame Law Review, 81, 1793–1814.
- Laycock, Douglas. How Remedies Became a Field: A History. Review of Litigation, 27, 161-267 (2008).
- Laycock, Douglas. (2011). Government-Sponsored Religious Displays: Transparent Rationalizations and Expedient Post-Modernism, Case Western Reserve Law Review, 61, 1211-1252.
- Laycock, Douglas. (2014). Religious Liberty and the Culture Wars. University of Illinois Law Review, 2014, 839–880.
- Laycock, Douglas, & Collis, Steven T. (2016). Generally Applicable Law and the Free Exercise of Religion. Nebraska Law Review, 95, 1–54.
