= Earl Louis Stewart =

American composer

Earl Louis Stewart, DMA
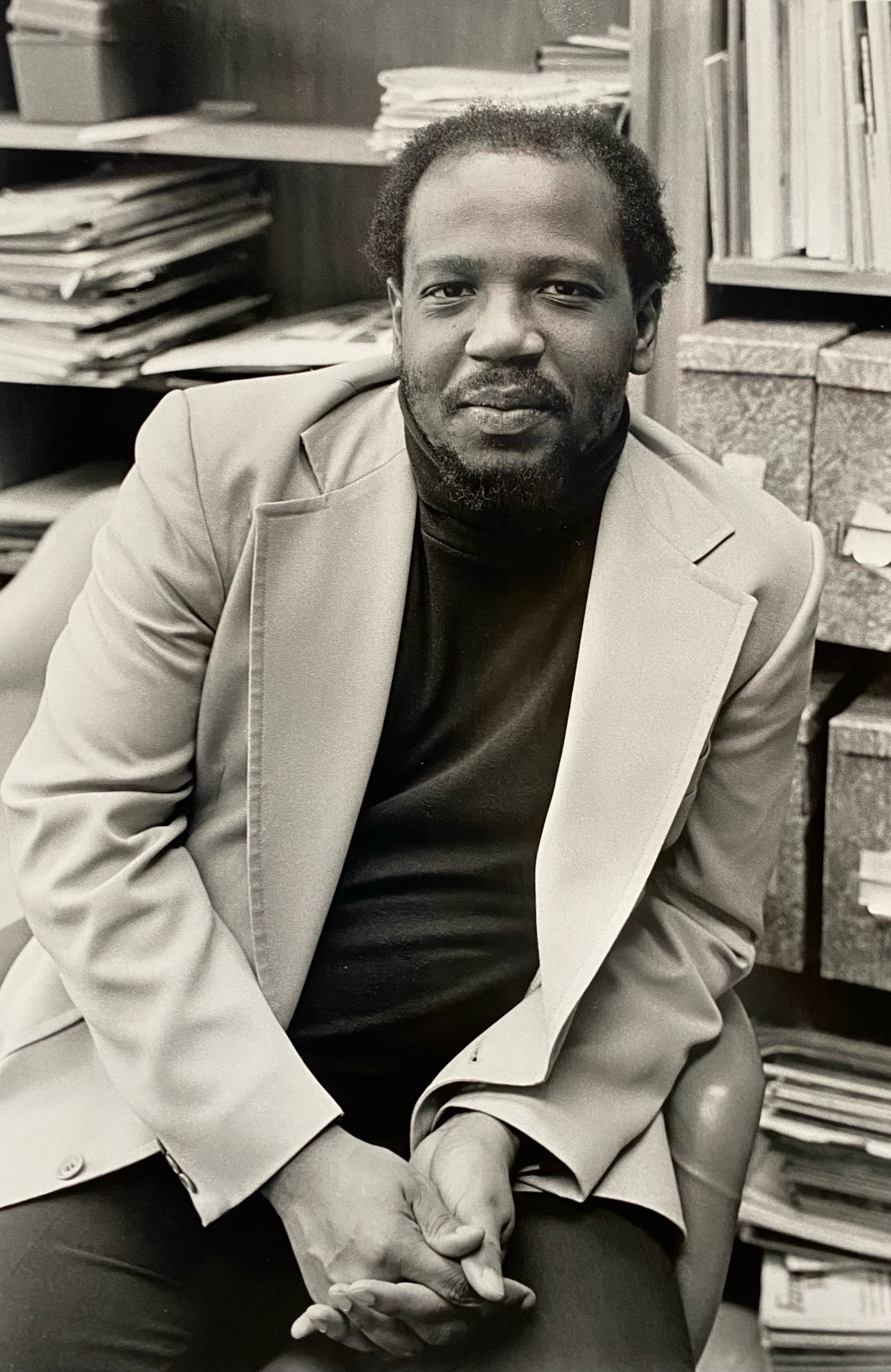
- Born: August 11, 1950 (age 76); Baton Rouge, Louisiana
- Education: University of Texas at Austin
- Occupations: American composer; musicologist; author; professor emeritus
- Awards: Global Music Awards (2018, 2022)
- Website: Official Site

Earl Louis Stewart (born August 11, 1950) is an author, essayist, poet, professor emeritus of The College of Creative Studies and the Black Studies department at the University of California Santa Barbara and an American composer of intellectual jazz as represented by the American Composer's Alliance. In the past fifty years, Stewart has written several hundred compositions for chamber ensembles, chamber orchestras, symphony orchestras, quartets, soloists, and choir.

== Biography ==
Stewart's career began at age fourteen when writing head arrangements with pick-up bands headlined by visiting black-soul artists from across the United States, and performing as a trumpeter with notables like Percy Sledge, Syl Johnson, King Floyd, Garland Green amongst others traveling on the Chitlin' Circuit.

Following the development of his experience as a jazz musician, Stewart attended Southern University Baton Rouge's Jazz Institute, studying jazz composition under Alvin Batiste, an American jazz clarinetist, as preparation for him to earn his doctorate at the University of Texas in Austin. Stewart studied Western-European-classical-music composition with composer Karl Korte, orchestrator and author Kent Kennan, ethnomusicologist Gerard Béhague, and Pulitzer-Prize-winning composer Joseph Schwantner.

Stewart's compositions have been performed at venues worldwide, such as the Weill Recital Hall at Carnegie Hall and the Brooklyn Conservatory of Music in New York; Heineken Jazz Festival in Tel Aviv, Israel; Saenger Theatre in Mobile, Alabama; the Sixth Annual Biennial International and Symposium Festival on New Intercultural Music at the University of London. Notables who have performed select pieces of Stewart's compositions include saxophonist Cannonball Adderley, Alvin Batiste, actor Moses Gunn, choreographer Chuck Davis, and mezzo-soprano Barbara Conrad.

Stewart has authored three books on music, including African American Music: An Introduction, a comprehensive study of African American music spanning from the Civil War to the present. He has also written numerous articles examining African-American music's aesthetic and theoretical significance. Stewart's publications include "African-American Music" in the Encyclopedia of Multiculturalism "Towards an Aesthetic of Black Musical Expression" in the Journal of Aesthetic Education, "Pan-African Classicism and Scott Joplin" in the Texas Journal, "Otis Redding" in Popular Musicians, and "Coleridge-Taylor: Concatenationalism and Essentialism in an Anglo-African Composer" in the American Philosophical Association Newsletter of Philosophy and the Black Experience.

In December 2003, Stewart contracted Guillain–Barré syndrome, an autoimmune disease, of which the symptoms caused him to end his career as a conductor.

== Select compositions ==
=== Chamber ensemble ===
- Rhythm Sonata No. 1-13 (2006–2021) for flute, drum set, harp, and strings
- Baching the Blues (2007) for flute and harp
- Bop'n the Rag Blues (2022) for flute and piano
- Blues Invention (2007) for flute and harp
- Inventions Sacred and Profane (2007) for vibraphone and violoncello
- Rag and Fugue (2003) for violin, violoncello, and double bass
- Three Rags for Flute and Piano (2018) for flute and piano

=== Chamber orchestra ===
- The Portal (2016)
- Elton's Nocturne (2000)
- Corsica (2007)
- Corsica (2007)
- Nakupenda - Identity 19.2 (1989) on YouTube
- Undulations (1986)
- Vicissitudes of Life (2007)
- Amazing Grace (1997)
- Katrina Lament - Identity 113 (2006) on YouTube
- Elegy for Mr. Alvin Batiste (2007) on YouTube
- Canonic Swings Vol 1-7 (2020–2023)
- Budding Rose Rag (2020)
- Dark Beauty (2007)
- Journey to the Seat of the Master (1999)
- The Beautiful Pearl Ragtime (2009)
- Friends Forever (2009)
- The Dawning of Spring (1990)
- Three Rag Offerings (2008)
- Trip of Love Fantasy (1988)
- Jazz Fugue for Flute and Strings (1989)
- Undulations (1986) on YouTube
- Asante Sana Sana on YouTube

=== Symphony orchestra ===
- Glimpses (1981)
- Diminished Fantasy (2011)
- Trip of Love (1988)
- Swing for Violin & Orchestra (2009)
- Double Fugue on a Theme by Duke Ellington (2021)
- Vernacular Variations (1998)
- Blues Prelude and Fugue (2020)

=== Jazz symphony ===
- Symphony
  - No. 1 F minor
  - No. 2 E minor
  - No. 3 D minor
  - No. 4: Juneteenth
  - No. 5 Homage to Swing on Vimeo
  - No. 6 Ragtimes Vol I&II
  - No. 8 Echoes from a Simpler Time
  - No. 9 Five Musicals Prayers
  - No. 15 New Beginning
  - Jazz Passacaglia (2021)

=== Piano works ===
- Afro-Inventions for Piano: Volume I, II (1993)
- Song for Annell - A Blues Fantasy (1982) for piano on YouTube
- Tangulizi Kabala Ya Nisha Kuu: Preludes before dissertations (1981)
- Afro Fugues in 3 Parts (2012)
- Classic Rags Book 1 (2003)

=== Piano rags ===
- 4 Canonic Rags
- Beauty in Darkness Rag

=== Oratorio / cantata ===
- Al-Inkishafi (1984)
- Chrismons-Jazz Cantata

== Selected performances ==
Steal Away (1991)

- For soprano soloist, chorus, and orchestra
- Premiered by the Boston Orchestra and Chorale

Al-Inkishafi: An Oratorio (1984)

- Performed by the Austin Symphony Orchestra at the Grand Concert Hall of University of Texas Performing Arts Center
- Featuring Barbara Conrad, Moses Gunn as narrator, and choreographer Chuck Davis, conducted by Maestro Sung Kwak.

Deep River (December 1987)

- Performed by the Scott Joplin Chamber Orchestra of Houston, Texas.

Concerto: An Appropriate Title (1975)

- Premiered April 1975 at the 2nd Annual Louisiana Composers Symposium
- Performed by Julian 'Cannonball" Adderley, soprano saxophone

Symphony No. 4: Juneteenth (2024).

- For chamber orchestra
- Premiered June 2024 at the first annual Prelude to Juneteenth celebration at the University of California Los Angeles, Royce Hall
- Conducted by Maestro Antoine Clark

Amina (1990)

- For voice and piano
- Performed by Carolyn Sebron at Weill Recital Hall at Carnegie Hall, New York

American Independence Suite (1992)

- Performed by the National Symphony Orchestra of Ghana; sponsored by AT&T, and the American Embassy of Ghana in Accra, Ghana

Nakupenda (1999)

- For chamber orchestra
- Performed by Kent Jordan at the Heineken Jazz Festival in Tel Aviv, Israel

Tenderly (2002)

- For chamber orchestra
- Featuring Kent Jordan, performed by the Santa Barbara Symphony Orchestra at the Corwin Pavilion, University of California Santa Barbara

== Bibliography ==
=== Books ===
- African American Music: An Introduction, New York: Cengage Learning (formerly Schirmer Books; London: Prentice Hall International), 1998. ISBN 9780028602943
- The Art of Soul Music: 1960-1980. A Musicological Perspective (Preliminary Edition) Kendall/Hunt Publishing Company, Dubuque, IA, 2012. ISBN 978-0-7575-9999-6
- Vernacular Harmony: San Diego, CA: University Readers, an imprint of Cognella, 2010 ISBN 978-1-60927-783-3
- Eclectic Fables: Seven Tales from the Black Experience, Bloomington, IN: AuthorHouse (formerly known as 1st Books Library, San Bernardino, CA), 2002 ISBN 978-1-40331-940-1

=== Articles ===
- "Pan-African Classicism and Scott Joplin," Texas Journal, Vol. 4, No. 1, pp 12–15, Fall/Winter 1991. Print.*
- "The Black Rhythmic Conception," Uhuru, Vol. 4, No. 2, pp 68 –69, Ghana, West Africa 1992. Print.
- "A Case For The NSO," Uhuru, Vol. 5, No. 6, pp 43–45, Ghana, West Africa 1993. Print.
- "African-American Music," Encyclopedia of Multiculturalism, pp 1199–1203, Salem Press, Pasadena, California 1993. Print.
- "Celebrating Black History Month," Progressions (newsletter), pp 1–2, Berklee College of Music, Winter 1993. Print.
- "From the Lone Star to the Black Star," Berklee Today: A Forum for Contemporary Music and Musicians, pp 8, Berklee College of Music, Spring 1993. Print.
- Duran, Jane and Earl Stewart, "Toward an Aesthetic of Black Musical Expression," Journal of Aesthetic Education, Vol. 31, No. 1, University of Illinois, Spring 1997. JSTOR 3333473
- Duran, Jane and Earl Stewart. "Form and Nigrecence in African and Afro-North American Arts," Art & Academe, Vol. 9, No. 1, Visual Arts Press, Summer 1997. Print.
- "Otis Redding," Popular Musicians, pp 890–892, Salem Press, Inc., April 1999. Print.
- Stewart, Earl and Jane Duran. "Black Essentialism: The Art of Jazz Rap," Philosophy of Music Education Review," Volume 7, No. 1, Spring 1999. Print. www.iupress.indiana.edu/journals/pmer/pmetoc7.html
- Stewart, Earl and Jane Duran. "Coleridge-Taylor: Concatenationism and Essentialism in an Anglo-African Composer," American Philosophical Association Newsletter, Vol. 99, No. 1, Fall 1999. www.apa.udel.edu/apa/publications/newsletters/v99n1/blackexperience/article-stewart.asp
- Harris, Leonard, editor, Jane Duran, and Earl Stewart, contributors. The Critical Pragmatism of Alain Locke: A Reader on Value Theory, Aesthetics, Community, Culture, Race, and Education, Rowman & Littlefield Publishers, Inc., 1999. www.rowmanlittlefield.com/Catalog/SingleBook.shtmlcommand=Search&db=%5EDB/CATALOG.db&eqSKUdata=0847688089&thepassedurl=%5Bthepassedurl%5D
- Duran, Jane and Earl Stewart. "Scott Joplin and the Quest for Identity," Journal of Aesthetic Education, Vol. 41, No. 2, pp. 94–99, Summer 2007. Print.

== Discography ==
=== Studio Albums ===
From the Heart: The Music of Earl Louis Stewart (2007)

- Eclectic String Studio Orchestra, Molly Buzick, conductor
  - Inkishafi Records and Publishing: CD Baby / Inkishafi 4004

Homage by Marcus Eley: Majestic (2024)

- Marcus Eley, Clarinet, Earl Lous Stewart, composer
  - Navona Records and Publishing

Rhythm of the Spirit: Vol I (2025)

- Earl Lous Stewart, composer
  - Navona Records and Publishing

=== DVD ===
- Eclectic Musings: 3rd Annual Nakupenda Valentine's Concert (2006)
  - Piano Compositions, Poetry, and Short Stories, Earl Stewart, music director
  - Regents of the University of California UCTV 4315
- Bach in the Hood: 4th Annual Nakupenda Concert (2008)
  - Eclectic String Studio Orchestra, Earl Stewart, composer
  - UC Santa Barbara Department of Music, Center for Black Studies, College of Creative Studies
  - Regents of the University of California UCTV 15115
