= University of Texas at Austin School of Law =

Graduate school in Austin, Texas, US

- Parent school: University of Texas at Austin
- Established: 1883; 143 years ago
- School type: Public law school
- Endowment: $314.8 million (2024)
- Dean: Bobby Chesney
- Location: Austin, Texas, United States; 30.288666°N 97.730762°W
- Enrollment: 985 (2024)
- Faculty: 311 (2023)
- USNWR ranking: 14th (tied) (2025)
- Bar pass rate: 96.39% (2025)
- Website: law.utexas.edu

The University of Texas at Austin School of Law (Texas Law) is the law school of the University of Texas at Austin, a public research university in Austin, Texas.

== History ==
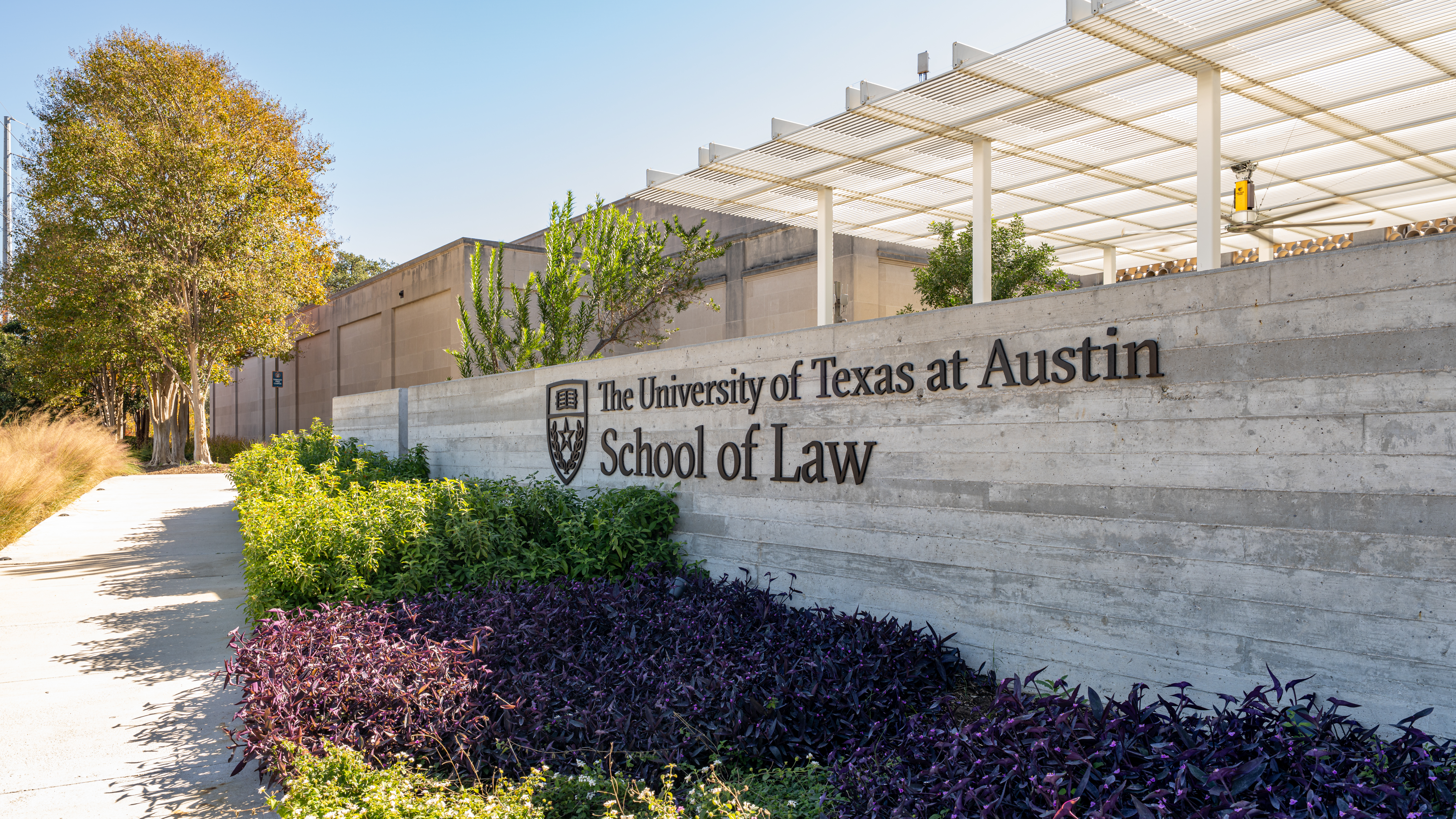
The University of Texas School of Law (2025)

The University of Texas School of Law was founded in 1883. The School of Law began as The University of Texas at Austin’s Department of Law when the university was founded in 1883.

Prior to the Civil Rights Movement, the school was limited to white students, but the school's admissions policies were challenged from two different directions in high-profile 20th century federal court cases that were important to the long struggle over segregation, integration, and diversity in American education.

=== Sweatt v. Painter (1950) ===
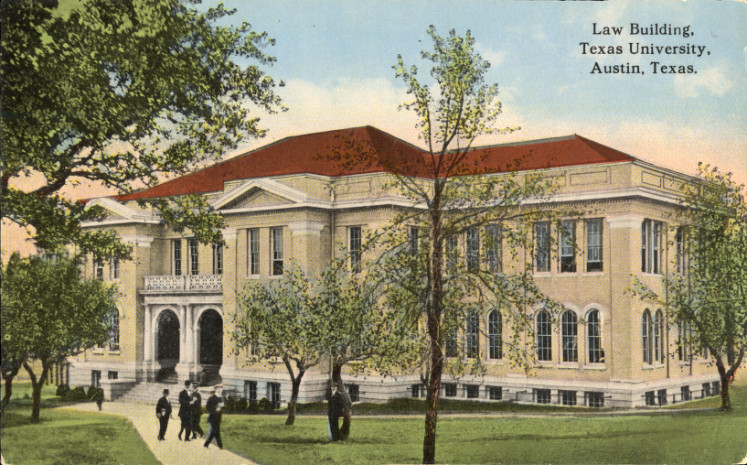
Illustration of the Law Building on a postcard (1908–1924).

The school was sued in the civil rights case of Sweatt v. Painter (1950). The case involved Heman Marion Sweatt, a black man who was refused admission to the school on the grounds that substantially equivalent facilities (meeting the requirements of Plessy v. Ferguson) were offered by the state's law school for blacks. When the plaintiff first applied to the University of Texas, there was no law school in Texas which admitted blacks. Instead of granting the plaintiff a writ of mandamus, the Texas trial court "continued" the case for six months to allow the state time to create a law school for blacks, which it developed in Houston.

The Supreme Court reversed the lower court decision, saying that the separate school failed to offer Sweatt an equal legal education. The court noted that the University of Texas School of Law had 16 full-time and three part-time professors, 850 students and a law library of 65,000 volumes, while the separate school the state set up for blacks had five full-time professors, 23 students and a library of 16,500 volumes. But the court held that even "more important" than these quantitative differences were differences such as "reputation of the faculty, experience of the administration, position and influence of the alumni, standing in the community, traditions and prestige". Because the separate school could not provide an "equal" education, the court ordered that Hemann Sweatt be admitted to University of Texas School of Law.

Sweatt v. Painter was the first major test case in the long-term litigation strategy of Thurgood Marshall and the NAACP Legal Defense Fund that led to the landmark Supreme Court decision in the case of Brown v. Board of Education in 1954. Marshall and the NAACP correctly calculated that they could dismantle segregation by building up a series of precedents, beginning at Texas Law, before moving on to the more explosive question of racial integration in elementary schools.

In 1953, Virgil C. Lott became the first African American to graduate from Texas Law, and in the following year, Gloria Bradford became the first African-American woman to graduate from the institution.

=== Hopwood v. Texas (1996) ===
In 1992, plaintiff Cheryl Hopwood, a White American woman, sued the school on the grounds that she had not been admitted even though her grades and test scores were better than those of some minority candidates who were admitted pursuant to an affirmative action program. Texas Monthly editor Paul Burka later described Hopwood as "the perfect plaintiff to question the fairness of reverse discrimination" because of her academic credentials and personal hardships which she had endured (including a young daughter suffering from a muscular disease).

With her attorney Steven Wayne Smith, later a two-year member of the Texas Supreme Court, Hopwood won her case, Hopwood v. Texas, in the United States Court of Appeals for the Fifth Circuit, which ruled that the school "may not use race as a factor in deciding which applicants to admit in order to achieve a diverse student body, to combat the perceived effects of a hostile environment at the law school, to alleviate the law school's poor reputation in the minority community, or to eliminate any present effects of past discrimination by actors other than the law school". The case did not reach the Supreme Court.

However, the Supreme Court ruled in Grutter v. Bollinger (2003), a case involving the University of Michigan, that the United States Constitution "does not prohibit the law school's narrowly tailored use of race in admissions decisions to further a compelling interest in obtaining the educational benefits that flow from a diverse student body". This effectively reversed the decision of Hopwood v. Texas.

== Academics ==
=== Admissions ===
Texas Law is among the more selective law schools in the nation. For the 2023-2024 admissions cycle, 5,475 students applied and 854 (15.60%) were accepted. Of accepted students, 269 (31.50%) enrolled. The enrolled class has a class median LSAT score of 171. The median GPA for the enrolled class is 3.89. Women make up 48% of the class, and 41% of the class identify as minority students. The average age of the class was 24. Texas Law enrolled students from 34 US states—including D.C. Emphasizing its role as a public institution, Texas Law is required by the state legislature to reserve 65% of the seats in each first-year class for Texas residents.

=== Rankings ===
In 2025, The U.S. News & World Report rankings ranked Texas Law as tied for the 14th best law school in the nation.

=== Publications ===
Students at the University of Texas School of Law publish ten law journals:

- American Journal of Criminal Law
- Texas Environmental Law Journal
- Texas Hispanic Journal of Law and Policy
- Texas Intellectual Property Law Journal
- Texas International Law Journal
- Texas Journal of Oil, Gas & Energy Law
- Texas Journal on Civil Liberties & Civil Rights
- Texas Law Review
- Texas Review of Law and Politics
- The Review of Litigation

=== Costs ===
The total cost of attendance for incoming students (indicating the cost of tuition, fees, and living expenses) at Texas Law for the 2024-2025 academic year is $63,410 for residents and $81,996 for non-residents. In 2024, 93.3% of all students were receiving grants and scholarships. The scholarship quartiles were $10,000, $21,984, and $35,667 for the 25th, 50th (median), and 75th percentiles respectively. 8.1% of all students were receiving full tuition or more than full tuition. Additionally, the University of Texas School of Law does not award conditional scholarships. Conditional scholarship are any scholarships that may be reduced or eliminated based on law school academic performance other than failure to maintain good academic standing.

== Programs ==
Texa Law is home to six award-winning academic programs.

- Advocacy Program
- AI Innovation and Law Program
- Law and Business Program
- Law and Philosophy Program
- Private Law Theory Program
- Richard and Ginni Mithoff Pro Bono Program

== Notable Centers ==
=== Center for Human Rights and Justice ===
The Bernard and Audre Rapoport Center for Human Rights and Justice serves as a focal point for critical, interdisciplinary analysis and practice of human rights and social justice. The Rapoport Center was founded in 2004 by Professor Karen Engle, Minerva House Drysdale Regents Chair in Law, thanks to a donation from the Bernard and Audre Rapoport Foundation to the University of Texas School of Law. The Rapoport Foundation was founded in 1986 by Bernard Rapoport and his wife Audre. In 2010, Daniel Brinks, Associate Professor of Government at the University of Texas at Austin, became co-director of the Center. The Center has over one hundred affiliated faculty members from various schools and departments within the University of Texas at Austin.

In February 2013, the Rapoport Center received a three-year, $150,000 grant from the Creekmore and Adele Fath Charitable Foundation to highlight the life and career of Sissy Farenthold, an American Democratic politician, activist, lawyer and educator, perhaps best known for her run for Texas Governor and for her nomination for Vice President in the 1972 Democratic National Convention. The project documents Farenthold's contributions to Texas and U.S. politics, the women's peace movement, and international human rights and justice. The Rapoport Center will work with the Dolph Briscoe Center for American History (where Farenthold's papers are housed) in order to process and preserve Farenthold's papers, digitize archival documents and images, produce videotaped interviews, and expand the content of the Rapoport Center's website.

=== Center for Women in Law ===
In 2008 the law school announced the creation of the Center for Women in Law, "To eliminate the barriers that have thwarted the advancement of women in the legal profession for the past several decades, and thereby enhance the legal profession and its ability to serve an increasingly diverse and globally connected society."

== Outcome ==
=== Employment ===
Texas has maintained strong employment outcomes for its graduates relative to other law schools. According to Texas Law official 2024 ABA-required disclosures, 93.0% of the Class of 2024 obtained full-time, long-term bar passage required employment (i.e. as attorneys) nine months after graduation. Texas Law had an overall employment rate of 98.80%. UT's Law School Transparency under-employment score is 3.6%, indicating the percentage of the Class of 2024 unemployed, pursuing an additional degree, or working in a non-professional, short-term, or part-time job nine months after graduation.

=== Bar Passage Rate ===
In 2025, UT Law reported first time bar passage rates as 96.52% for the class of 2024, 94.01% for the class of 2023, and 90.39 for the class of 2022. For the class of 2024, students had a bar passage rate of 95.57% for Texas, 100% for the District of Columbia, 96.43% for New York, 83.33% for California, and 100% for the remaining jurisdictions.

== Notable people ==
=== Alumni ===
In 2017, the school had 19,000 living alumni. Amongst its alumni are former U.S. Supreme Court Justice and U.S. Attorney General Tom C. Clark; former U.S. Secretary of State James A. Baker; former U.S. Secretary of Treasury Lloyd Bentsen; former White House senior advisor Paul Begala; former Speaker of the U.S. House of Representatives Sam Rayburn; former litigator Sarah Weddington who represented Jane Roe in the landmark case Roe v Wade; prominent Supreme Court advocate Lisa Blatt; and Wallace B. Jefferson, the first African American Chief Justice of the Texas Supreme Court.

=== Faculty ===
==== Current faculty ====
- Philip Bobbitt – Previously the A.W. Walker Centennial Chair at the University of Texas
- Robert M. Chesney – Dean & Honorable James A. Baker III Chair in the Rule of Law and World Affairs, co-founder of Lawfare blog
- Karen Engle - Minerva House Drysdale Regents Chair in Law and the Founder and Co-director of the Bernard and Audre Rapoport Center for Human Rights and Justice
- Ward Farnsworth – W. Page Keeton Chair in Tort Law
- Douglas Laycock – Robert E. Scott Distinguished Professor
- Sanford Levinson – W. St. John Garwood and W. St. John Garwood, Jr. Centennial Chair
- Lawrence G. Sager – Former dean of University of Texas School of Law and the Alice Jane Drysdale Sheffield Regents Chair
- Abraham Wickelgren - Fred and Emily Marshall Wulff Centennial Chair in Law

==== Former faculty ====
- Jack Balkin – Knight Professor of Constitutional Law and the First Amendment at Yale Law School
- Mitchell N. Berman – Professor of Law at the University of Pennsylvania Law School
- Ted Cruz – U.S. Senator and former Presidential Candidate; adjunct professor of Constitutional Law
- Julius Getman – Professor and activist in Labor and Employment law
- Lino Graglia – Dalton Cross Professor of Law at the University of Texas School of Law
- Leon A. Green – American legal realist and dean of Northwestern University School of Law (1929–1947)
- W. Page Keeton – Attorney and dean of the University of Texas School of Law for a quarter century
- Brian Leiter – Karl N. Llewellyn Professor of Jurisprudence at the University of Chicago Law School
- Basil Markesinis – former Jamail Regents Professor in Law
- William Powers, Jr. – Former dean of University of Texas School of Law and former President of the University of Texas at Austin
- Stephen Vladeck – Agnes Williams Sesquicentennial Professor of Federal Courts, Georgetown Law
- Elizabeth Warren – U.S. Senator and presidential candidate
- Charles Alan Wright – American constitutional lawyer and coauthor of the 54-volume treatise, Federal Practice and Procedure
- Mark Yudof – Long-serving faculty member who later became president of the University of California System, chancellor of the University of Texas System, and president of the University of Minnesota
