= Jay Faison =

Founder and CEO of SnapAV

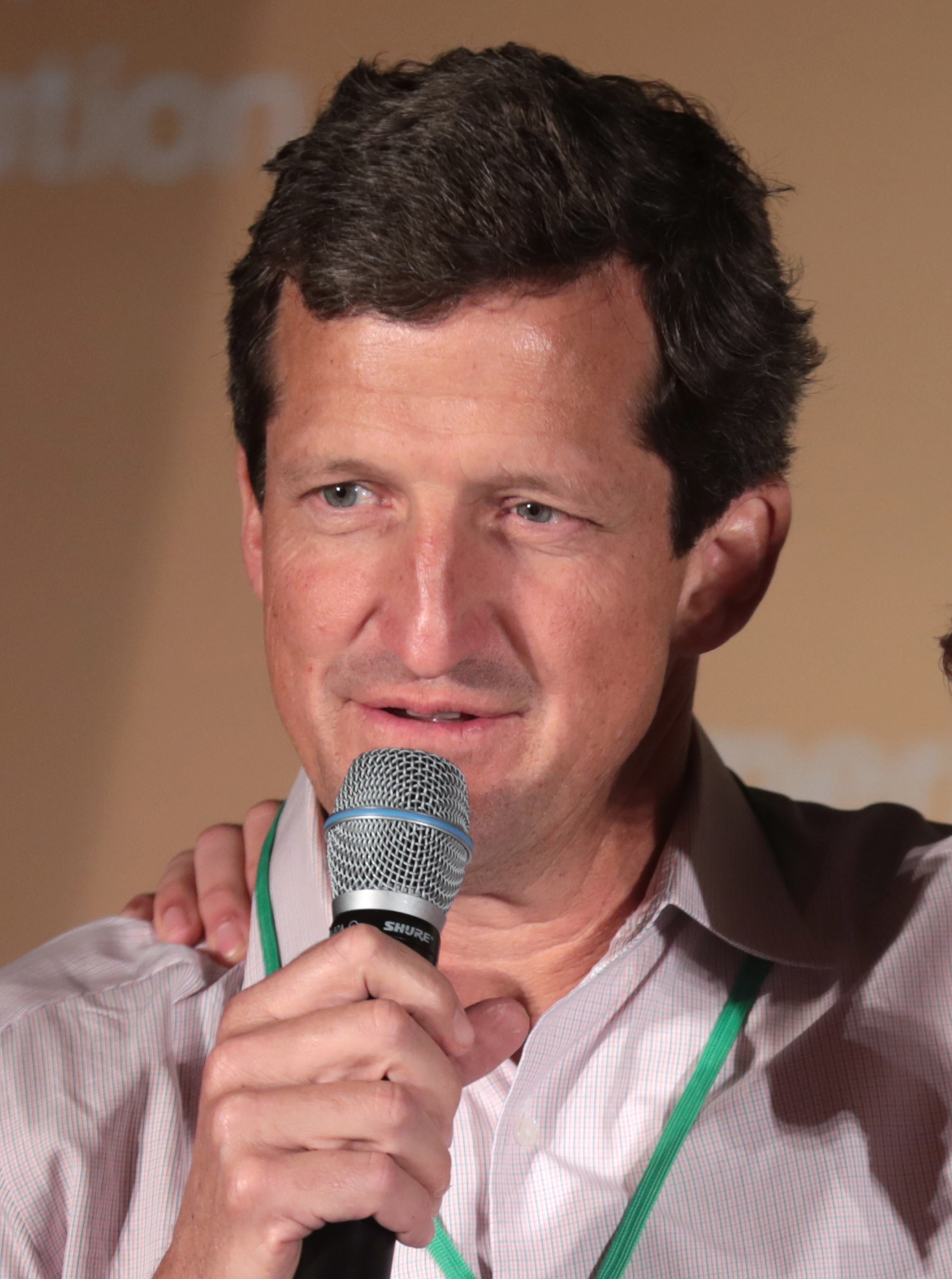
Faison speaking at the American Conservation Coalition's yearly summit (June 11th, 2022)

Jay Faison (born November 29, 1967) is an American entrepreneur and a conservative philanthropist focused on climate change from North Carolina. He was founder and CEO of SnapAV. In 2014, he sold the vast majority of his shares in SnapAV and invested $175 million to start the ClearPath Foundation.

== Family life and education ==
Faison was born in Charlotte, North Carolina, in 1967. His father, Henry Faison, was a prominent real estate developer in Charlotte who founded and chaired Faison Enterprises.

Faison earned a BA in economics from UNC Chapel Hill, and graduated from the University of Virginia Darden School of Business with an MBA in 1995. He lives in Charlotte, with his wife, Olga, and three children, Henry, Hannah and Amelia.

== Career ==
After business school Faison started and ran Blockbuster Portugal, which had 27 stores. After meeting his wife Olga, he then returned to the U.S. and bought a small home technology company, which grew to be the largest in the Charlotte region. Faison founded SnapAV six years later, in 2005. SnapAV designs and distributes audio-visual equipment to integrators, from speakers to surveillance systems.

== Philanthropy ==
=== ClearPath Foundation ===
Faison decided to sell his majority-share in SnapAV, and donate most of that money, $175 million, to create the ClearPath Foundation. "I sold my business because I wanted to get into philanthropy during the prime of my career rather than the end of it. It was time to give back." His goal was to accelerate conservative clean energy solutions, generally preferring "innovation instead of regulation" and opposing policy such as the Clean Power Plan and subsidies for wind or solar energy, while promoting expanded fracking, nuclear power, and hydropower. "I always felt a little alone out there as a Republican," Faison said in an interview, "and so I started ClearPath to create a dialogue around this in a way that hadn’t been done before and sort of be part of the solution."

He runs the foundation as its Managing Partner. ClearPath has expanded into three entities: The 501(c)(3) ClearPath Foundation non-profit, ClearPath Action 501(c)(4) lobbying arm and the ClearPath Action Fund super PAC.

ClearPath specifically promotes nuclear, natural gas, carbon capturing technologies for gas and coal generation, hydropower and innovation. The organization's mantra is "more innovation, less regulation."

=== Political donations ===
Faison has been a regular contributor to Republican political candidates. His ClearPath Action Fund spent more than $4.8 million for 15 endorsed Republican candidates in the 2016 election. Thirteen of those endorsements won reelection. He has also donated to many Republicans directly, from Mitch McConnell to Rob Portman to the National Republican Senatorial Committee, including a $500,000 donation to former New Hampshire Senator Kelly Ayotte's SuperPAC.
