= Helen Dragas =

Business executive and university rector

Helen E. Dragas is a Virginia real estate developer and the CEO of the Dragas Companies. She is also a former member of, and rector for, the University of Virginia Board of Visitors.

== Early life and career ==
=== Education ===
Dragas attended the University of Virginia and graduated with a B.A. in economics and foreign affairs in 1984. She also graduated from the Darden Graduate School of Business Administration in 1988. By the early 1990s Dragas had become the President of the Tidewater Mortgage Bankers Association.

=== The Dragas Companies ===
The Dragas Companies is a southeastern Virginia real estate development and building company founded by Dragas' father and uncle, George and Mark Dragas, in 1968. Helen Dragas’ first job, as a teenager, was interviewing customers at her family's company about their purchases. Helen Dragas was named president and CEO of the Dragas Companies in 1996 and has remained in that position since. Under her tenure, the company has received numerous local awards, and three national awards: the Lee Evans Award for Building Management Excellence in 1999, and the 2009 Lee Evans Award for Management Excellence in 2009, and the Best Builders Award from Builder Magazine, also in 2009. It is now the region's largest homebuilder, with a focus of improving upon the quality of low-price homes in the area.

In 2007 the Dragas Companies donated $1.5 million to the cities of Virginia Beach, Norfolk and Chesapeake for their use in dealing with homelessness and improving education for children in poverty. In 2009 the Dragas Companies spent over $5 million to voluntarily remediate Chinese drywall that was installed by a subcontractor in over 70 homes without Dragas' knowledge. Helen Dragas was named Virginia Beach's 2009 First Citizen. She was also featured by The Virginian-Pilot in a 2010 article about successful female homebuilders and their achievements in the workplace.

In 2014, Dragas earned a top-15 spot in the Inside Business–Hampton Roads Business Journal's Power List of people who shape and influence the region of over 1.6 million people. The editor noted Dragas’ tenacity and called for her to apply her leadership in helping the community combat challenges of economic growth, education, and workforce development.

=== Other positions ===
Dragas has served on the Virginia State Transportation Board, which makes decisions on state spending and transportation strategy. Dragas has also served as a director of the utility corporation Dominion Resources since 2010, and has served on their audit committee. She was appointed to the Virginia State Council of Higher Education and the Commonwealth Transportation board by former governor Mark Warner.

== UVA Board of Visitors ==
=== First term ===
Dragas was appointed as a member of the University of Virginia Board of Visitors by then Governor Tim Kaine in 2008. She became rector of the board on July 1, 2011, and was the first woman ever to be elected to the post.

It's been noted that Dragas’ state service was uncontroversial until she made headlines in June 2012 as part of the resignation of UVA President Teresa A. Sullivan. Sullivan announced her resignation as president in early June after only two years in the position, citing "philosophical differences" with the Board of Visitors as her reasoning. Media outlets had reported that the rift between Sullivan and the board may have been, in part, due to Dragas' viewpoint that the university was facing serious financial challenges, and that the administration would need to explore fiscally conservative solutions, something Sullivan was not actively pursuing.

A Washington Post story and a UVA student newspaper story had both claimed that Dragas organized the support necessary to oust Sullivan as president. After the resignation, Dragas assured the community that the board was unified in its actions, but some board members later claimed that they had no knowledge of the Sullivan decision until just before her resignation. A former board member, Randal Kirk, publicly stated that he and others believed that Sullivan was the wrong pick from the start. Public records later revealed that a super-majority of the board supported the change in leadership based on personnel reasons. Dragas became the center of attention for those who supported Sullivan in their expression of dismay. According to a public records release, there were over 450 e-mails sent calling for Dragas to resign as rector. Additionally, the faculty senate of UVA passed a resolution supporting Sullivan and expressing a lack of confidence in Dragas. A newspaper report would later reveal that Sullivan's supporters, mobilized by John O. “Dubby” Wynne, a former UVA rector who had originally hired Sullivan, had established “a ‘war room’ on grounds, where they organized a counterattack, focusing on influential alumni and wavering board members.”

Following the vote, Dragas offered to meet with the faculty senate to discuss the matter, and a meeting took place on June 18, 2012. According to a statement by the faculty senate, the meeting was "cordial," but the faculty senate still demanded both the reinstatement of Sullivan and the resignation of Dragas. As the situation escalated, Governor Bob McDonnell made a statement that if the Board of Visitors did not resolve the issue by their June 26 meeting, he would use his power of appointment to replace all of the board members. At the June 26 meeting, the board unanimously voted to reinstate Sullivan as president. While e-mails show that Dragas had considered resigning from her position as rector during the height of the situation, she was subsequently reappointed to another term on the board by Governor McDonnell, and has released a joint statement with Sullivan to demonstrate a shared commitment to moving on to solving the university's problems.

=== Reconfirmation ===
Dragas was reconfirmed in January 2013. A March 2, 2013 Washington Post article reported that days after Virginia lawmakers confirmed Dragas's reappointment to the board in January, the rector sent the president a lengthy and detailed list of goals to meet this school year. Sullivan claimed that the letter was inappropriate and constituted micromanagement. The American Association of University Professors (AAUP) issued a report on March 14, 2013, criticizing the actions of the Board in general and Dragas in particular. The report stated that Dragas was not prepared for the disruptive influence of online education, that she had previously made uninformed statements, and that she seemed inexperienced in her position. [32] It was noted that the report contained “multiple errors of fact.” The American Council of Trustees and Alumni later praised the work of Dragas and the Board, stating that “If students are to receive a quality and affordable education in Virginia, it is the trustees who are going to have to press for, measure, and demand results." Dragas’ financial support of the university has been documented, noting that she has donated nearly half a million dollars to the university, “but she considers herself a voice for the state's lower- and middle-income families,” added one news report. In April 2013 Dragas was on the losing end of a 14–2 vote to raise tuition, claiming that the rise in tuition was putting the school on an unsustainable track. Dragas argued that tuition was rising faster than the income of Virginia families, so could become a barrier to post-secondary education.

=== End of tenure ===
The Washington Post wrote that the ouster of Sullivan served to be beneficial for the university in terms of developing an attitude in favor of long term change. In an exit interview from the position, Dragas stated that, "I believe we did the right thing in that we pushed for needed change ... We did it the wrong way in that we misunderstood that when you're going to try to solve thorne-y problems at a high-profile, public institution, you need to communicate a lot -- a lot more than we did -- and with a lot of people. And that was a lesson that I, in particular, and the board learned the hard way." Her term as Rector ended at the end of June 2013, though she remains a member of the board.

In August 2013, Dragas was one of only two members of the Board of Visitors to vote against scaling back the university's financial aid program, Access U.Va., which assured low-income students could graduate without debt. The U.Va. Student Council submitted a letter echoing Dragas, requesting the program be maintained as it has operated for nine years. Following the decision, Ms. Dragas maintained her opposition to the measure stating that, “[t]his action raises the cost of a UVa degree substantially for students from low-income families, hurting our diversity and coming at a time when we are already seen as elitist and unwelcoming.” Some alumni and students have begun organizing support and sending emails to administrators in an effort to reverse the decision.

In September 2013, Dragas was noted for further expressing her opposition to tuition increases in the aftermath of a meeting between foundation representatives, administrators, deans and some board members who are advocates for raising in-state student tuition. Later in the Fall at a November meeting, Dragas urged her fellow board members to delay approving elements of a new strategic plan, reiterating a need for more discussion on the plan's potential impacts to tuition and financial aid. Dragas specifically raised a concern about several years of double-digit tuition increases, following comments for the university's president that the possibility of tuition increases have not been ruled out to pay for parts of the strategic plan, especially improvements to curriculum and student engagement.

Ms. Dragas was featured in Hampton Road Magazine's list of “10 Leading Ladies” featuring the advice of powerful and inspiring women. She further mentioned the importance of affordable tuition by attributing her success and inspiration to the fact that she and her family “were able to afford the cost of a life-changing undergraduate and graduate education at the University of Virginia."

=== Advocacy on affordability ===
Throughout 2014, Dragas was further recognized for her advocacy of affordable higher education. Dragas has been joined by other members of the Board in raising concerns that the university has relied too much on yearly tuition increases to backfill stagnant state funding, lack of strategic planning, and declining research.

Dragas and fellow board members have also pointed to the university's lack of a long-term financial plan as one reason for the continued escalation of tuition. In response, in June 2014, the UVa Board of Visitors set up a special subcommittee to work on a long-range plan targeting affordability for students.

During a June meeting of the UVa Board of Visitors, Dragas again raised the issue of the university's public mission to provide affordable access to Virginians, arguing that board members owe their primary duty of loyalty to the public and then to the university. A newspaper article on the meeting pointed to tuition increases, as an example, which may limit access to Virginians with lower incomes but help the university administration avoid difficult budget decisions. Charlottesville's newspaper, The Daily Progress, cheered “Hooray for Helen Dragas”, and editorialized that Dragas was “spot-on in saying that the University of Virginia, including its governing board, should put the public interest first.” Calling her “right on the money on these issues”, The Daily Progress also agreed with Dragas that a proposed code of conduct muzzling board member expression of dissenting views would be an unrighteous decision for a public institution.

== Personal life ==
Dragas lives in Virginia Beach, Virginia. She is married to Lewis Webb, an attorney; they have three children.
