= Thomas Neir =

- Born: c. September 2, 1957 (age 68); Kirkland, Washington, United States
- Education: University of Washington and the Darden Graduate School of Business Administration, University of Virginia
- Occupation: Business executive
- Known for: Former chief executive officer, and founder of, Pacific Coffee Company (until 1994)
- Children: 2

Thomas Neir is an American businessman who is the CEO of TorrX, Inc. and a partner in Cow Hollow Associates, LLC. He also founded and was the chief executive officer of the Pacific Coffee Company from the time of the company's founding until 1994. Neir had also been a hi-tech company executive and senior financial analyst.

== Early life and educational ==
Neir was born in Kirkland, Washington, United States. In 1979, he graduated with a Bachelor of Arts in Economics from the University of Washington. In 1988, he received an MBA from the Darden Graduate School of Business Administration, University of Virginia.

== Career ==
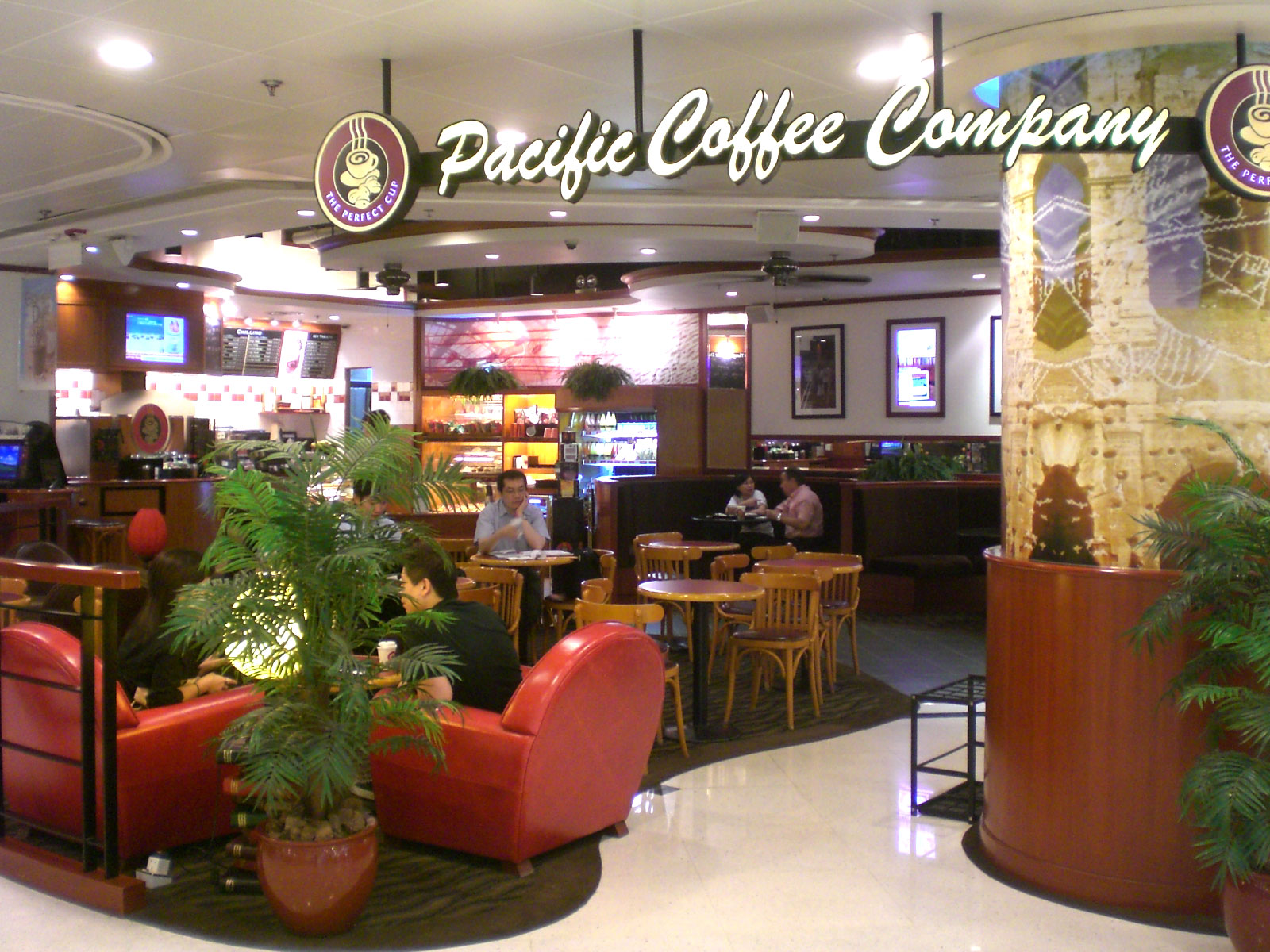
A Pacific Coffee Company store in Telford Plaza, Hong Kong.

Since 1988, Neir worked for a California-based hi-tech company, Tandem Computers, as senior financial analyst and marketing analyst. In late 1990, Neir was transferred to Hong Kong as area finance manager.

=== Foundation of the Pacific Coffee Company ===
In Hong Kong, Neir discovered that there was a lack of European-style coffee houses. He set up the Pacific Coffee Company, targeted at top business persons and senior executive-level customers in Hong Kong. The first retail outlet was located in the Bank of America Tower, Central, Hong Kong.

In 1994, Wharf Holdings (51% of share) and Dr. Roger King (49% of share) acquired Pacific Coffee Company.

The number of Pacific Coffee Company stores and outlets is over 135 in Hong Kong and over 400 locations in Asia, primarily China.

== Personal ==
Neir is married and has two sons.

Thomas Neir was on the board of Seattle Tilth from 2012 to 2017, and was appointed to Kirkland, Washington's Transportation Commission in 2009, termed out after role as chairman.
