= Steven C. Voorhees =

American business executive (born 1954)

Steven C. Voohrees
- Born: 1954 (age 71–72)
- Education: Northwestern University; University of Virginia Darden School of Business
- Occupation: Business Executive
- Known for: CEO of WestRock

Steven C. Voorhees (born 1954) is an American business executive. Voorhees served as the CEO of WestRock, from the formation of WestRock in July 2015 to March 2021 when he stepped down for health reasons. WestRock was formed in July 2015 by the merger of Rock-Tenn Company and MeadWestvaco. WestRock was named one of FORTUNE's “Most Admired Companies” for 6 consecutive years, 2016 to 2021.

== Early life ==
Voorhees was born in 1954. Voorhees graduated from Phillips Academy in Andover, MA in 1972. He graduated from Northwestern University, where he earned a bachelor's degree in economics and mathematics, and he earned a master's in business administration from the University of Virginia Darden School of Business in 1980.

== Career ==
Voorhees worked for Sonat from 1980 to 1999. He started out in corporate planning and rose through the ranks in various management positions. In 1999, Voorhees served as Senior Vice President of Sonat Energy Services. Voorhees was managing partner of Kinetic Partners, a project development and consulting firm, from 1999 to 2000. He served as the chief executive officer of WestRock from 2015 to March 2021. In 2021, WestRock was named in FORTUNE's list of the world's most admired companies.

Before his tenure as CEO of WestRock, Voorhees served as CFO of RockTenn from 2000 until 2013, during which the company grew from $1.4 billion in sales to $9.5 billion in fiscal year 2013.

In 2013, Voorhees served as COO of RockTenn before moving into the CEO position that same year. He also served as executive vice president and chief administrative officer. As CEO, Voorhees expanded the company's geographic presence and facilitated 20 acquisitions.

In 2018, RISI named Voorhees the North American CEO of the year. RISI cited Voorhees as a consolidator having completed the most M&As of any company in the industry during 2015–2018.

Since 2019, Voorhees has been a director at Truist, a merger between BB&T and SunTrust Banks. He is also chair of the Compensation and Human Capital Committees and a member of the Audit and Executive Committee.

In 2021, Voorhees received the Robert T. Gair Award for lifetime achievement in the paper and packaging industry.

== Civic activities ==
In 2016, Voorhees and his wife Celia endowed a scholarship that enables a student to attend the math and science program for minority students, the (MS)2 program, at Phillips Academy in Andover MA for three consecutive years.

Voorhees has served as a trustee of and is a donor to UVA's Darden School Foundation since 2019, where the Voorhees Study Group Room is named for him. In 2024, Voorhees and his wife Celia gifted and dedicated the Socrates Classroom in the Forum Hotel and the Connection Bridge in the arboretum and botanical gardens.

He is also on the board of directors of 3DE Schools by Junior Achievement.

== Personal life ==
Voorhees is married to Celia (second marriage) and has a daughter and son from his first marriage and two stepdaughters from his second marriage. Voorhees played several years for the Greater Atlanta Braves senior baseball team.
