= Teresa A. Sullivan =

American sociologist and university president

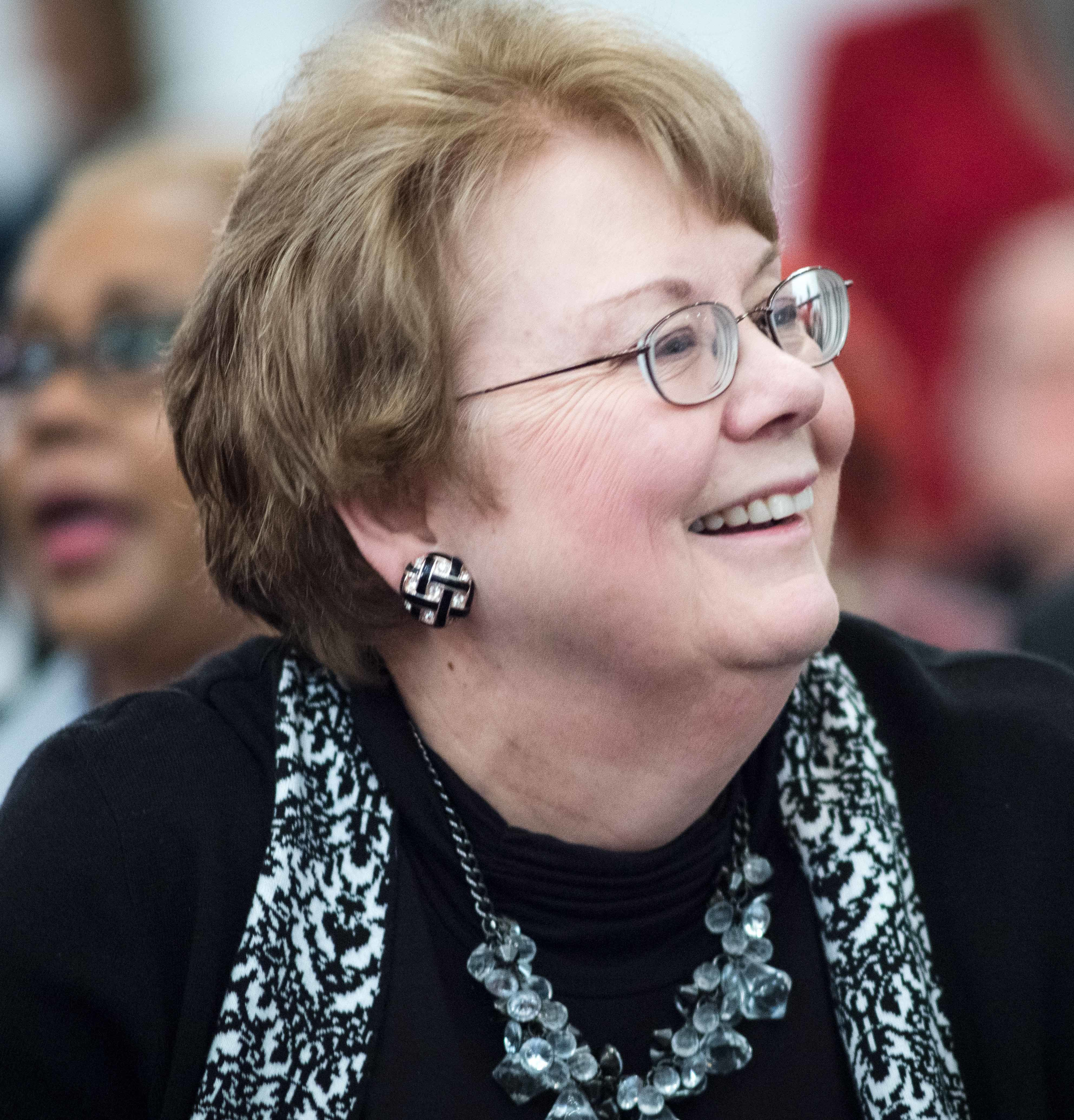

Interim Provost of Michigan State University
- In office October 1, 2019 – June 30, 2020

8th President of the University of Virginia
- In office August 1, 2010 – July 31, 2018
- Preceded by: John T. Casteen III
- Succeeded by: James Ryan

Provost of the University of Michigan
- In office June 1, 2006 – July 1, 2010
- Preceded by: Paul Courant
- Succeeded by: Philip J. Hanlon

Personal details
- Born: Teresa Ann Sullivan; July 9, 1949 (age 77) Kewanee, Illinois, U.S.
- Spouse: Douglas Laycock (m. 1971)
- Education: Michigan State University (BA); University of Chicago (PhD)
- Profession: Sociologist, Professor

Teresa Ann Sullivan (born July 9, 1949) is an American sociologist. She served as interim provost of Michigan State University from 2019 to 2020, as the 8th president of the University of Virginia from 2010 to 2018, and as provost of the University of Michigan from 2006 to 2010.

== Early life and education ==
Sullivan was born on July 9, 1949. In 1970, she received her undergraduate degree from Michigan State University's James Madison College. She was asked to work as an intern in the office of president Clifton R. Wharton Jr.

She continued graduate work, completing her Ph.D. at the University of Chicago in 1975.

== Career ==
=== Academic research ===
Sullivan joined the faculty of the University of Texas as an instructor in sociology. At Texas, she advanced to hold a variety of academic and administrative posts, including the chair of the sociology department, vice provost, and vice president and dean of graduate studies. She was also inducted into Omicron Delta Kappa as a faculty/staff initiate in 1982. She later moved to the University of Michigan, where she served as the Provost and Executive Vice President for Academic Affairs.

Sullivan has written or co-written six books and over 80 scholarly articles in sociology. In 1978, Sullivan authored Marginal Workers, Marginal Jobs: The Underutilization of American of Workers. In 1983, Sullivan co-authored The Dilemma of American Immigration: Beyond the Golden Door with Pastora San Juan Cafferty, Barry R. Chiswick and Andrew M. Greeley. In 1990, she co-authored The Social Organization of Work with Randy Hodson, which was described as a "pathbreaking textbook in the sociology of work" by Daniel B. Cornfield. In 2020, Sullivan published Census 2020: Understanding the Issues, a textbook that covers the historical, logistical, and legal aspects of the United States Census.

She is an elected fellow of the American Academy of Arts & Sciences.

Early in her career, Sullivan published on the labor force and immigration in the United States. This included "Labor Force Composition and Unemployment Trends," (Clifford C. Clogg and Sullivan), "The Occupational Prestige of Women Immigrants," "Documenting Immigration," "Measuring Underemployment and Inequality in the Work Force" (Clogg, Sullivan, and Jan E. Mutchler), "Estimating Labor Absorption with Published Data," and "Women Minority Workers in the New Economy: Optimistic, Pessimistic, and Mixed Scenarios ."

Throughout the 1990s and the 2000s, Sullivan continued to publish on immigration as well as issues undertaken by universities to diversify their campuses—including the 'Texas Top 10 Percent' law. Among Sullivan's publications during this period are: "Student Feelings of Connection to the Campus and Openness to Diversity and Challenge at a Large Research University: Evidence of Progress?" (Jessica J. Summers, Marilla D. Svinicki, Joanna S. Gorin, and Sullivan), "Minority College Aspirations, Expectations and Applications under the Texas Top 10% Law" (Kim M. Lloyd, Kevin T. Leicht, and Sullivan), "Minority Talent Loss and the Texas Top 10 Percent Law" (Sunny Xinchun Niu, Sullivan, and Marta Tienda), and "The Promise and the Peril of the Texas Uniform Admission Law" (with Marta Tienda).

==== Consumer Bankruptcy study ====
In the 1980s, Sullivan worked with legal scholars Elizabeth Warren and Jay Lawrence Westbrook on what could become Phase I of the Consumer Bankruptcy Project, which, at its time, was the largest study of consumer bankruptcy in the United States.

The findings of Phase 1 of this project culminated in several academic articles, including "Limiting Access to Bankruptcy Discharge: An Analysis of Creditors' Data," "Folklore and Facts: A Preliminary Report from the Consumer Bankruptcy Project," "The Use of Empirical Data in Formulating Bankruptcy Policy," and "Laws, Models, and Real People: Choice of Chapter in Personal Bankruptcy." In 1989, Sullivan, Warren, and Westbrook published the book-length study, As We Forgive Our Debtors: Bankruptcy and Consumer Credit in America, which was described as setting "an example for legal scholarship which has rarely been, and will rarely be, met," by Michael J. Herbert. This book was given the Silver Gavel Award in 1990 by the American Bar Association and was a finalist for the American Sociological Association's Distinguished Scholarly Contribution competition. The authors were also invited to give testimony before congressional committees, state legislatures, and the National Commission on Bankruptcy Reform to explain the findings of their study and what their study uncovered about the American consumer bankruptcy system, its strengths, and its weaknesses.

Phase II of the Consumer Bankruptcy Study centered on the use of the bankruptcy system by middle-class Americans. Sullivan, Warren, and Westbrook published several academic articles on their findings including, "Consumer Credit Ten Years Later: A Financial Comparison of Consumer Bankrupts 1981-1991" and "Consumer Bankruptcy in the United States: A Study of Alleged Abuse and of Local Legal Culture: Journal of Consumer Policy." Sullivan also published "Methodological Realities: Social Science Methods and Business Reorganizations." The authors published their book-length study, The Fragile Middle Class: Americans in Debt in 1999, which was described by Andrew Greeley as "a well-designed and carefully executed study."

Phase III of the Consumer Bankruptcy Study studied the growing numbers of women and older Americans filing for bankruptcy. Several academic articles were published on Phase III findings including, "Rethinking The Debates Over Health Care Financing: Evidence from the Bankruptcy Courts" (Melissa B. Jacoby, Sullivan, and Warren), Sullivan's "Gender Differences in Accounts of Bankruptcy," Sullivan, Warren, and Westbrook's "Less Stigma or More Financial Distress: An Empirical Analysis of the Extraordinary Increase in Bankruptcy Filings," "The Increasing Vulnerability of Older Americans" (Deborah Thorne, Sullivan, and Warren), and Sullivan's "Debt and Simulation of Social Class."

=== University of Virginia ===
Sullivan was unanimously elected on January 11, 2010, and became the University's first female president on August 1, 2010.

On June 10, 2012, it was announced to the University that Sullivan would step down from her position on August 15, 2012, after serving two years of a five-year contract. Leaders of the university's governing board said they had decided to remove Sullivan, "largely because of her unwillingness to consider dramatic program cuts in the face of dwindling resources and for her perceived reluctance to approach the school with the bottom-line mentality of a corporate chief executive". Counterpunch presented the dispute as being more about differing views of the academic culture and future direction of the university than immediate financial concerns; whether less popular traditional-classical academic studies should be cut, with funding refocused on more profitable and business-oriented courses and programs.

Media reported the resignation as an "ouster" organized by Helen Dragas, rector of the university's Board of Visitors; with strong suggestions of Dragas' conflicting views of the future of the university, and personal ambitions playing a role in her actions. Although a formal meeting and vote of the full board was not held at the time, Sullivan was presented with the news of her loss of majority support within the board, and given the 'opportunity' to resign.

Dragas made the public announcement of her resignation by email, on behalf of the Board of Visitors. The action generated wide-scale protest and support for Sullivan from students, faculty, alumni, as well as the national academic community. The faculty senate demanded that the leaders of the Board of Visitors, Rector Helen Dragas and Vice Rector Mark J. Kington, be removed. The student government demanded an explanation for the ouster. In the face of this pressure, including a statement from Virginia Governor Robert McDonnell that he would remove the entire board if they failed to resolve the issue at their June 26 meeting, the board unanimously voted to reinstate Sullivan as president.

In 2014 Rolling Stone published a defamatory story, "A Rape on Campus," that falsely stated a gang rape had taken place in one of the University's fraternities. Sullivan suspended all Greek organizations until January 9, 2015. Robby Soave, one of the first to question the story, criticized along with other legal scholars, the legality of Sullivan's actions. In January 2015 Sullivan acknowledged that the magazine's reporting had been "discredited": the story's author failed to interview numerous alleged witnesses named in the source's account, in addition to other inconsistencies.

Sullivan said,

"Before the Rolling Stone story was discredited, it seemed to resonate with some people simply because it confirmed their darkest suspicions about universities—that administrations are corrupt; that today's students are reckless and irresponsible; that fraternities are hot-beds of deviant behavior."

In January 2017, Sullivan announced her intention to retire effective September 30, 2018. She was succeeded by James Ryan on August 1, 2018.

=== Michigan State University ===
On September 16, 2019, Michigan State University named Sullivan as the new interim provost and executive vice president for academic affairs, effective October 1, 2019, serving through the end of the academic year.

== Personal life ==
Sullivan is married to legal scholar Douglas Laycock, known for his work on religious freedom.

Academic offices
Preceded by John T. Casteen III	President of the University of Virginia; 2010–2018	Succeeded by James Ryan
Preceded by Paul N. Courant	Provost of the University of Michigan; 2006–2010	Succeeded by Philip J. Hanlon
