= Roger L. Werner =

Roger L. Werner is an American businessman and cable TV executive. He was the Chief Executive Officer and the Chief Operating Officer of ESPN. He also founded Speedvision (now Fox Sports 1) and Outdoor Life Network. Werner served as president and chief executive officer (CEO) of the Outdoor Channel, Outdoor Life Network and Speedvision.

Werner is a member of an Automobile Competition Committee of the United States board that hears appeals regarding motorsport infractions.

== Education ==
He is a graduate of Trinity College in Hartford, Connecticut. He holds a Masters in Business Administration (MBA) from the University of Virginia (1977) where he was class president. He currently serves as a member of the University of Virginia Darden School of Business Foundation Board of Trustees.

== Career ==
Werner’s career in the television programming industry began in 1979 when he joined the international management firm McKinsey & Company. He left McKinsey to become ESPN’s chief operating officer in March 1982. In 1988, Werner became the network’s president and CEO. During Werner's time at ESPN, the network became the largest cable television network, grew from $1 million to over $600 million in annual sales, and from an annual loss of $30 million to profits of approximately $150 million.

In November 1990, Werner left ESPN and became president and chief executive of Prime Ventures. Prime Ventures was owned by cable pioneer Bill Daniels and had stakes in various regional sport networks. During this time, he also became president of Prime Ticket (now Fox Sports West), another company owned by Bill Daniels. Prime Ticket was the largest regional sports network. Daniels sold both Prime Ventures and Prime Network by August 1994. Upon the sale, Werner left the companies.

In 1994, Werner developed Speedvision as a channel for motor racing enthusiasts. In 1995, he developed the Outdoor Life Network. Werner served as both networks’ President and CEO. In 2001, Werner left Speedvision when the Fox network bought Speedvision, including Werner's share in the company. Fox acquired Speedvision for $880 million and renamed it Speed. In 2013, Fox again renamed the channel as Fox Sports 1. In the same transaction for Speevision, Fox bought Outdoor Life Network, including Werner's share in the company. Fox turned around and sold the Outdoor Life Network to Comcast. In 2005, Outdoor Life Network changed its name to Versus and in 2011, changed its name again to NBC Sports Network.

From October 2006 to February 2012 Werner served as president and CEO of Outdoor Channel Holdings. Werner remained on the board of directors until Outdoor's Channel was bought in February 2012 by Kroenke Sports Enterprises, a Denver-based private company.

In 2014, Werner founded Torque.TV, a motorsports streaming video service, which later was merged into Motor Trend On Demand.

Werner, as of 2020, also serves as the National Motorsports Final Appeals Officer, overseeing final appeals of penalties handed out by NASCAR.
