= Eric Chewning =

American defense policy advisor and businessman

Eric D. Chewning
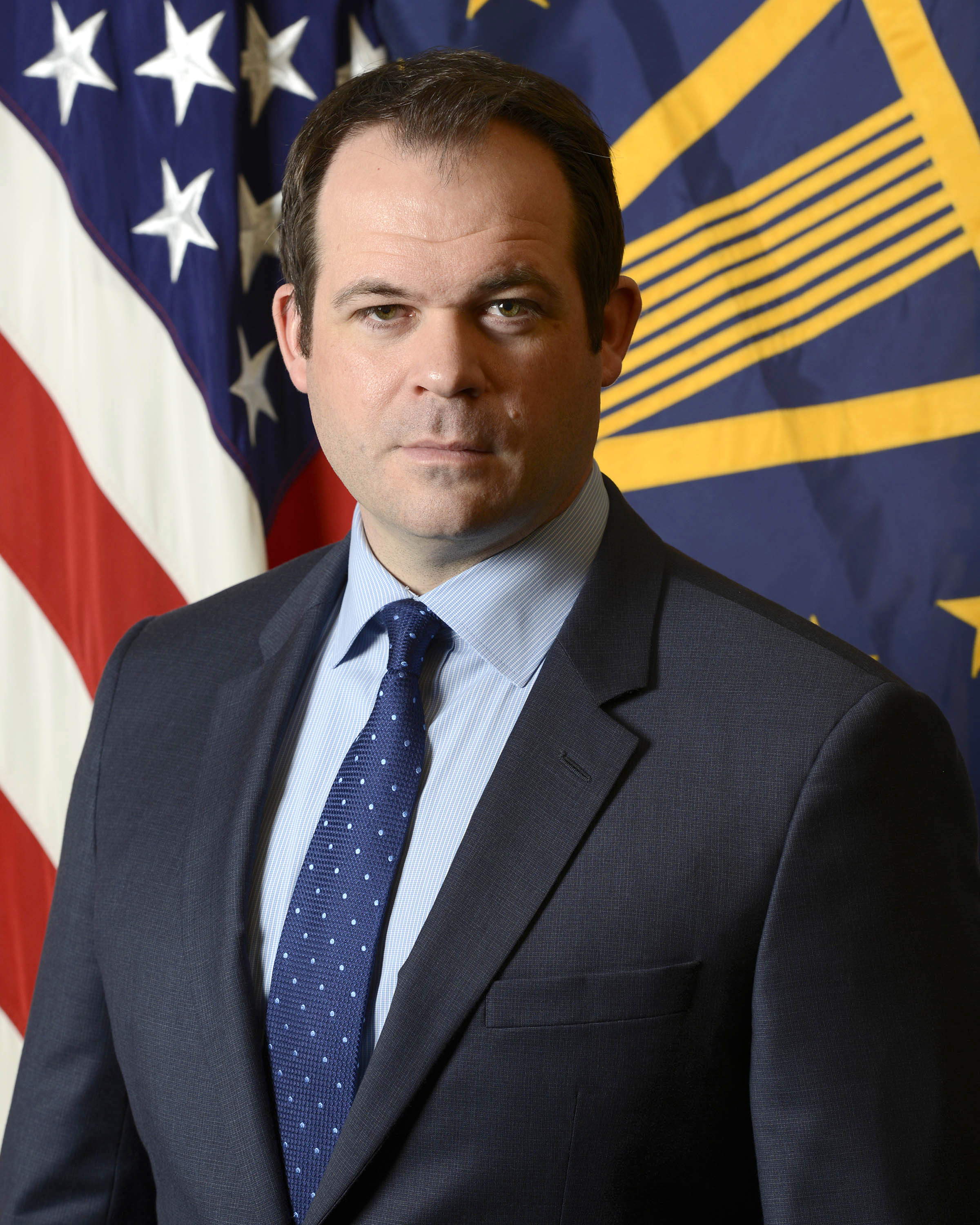

Chief of Staff to the United States Secretary of Defense
- In office January 2019 – January 2020
- President: Donald Trump
- Preceded by: Kevin Sweeney
- Succeeded by: Jen Stewart

Deputy Assistant Secretary of Defense for Industrial Base Policy
- In office October 2017 – January 2019
- President: Donald Trump
- Succeeded by: Jennifer Santos

Personal details
- Party: Republican
- Education: University of Chicago (BA) (MA); University of Virginia (MBA)

Eric Chewning is an American businessman, Army veteran, and former senior military official. As of 2025, he is executive vice president of strategy and development for HII, America’s largest shipbuilder.

== Military service ==
As highlighted in Fred Kaplan’s book, The Insurgents: David Petraeus and the Plot to Change the American Way of War, Chewning left a career as a Wall Street investment banker to join in the U.S. Army after the terrorist attacks of 11 September 2001. Upon completing Officer Candidate School and training as a military intelligence officer, he was assigned to the 1st Battalion, 5th Cavalry Regiment in the 2nd Brigade of the U.S. Army’s First Cavalry Division. He deployed to Iraq in 2004 as the unit’s tactical intelligence officer, and helped to pioneer counterinsurgency tactics for conventional U.S. Army units.

Upon returning to the U.S., Chewning and Douglas Ollivant co-wrote an influential article in Military Review, entitled "Producing Victory: Rethinking Conventional Forces in Counterinsurgency Operations"; and a 2007 follow-on article, "Producing Victory: a 2007 postscript for implementation." The articles argued that U.S. forces should abandon sprawling forward operating bases and move into Iraqi communities. The premise of their argument was that counterinsurgency requires military units to simultaneous execute security operations, train local security forces, promote economic development, and foster political institutions. Ollivant and Chewning reasoned that conventional military units best operate in such an environment when working with indigenous security forces within the target population.

The essays, which were based on Ollivant and Chewning’s experience during combat operations in Iraq in 2004 and 2005, influenced the tactical deployment of US and Iraqi ground forces during the “Surge”. A 2006 New York Times op-ed called it “a good blueprint” for turning around the military situation in Iraq. In March 2010, Ollivant and Chewning published an article in The American Interest outlining the military, political, and economic actions necessary for a successful US-Iraqi relationship after the initial US troop withdrawal.

== Business experience ==
Chewning returned to the private sector in 2008, ultimately becoming a partner at the global management consulting firm McKinsey & Company. While at McKinsey, he worked alongside financial sponsors and corporate leaders in the global aerospace, defense, government services, and space industries. His client work focused on corporate strategy, M&A advisory, and post-merger integrations. Chewning is a graduate of The University of Virginia Darden School of Business.

== Civilian appointee in the U.S. Defense Department ==
In October 2017, Defense Secretary James Mattis appointed Chewning as Deputy Assistant Secretary for Manufacturing and Industrial Base Policy (now Industrial Policy). In this role, Chewning focused on issues at the intersection of technology, industrial enterprises, and national security. He supported a more geoeconomic approach to DoD industrial policy, specifically in countering the macro forces working against the health of the U.S. defense industrial base.

Chewning was the architect of the U.S. government-wide assessment of the manufacturing and defense industrial base called for in President Donald Trump's Executive Order 13806 in 2017. The report identified five macro forces that needed to be addressed:

1. Sequestration and DoD budget uncertainty
2. Decline of U.S. manufacturing capability and capacity
3. Harmful U.S. government business practices
4. Industrial policies of competitor nations – specifically China
5. Diminishing U.S. stem and trade skills.

The unclassified version of the report identified more than 300 industrial base risks ranging from access to rare earth magnets to single, sole source suppliers for key military equipment such as cannon gun tubes. He also testified before the U.S. Senate and House of Representatives to advocate to modernize the Committee on Foreign Investment in the United States and address the transfer of militarily relevant technologies to China.

This culminated in the passage of the Foreign Investment Risk Modernization Act as part of the FY2018 National Defense Authorization Act. In a November 2018 speech at the Atlantic Council on implementing defense industrial policy, Eric outlined five levers by which the Department of Defense implements its industrial policy. These include: acquisition policy, procurement decisions, DoD-direct investment, regulatory review of mergers through CFIUS and antitrust authorities, and exports controls.

=== Chief of Staff to the Secretary and Deputy Secretary of Defense ===
In January 2019, then acting Secretary of Defense Patrick Shanahan appointed Chewning as the chief of staff to the Secretary and Deputy Secretary of Defense. With the announcement, one outside observer remarked “in my mind Eric is probably the smartest person over there.” During the summer of 2019, Chewning played a critical stabilizing role in the Pentagon as an unprecedented three separate secretaries led DoD in a 30-day period.

== Return to McKinsey ==
In January 2020, the Pentagon announced Chewning's planned departure from his role and a return to McKinsey.
