= Robert Bruner =

American academic

Robert F. Bruner
- Education: B.A. from Yale University; MBA and DBA from Harvard Business School
- Occupation: Distinguished Professor of Business Administration
- Website: Robert Bruner's Blog

Robert F. Bruner is an American academic who is University Professor at the University of Virginia, Distinguished Professor of Business Administration, and Dean Emeritus of the Darden School of Business. He was the eighth dean of Darden and has been a faculty member since 1982. He teaches and conducts research in finance and management.

== Early life and education ==
Born in Chicago, Bruner received a B.A. from Yale University in 1971 and the MBA and DBA degrees from Harvard University in 1974 and 1982, respectively. Bruner served as a loan officer and investment analyst for First Chicago Corporation from 1974 to 1977. He served as a visiting professor at INSEAD, IESE and Columbia University business schools.

== Career ==
Bruner has led innovation in management education. In 2011, Bruner led a global task force of Deans for the Association to Advance Collegiate Schools of Business. The task force produced a comprehensive review of global management education. The resulting book-length report, The Globalization of Management Education, urged educational leaders to rise to the challenges of globalization.

As a financial economist, Bruner is best known for his research on mergers and acquisitions, corporate finance and financial panics. His books include Deals from Hell, Applied Mergers and Acquisitions and The Panic of 1907: Lessons Learned from the Market’s Perfect Storm. The last title, co-authored with Sean D.Carr, was published in 2007 and attracted attention for its discussion of the underpinnings of financial crises.

In 2011, CNNMoney/Fortune named him “Dean of the Year.”

Bruner is also a prolific writer of case studies in Management, and has featured among the top 40 case authors consistently, since the list was first published in 2016 by The Case Centre. Bruner ranked 13th In 2018/19, ninth in 2017/18, seventh in 2016/17 and 2015/16.

== Personal life ==
Bruner and his wife, Bobbie, have two sons.
