= ClearPath Foundation =

American environmental organization

- Formation: 2014
- Type: 501(c)3 organization
- Location: Charlotte, NC, Washington, DC
- CEO: Jay Faison
- Revenue: $165,599,943 (2014)
- Expenses: $241,776 (2014)
- Website: www.clearpath.org

ClearPath Foundation is a nonprofit organization based in Charlotte, North Carolina, and Washington, D.C., that is focused on "conservative clean energy". According to a press release, the organization was founded to propose and support policies that accelerate clean energy without expanding the size of government.

== History ==
ClearPath was founded by Republican entrepreneur and philanthropist Jay Faison in 2013 to change the conservative viewpoint on clean energy. After selling his majority stake in the audio-visual company SnapAV, Faison donated US$165 million to start ClearPath, with a mission of "accelerating conservative clean energy solutions."

== Activities ==
ClearPath advances its mission through "strategic grant-making, advocacy, and digital platforms", and focuses on energy policy, polling, and analysis.

== Principles ==
The ClearPath website lists five principles used for analyzing policy. ClearPath believes in "small government, free markets, and American innovation", as well as pollution risk management, cost-benefit analysis and energy security.

== Policy areas ==
- Nuclear energy – ClearPath proposes expanded use of nuclear power in the United States, calling it "one of America's greatest success stories". In particular, they support existing nuclear plants, as well as advanced nuclear such as small modular reactors and generation IV reactors. In February 2016, ClearPath's CEO Jay Faison proposed developing "super-competitive, next-generation" nuclear reactors.
- Hydropower – ClearPath supports hydropower development, calling it "one of America’s most overlooked energy resources". They propose expanding the electrification of non-powered dams, hydropower financing reform, and permitting reform.
- Energy Innovation – ClearPath supports increased basic energy research funding for the Department of Energy (DOE) to accelerate development, and proposes paying for increased research through expanded oil and gas drilling. They also propose giving private companies greater access to the DOE's national labs.
