= Texas Journal on Civil Liberties & Civil Rights =

- Discipline: Law
- Language: English

Publication details
- Former names: Texas Forum on Civil Liberties & Civil Rights
- History: 1992–present
- Publisher: University of Texas School of Law (United States)
- Frequency: Biannually

Standard abbreviations
- Bluebook: Tex. J. C.L. & C.R.
- ISO 4: Tex. J. Civ. Lib. Civ. Rights

Indexing
- ISSN: 1930-2045
- LCCN: 2004234500
- OCLC no.: 53817366

Links
- Journal homepage; Online archive

Texas Journal on Civil Liberties & Civil Rights is a biannual student-produced law review at the University of Texas School of Law (Austin, TX, United States). It was established in 1992 as the Texas Forum on Civil Liberties & Civil Rights and covers the status of civil rights law and analyses of the relevant issues surrounding these laws.

In addition to the biannual publication, the journal hosts an annual symposium. It also hosts speeches, brown bag events, and other opportunities to expose law students to this area of law.
