= Pacific Coffee =

Hong Kong based coffee chain

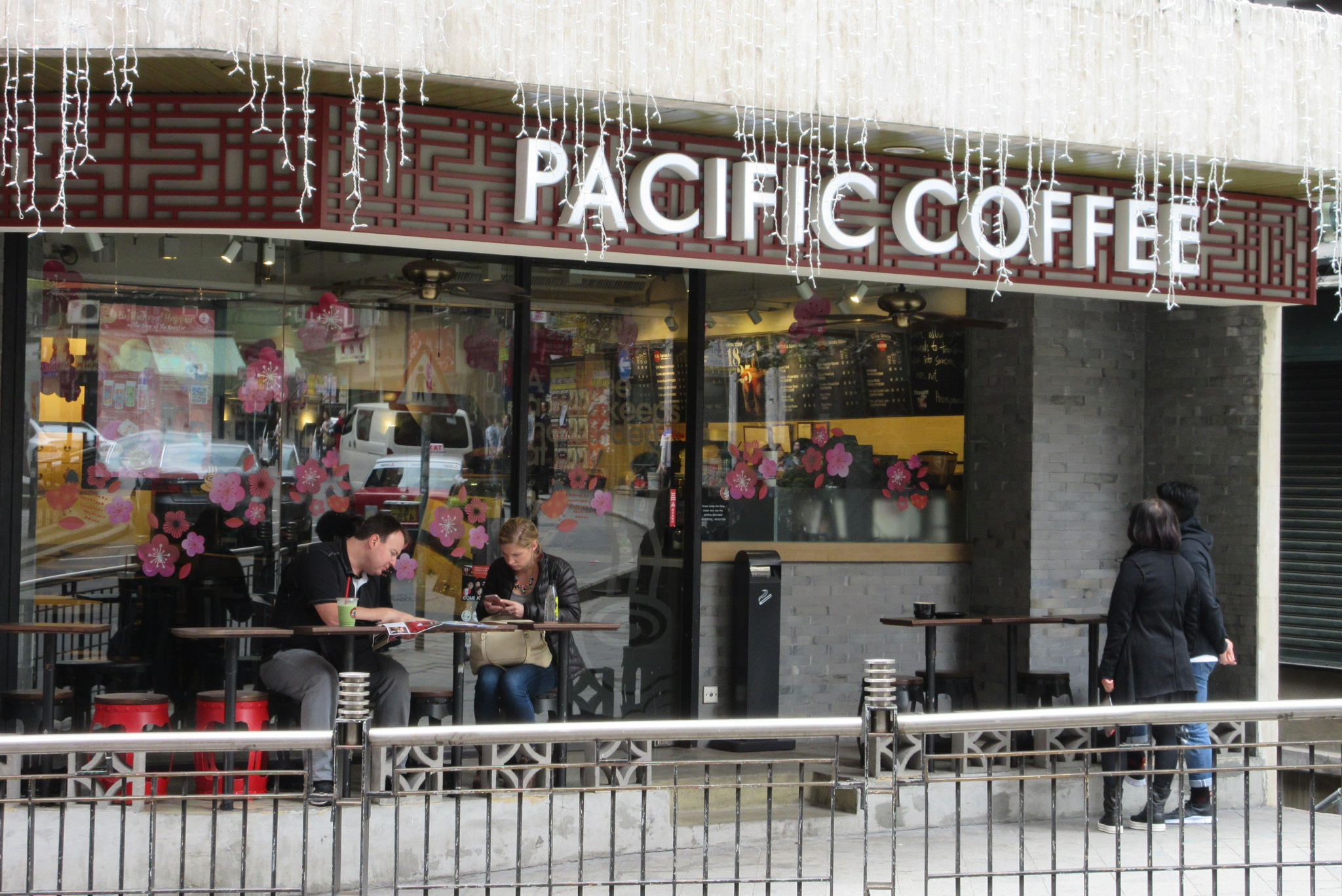
- Native name: 太平洋咖啡
- Type: Coffeehouse
- Industry: Restaurants; Retail Coffee and Tea; Retail Beverages
- Founded: 1992; 34 years ago
- Founder: Thomas Neir
- Headquarters: Hong Kong
- Owner: China Resources Enterprise
- Website: www.pacificcoffee.com

Pacific Coffee (formerly known as Pacific Coffee Company; abbv. "PCC") is a coffee house chain from Hong Kong, with outlets in China, Singapore and Malaysia. The company was founded by Thomas Neir, and eventually became a subsidiary of Wharf Holdings in 1994. Until April 2005, Chevalier Pacific (formerly Chevalier iTech) acquired the chain from Wharf for HK$205 million.

In June 2010, China Resources Enterprise (CRE) and Chevalier forged a partnership to further expand the Pacific Coffee business in Mainland China with CRE being a major shareholder and to have Pacific Coffee developed under the umbrella of CRE's Retail Business Unit.

Apart from its stores, PCC also sells own-brand coffee beans and Jura brand coffee machines to distributors and corporate clients, such as banks, airline companies, clubs and hotels. Its coffee beans are sold in Hong Kong, Macau and Singapore.

== Hong Kong ==
PCC was started by Thomas Neir of Seattle, who came to Hong Kong in 1992. Neir saw a lack of European-style coffee houses in his adopted city. The first PCC outlet opened in 1993 at the Bank of America Tower in Hong Kong's Central district. In 2005, the PCC at The Peak was voted "Asia's top favourite wireless hotspot" in a survey of 1,996 people in 20 countries by Intel.

== Overseas branches ==
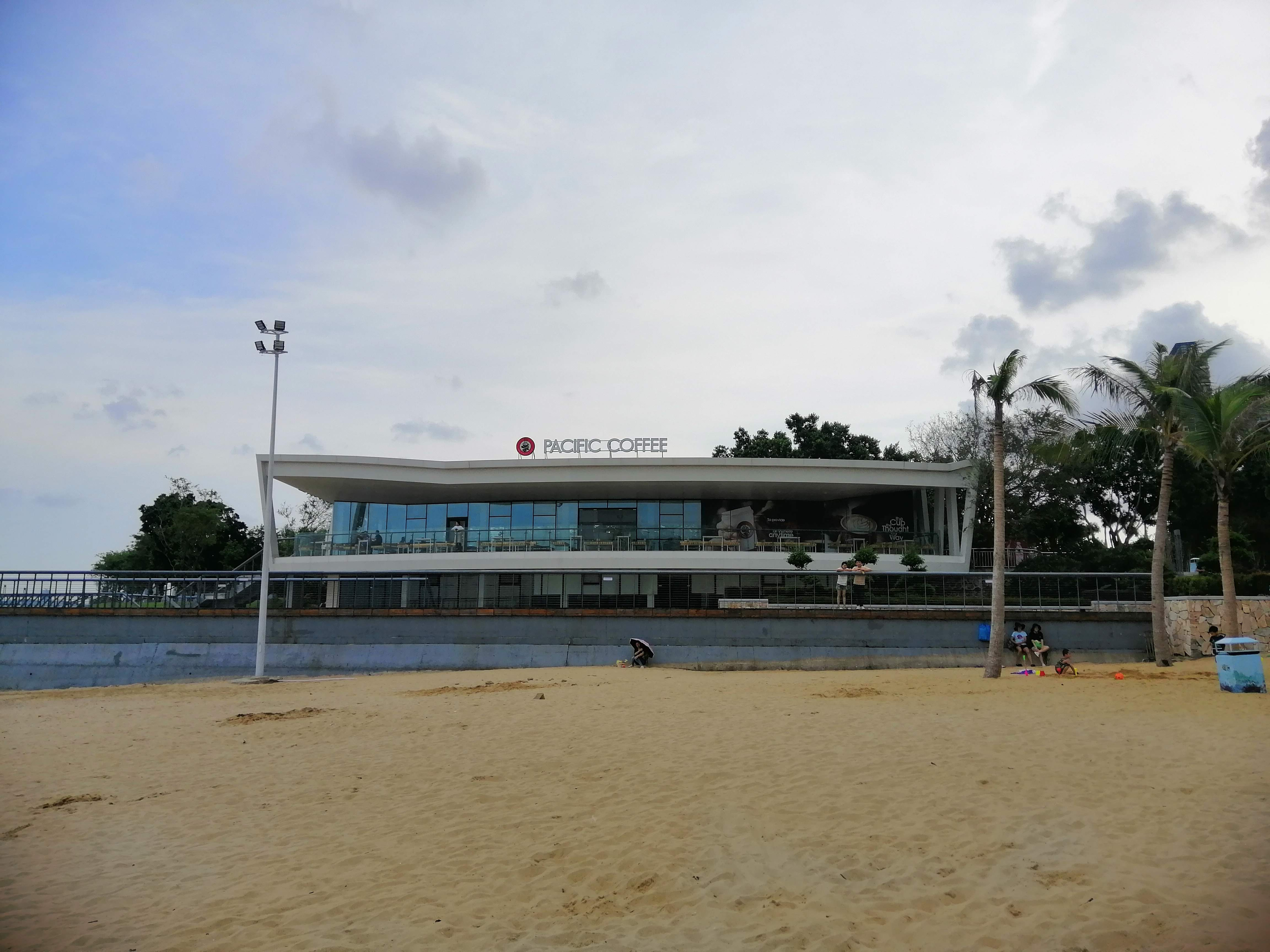
A branch in Zhuhai, China

PCC has 90 branches in Hong Kong, as well as branches in Macau and the mainland Chinese cities of Beijing, Shanghai, Foshan, Shenzhen, Guangzhou, Hangzhou, Nanjing, Shanwei, Shenyang, Suzhou, Wuxi, Xi'an, Xingning and Zhuhai.

At its peak, the company operated nearly 500 stores throughout Greater China. Changing customer behaviours following the Covid-19 pandemic have however caused massive closures, and by the mid-2020s the number of stores outside Hong Kong was only about 100.

== See also ==
- Starbucks
- McCafé
- List of coffeehouse chains
