= The Review of Litigation =

- Discipline: Litigation
- Language: English

Publication details
- History: 1980–current
- Publisher: University of Texas School of Law
- Frequency: quarterly

Standard abbreviations
- Bluebook: Rev. Litig.
- ISO 4: Rev. Litig.

Indexing
- ISSN: 0734-4015
- OCLC no.: 6317797

Links
- Journal homepage

The Review of Litigation (TROL) is a law journal established in 1980 at the University of Texas School of Law to serve as "a national forum of interchange of academic and practical discussion of various aspects of litigation." The journal publishes articles on "topics related to procedure, evidence, trial and appellate advocacy, alternative dispute resolution, and often-litigated substantive law."

The journal publishes four issues annually, one of which is a symposium issue published in collaboration with the litigation section of American Association of Law Schools. Past topics have included mass torts and conflicts of interest.

The journal is often cited in published court opinions, and is the most cited law journal in the category "Civil Litigation and Dispute Resolution" in the Washington & Lee Law School law journal rankings as of 2020. In 2011, an article from the journal on jurisdiction in products liability cases was cited by the U.S. Supreme Court.

The full text of the articles and notes is available in many law libraries, and on databases HeinOnline, Westlaw and LexisNexis.
