= University of Virginia =

Public university in Charlottesville, Virginia, US

- Type: Public research university
- Established: January 25, 1819; 207 years ago
- Founder: Thomas Jefferson
- Accreditation: SACS
- Academic affiliations: AAU; ORAU; SCHEV; URA; sea-grant; space-grant
- Endowment: $11.1 billion (FY2025)
- Budget: $5.8 billion (FY2025) (Note: This figure refers to the consolidated operating budget. The consolidated operating budget, including the Academic Division, the Medical Center and the College at Wise, totals $5.8 billion.)
- President: Scott C. Beardsley
- Provost: Brie Gertler (interim)
- Faculty: 3,265 (fall 2019): 3,083 full-time; 182 part-time
- Administrative staff: 6,292 (fall 2019) (Note: The total number of administrative staff listed here represents the total number of Classified Staff and University Staff.): 6,149 full-time; 143 part-time
- Students: 26,685 (fall 2025)
- Undergraduates: 17,848 (fall 2025)
- Postgraduates: 8,837 (fall 2025)
- Location: Charlottesville, Virginia, United States; 38°02′08″N 78°30′12″W
- Campus: 1,135 acres (459 ha); Small suburb
- Other campuses: Arlington; Chantilly; Falls Church; Henrico; McLean; Newport News; Pembroke; Venice
- Newspaper: The Cavalier Daily
- Colors: Orange and blue
- Nicknames: Cavaliers; Wahoos
- Sporting affiliations: NCAA Division I FBS – ACC
- Mascot: Cavalier
- Website: www.virginia.edu

UNESCO World Heritage Site
- Type: Cultural
- Criteria: i, iv, vi
- Designated: 1987 (11th session)
- Part of: Monticello and the University of Virginia in Charlottesville
- Reference no.: 442
- Region: Europe and North America

U.S. National Historic Landmark District
- Official name: University of Virginia Historic District
- Designated: 1971-11-11
- Reference no.: 70000865

The University of Virginia (UVA or Virginia) is a public research university in Charlottesville and Albemarle County, Virginia, United States. It was founded in 1819 by Thomas Jefferson and contains his Academical Village, a UNESCO World Heritage Site. Its original governing Board of Visitors included three U.S. presidents: Jefferson, James Madison, and James Monroe, the latter as sitting president of the United States at the time of its foundation. As its first two rectors, presidents Jefferson and Madison played key roles in the university's foundation, with Jefferson designing both the original courses of study and the university's original architecture. The original campus contains President Monroe's former residence and law office, today used as a residential college.

Now expanded to 1,135 acres (459 ha) of central campus, the modern university is composed of eight undergraduate and three professional schools: the School of Law, the Darden School of Business, and the School of Medicine. The university has been a member of the Association of American Universities since 1904.

The university's leadership, faculty, research staff, and alumni have included several United States presidents, foreign heads of state, Nobel laureates, Pulitzer Prize winners, a Dan David Prize winner, Marshall Scholars, Fulbright Scholars, and 57 Rhodes Scholars—the most of any state university. Its alumni include 31 state governors (including fourteen governors of Virginia) and 33 United States senators. UVA students and alumni have founded companies such as Reddit, Skillshare, VMware, and Space Adventures.

Its athletic teams, the Virginia Cavaliers, have twice won the Capital One Cup for overall athletics prowess and compete in NCAA Division I as members of the Atlantic Coast Conference.

== History ==
=== 1800s ===
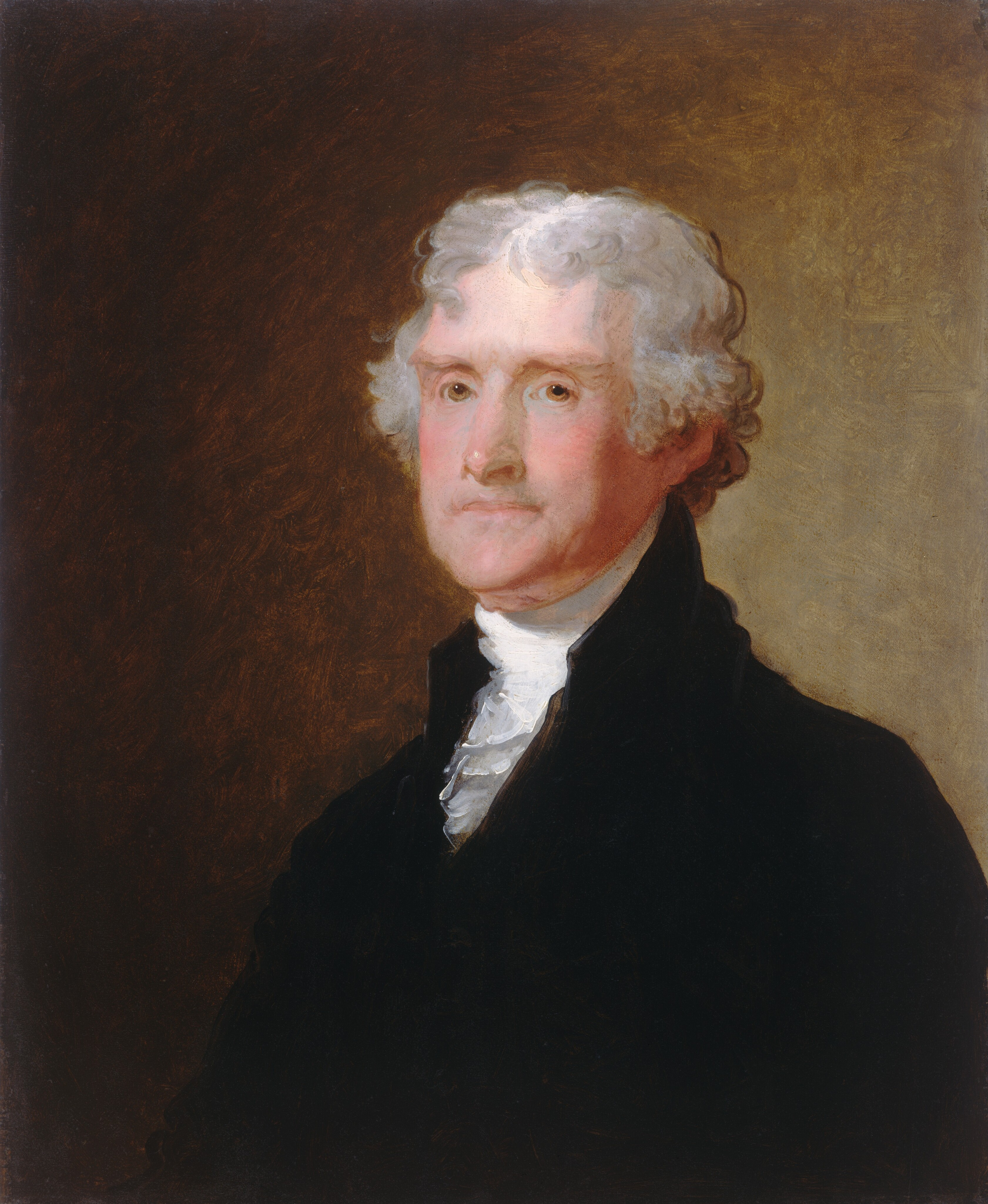
Thomas Jefferson, the university's founder, by Gilbert Stuart (c. 1821)

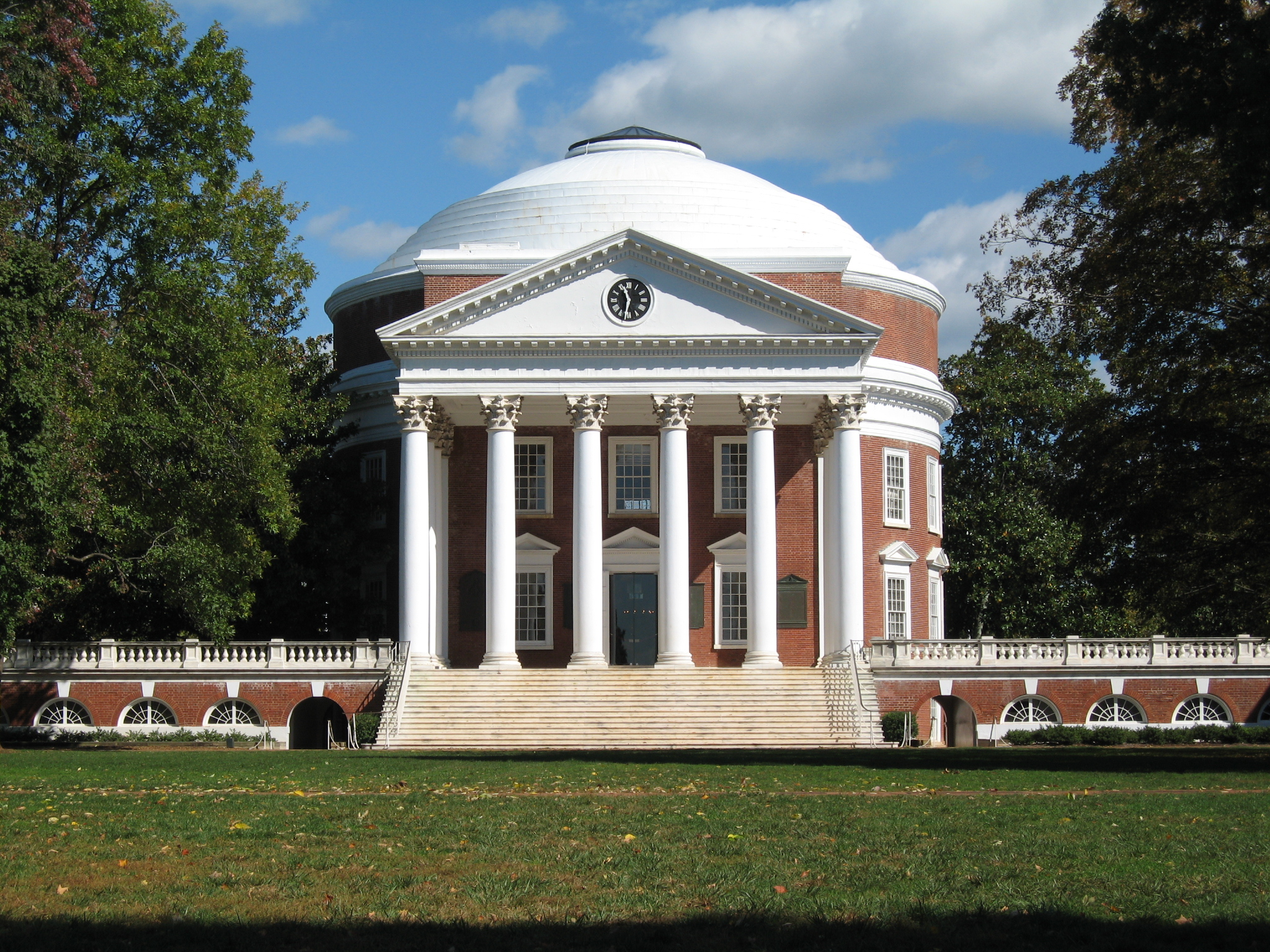
The Rotunda, as pictured from the South Lawn

In 1802, while serving as president of the United States, Thomas Jefferson wrote to artist Charles Willson Peale that his concept of the new university would be "on the most extensive and liberal scale that our circumstances would call for and our faculties meet," and it might even attract talented students from "other states to come, and drink of the cup of knowledge." Virginia was already home to the College of William & Mary in Williamsburg, but Jefferson lost all confidence in his alma mater, partly because of its religious nature—it required all its students to recite a catechism—and its stifling of the sciences. Jefferson had flourished under William & Mary professors William Small and George Wythe decades earlier, but the college was in a period of great decline and his concern became so dire by 1800 that he expressed to British chemist Joseph Priestley, "we have in that State, a college just well enough endowed to draw out the miserable existence to which a miserable constitution has doomed it." These words would ring true some seventy years later when William & Mary fell bankrupt after the Civil War and the Williamsburg college was shuttered completely in 1881, later being revived as primarily a small college for teachers until it regained university status later in the twentieth century. Jefferson envisioned his new university would "be based on the illimitable freedom of the human mind. For here we are not afraid to follow truth wherever it may lead, nor to tolerate any error so long as reason is left free to combat it." He also pushed for the establishment of the planned university to prevent young Southern men from attending Northern colleges where they might be exposed to anti-slavery sentiment; the historian Leslie M. Harris describes the university as being founded partly as a "pro-slavery bulwark".

In 1817, three presidents (Jefferson, James Monroe, and James Madison) and Chief Justice of the United States Supreme Court John Marshall joined 24 other dignitaries at a meeting held in the Mountain Top Tavern at Rockfish Gap. After some deliberation, they selected nearby Charlottesville as the site of the new University of Virginia. The UVA Board of Visitors purchased just outside Charlottesville a farm that had once been owned by James Monroe. The Commonwealth of Virginia chartered a new flagship university to be based on the site in Charlottesville on January 25, 1819.

John Hartwell Cocke collaborated with James Madison, Monroe, and Joseph Carrington Cabell to fulfill Jefferson's dream to establish the university. Cocke and Jefferson were appointed to the building committee to supervise the construction. The UVA Office of Equal Opportunity and Civil Rights is continuing to "seek opportunities to engage and acknowledge with respect that we live, learn, and work on [what once was] the territory of the Monacan Indian Nation." Like many of its peers, the university owned slaves who helped build the campus. They also served students and professors. The Memorial to Enslaved Laborers on Central Grounds was built to memorialize their lives and legacies. The university's first classes met on March 7, 1825.

In contrast to other universities of the day, at which one could study in either medicine, law, or divinity, the first students at the University of Virginia could study in one or several of eight independent schools – medicine, law, mathematics, chemistry, ancient languages, modern languages, natural philosophy, and moral philosophy. Another innovation of the new university was that higher education would be separated from religious doctrine. UVA had no divinity school, was established independently of any religious sect, and the Grounds were planned and centered upon a library, the Rotunda, rather than a church, distinguishing it from peer universities still primarily functioning as seminaries for one particular strain of Protestantism or another. Jefferson opined to philosopher Thomas Cooper that "a professorship of theology should have no place in our institution", and never has there been one. There were initially two degrees awarded by the university: Graduate, to a student who had completed the courses of one school; and Doctor to a graduate in more than one school who had shown research prowess.

Jefferson was intimately involved in the university to the end, hosting Sunday dinners at his Monticello home for faculty and students. Jefferson viewed the university's foundation as having such great importance and potential that he counted it among his greatest accomplishments and insisted his grave mention only his status as author of the Declaration of Independence and Virginia Statute for Religious Freedom, and father of the University of Virginia. Thus, he eschewed mention of his national accomplishments, such as the Louisiana Purchase and any other aspects of his presidency, in favor of his role with the young university.

Initially, some of the students arriving at the university matched the then-common picture of college students: wealthy, spoiled aristocrats with a sense of privilege which often led to brawling, or worse. This was a source of frustration for Jefferson, who assembled the students during the school's first year, on October 3, 1825, to criticize such behavior; but was too overcome to speak. He later spoke of this moment as "the most painful event" of his life.

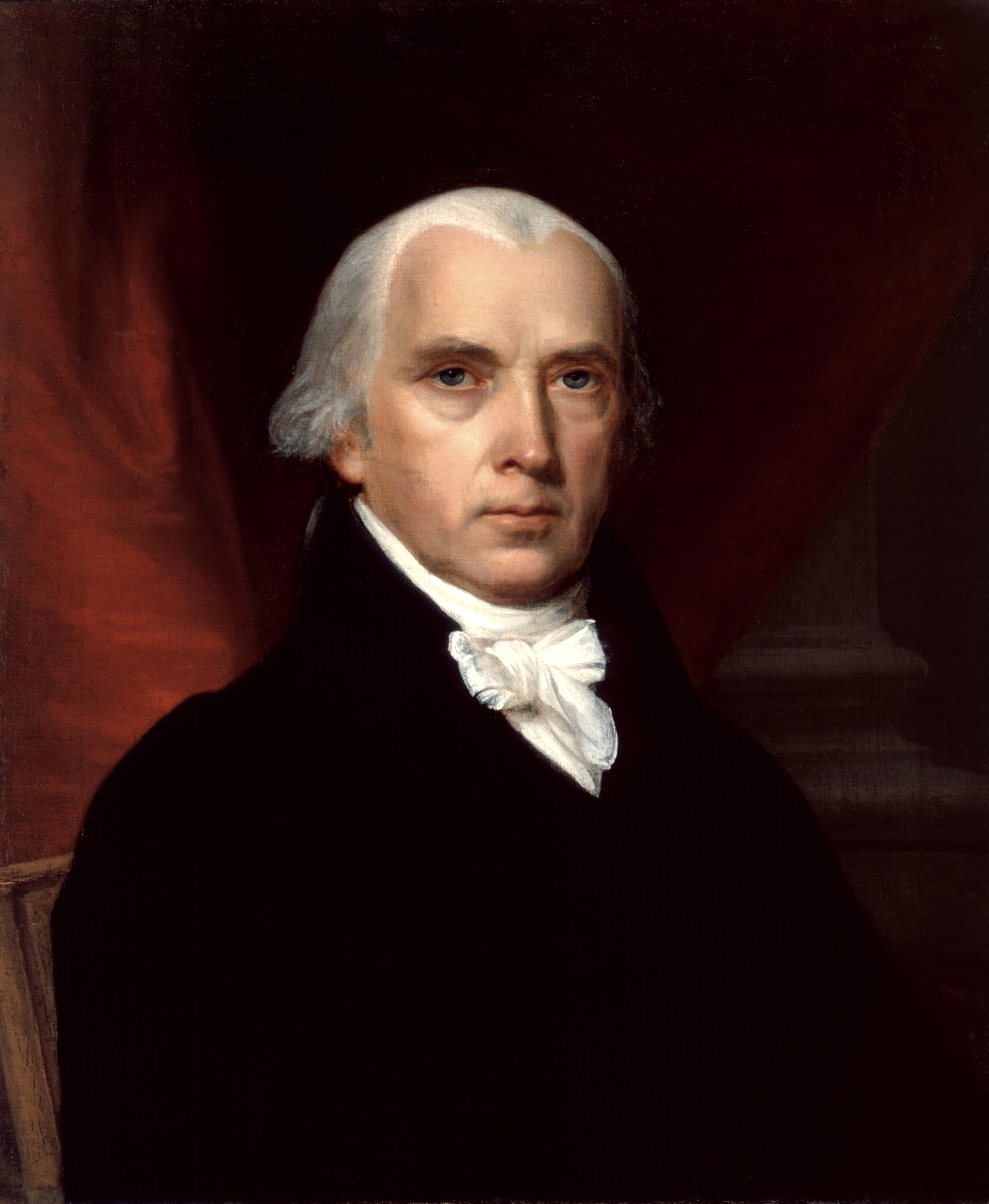
James Madison was the second rector of the University of Virginia until 1836.

Although the frequency of such irresponsible behavior dropped after Jefferson's expression of concern, it did not die away completely. Like many universities and colleges, it experienced periodic student riots, culminating in the shooting death of Professor John A. G. Davis, Chairman of the Faculty, in 1840. This event, in conjunction with the new UVA Honor System and the growing popularity of temperance and a rise in religious affiliation in society in general, seems to have resulted in a permanent change in student attitudes toward reporting the bad behavior, and thus such behavior among students that had so greatly bothered Jefferson finally vanished.

In the year of Jefferson's death in 1826, poet Edgar Allan Poe enrolled at the university, where he excelled in Latin. The Raven Society, an organization named after Poe's most famous poem, continues to maintain 13 West Range, the room Poe inhabited during the single semester he attended the university. He left because of financial difficulties. The School of Engineering and Applied Science opened in 1836, making UVA the first comprehensive university to open an engineering school.

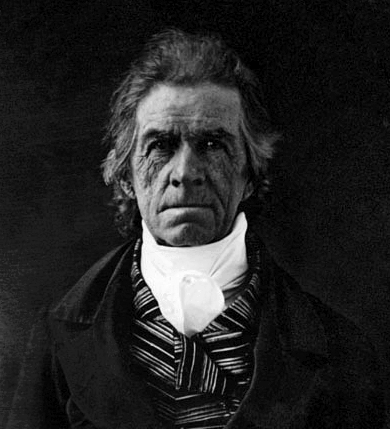
J. Hartwell Cocke supervised construction with Jefferson.

Unlike the majority of Southern colleges, the university was kept open throughout the Civil War, despite its state seeing more bloodshed than any other and the near 100% conscription of the American South. After Jubal Early's total loss at the Battle of Waynesboro, Charlottesville was willingly surrendered to Union forces to avoid mass bloodshed, and UVA faculty convinced George Armstrong Custer to preserve Jefferson's university. Although Union troops camped on the Lawn and damaged many of the Pavilions, Custer's men left four days later without bloodshed and the university was able to return to its educational mission. However, an extremely high number of officers of both Confederacy and Union were alumni. UVA produced 1,481 officers in the Confederate Army alone, including four major-generals, twenty-one brigadier-generals, and sixty-seven colonels from ten different states. John S. Mosby, the infamous "Gray Ghost" and commander of the lightning-fast 43rd Battalion Virginia Cavalry ranger unit, had also been a UVA student.

Thanks to a grant from the Commonwealth of Virginia, tuition became free for all Virginians in the year 1875. During this period, the University of Virginia remained unique in that it had no president and mandated no core curriculum from its students, who often studied in and took degrees from more than one school. However, the university was also experiencing growing pains. As the original Rotunda caught fire and was gutted in 1895, there would soon be sweeping changes, much greater than merely reconstructing the Rotunda in 1899.

=== 1900s ===
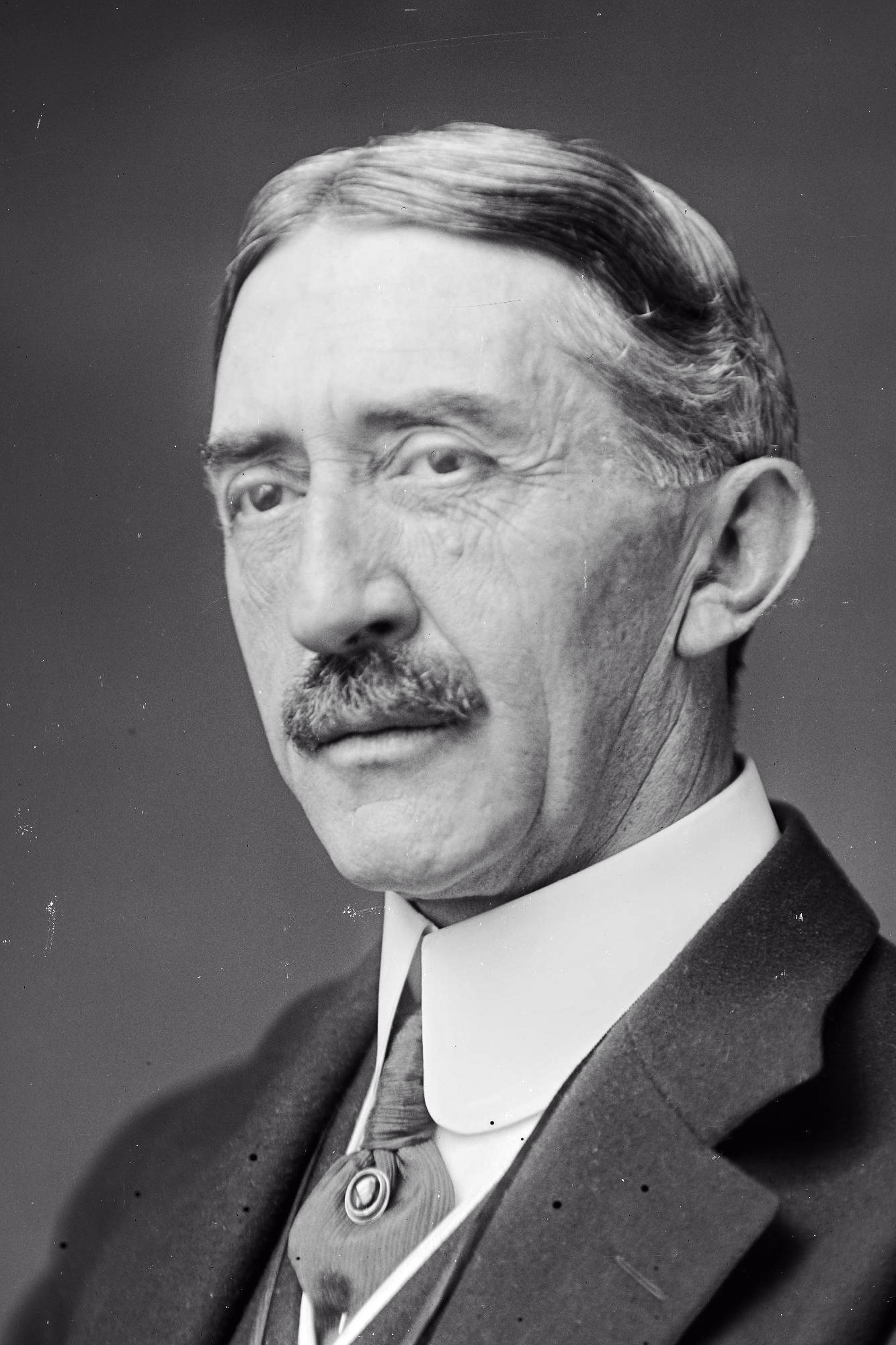
Edwin Alderman was UVA's first president between 1904 and 1931 and instituted many reforms toward modernization.

Jefferson had originally decided the University of Virginia would have no serving president. Rather, this power was to be shared by a rector and the Board of Visitors. But as the 19th century waned, it became obvious this cumbersome arrangement was incapable of adequately handling the many administrative and fundraising tasks of the growing university. Edwin Alderman, who had only recently moved from his post as president of UNC-Chapel Hill since 1896 to become president of Tulane University in 1900, accepted an offer as president of the University of Virginia in 1904. His appointment was not without controversy, and national media such as Popular Science lamented the end of one of the things that made UVA unique among universities.

Alderman stayed 27 years, and became known as a prolific fund-raiser, a well-known orator, and a close adviser to U.S. president and UVA alumnus Woodrow Wilson. He added significantly to the University Hospital to support new sickbeds and public health research, and helped create departments of geology and forestry, the School of Education and Human Development (originally the Curry School of Education), the McIntire School of Commerce, and the summer school programs in which young Georgia O'Keeffe took part. Perhaps his greatest ambition was the funding and construction of a library on a scale of millions of books, much larger than the Rotunda could bear. Delayed by the Great Depression, Alderman Library was named in his honor in 1938. Alderman, who seven years earlier had died in office en route to giving a public speech at the University of Illinois at Urbana–Champaign, is still the longest-tenured president of the university.

In 1904, UVA became the first university south of Washington, D.C. to be elected to the Association of American Universities. After a gift by Andrew Carnegie in 1909 the University of Virginia was organized into twenty-six departments across six schools including the Andrew Carnegie School of Engineering, the James Madison School of Law, the James Monroe School of International Law, the James Wilson School of Political Economy, the Edgar Allan Poe School of English and the Walter Reed School of Pathology. The honorific historical names for these schools – several of which have remained as modern schools of the university – are no longer used.

In December 1953, the University of Virginia joined the Atlantic Coast Conference for athletics. At the time, UVA had a football program that had just broken through to be nationally ranked in 1950, 1951, and 1952, and consistently beat its rivals North Carolina and Virginia Tech by scores such as 34–7 and 44–0. Other sports were very competitive as well. However, the administration of Colgate Darden de-emphasized athletics, defunding the department and declining to join the ACC before being overruled by the Board of Visitors on that decision. It would take until the 1980s for the bulk of athletics programs to fully recover but approaching the year 2000 UVA was again one of the most successful all-around sports programs with NCAA national titles achieved in an array of different sports; by 2020, it had twice won the Capital One Cup for overall athletics excellence in men's sports programs.

UVA established a junior college in 1954, known today as the University of Virginia's College at Wise. George Mason University and Mary Washington University used to similarly exist as UVA's satellite campuses, but those are now wholly independent universities no longer administered by the University of Virginia.

The Academical Village and nearby Monticello became a joint World Heritage Site in 1987. Simultaneously with Hawaiʻi Volcanoes National Park and Chaco Culture National Historical Park, they were the fifteenth, sixteenth, and seventeenth U.S. sites designated as culturally significant to the collective interests of global humanity, coming after the Statue of Liberty and Yosemite National Park three years earlier. As such, UVA possesses the only U.S. collegiate grounds to be internationally protected by the United Nations Educational, Scientific and Cultural Organization (UNESCO).

==== Integration, coeducation, and student dissent ====
The University of Virginia first admitted a few selected women to graduate studies in the late 1890s and to certain programs such as nursing and education in the 1920s and 1930s. In 1944, Mary Washington College in Fredericksburg, Virginia, became the Women's Undergraduate Arts and Sciences Division of the University of Virginia. With this branch campus in Fredericksburg exclusively for women, UVA maintained its main campus in Charlottesville as near-exclusively for men, until a civil rights lawsuit in the 1960s forced it to commingle the sexes. In 1970, the Charlottesville campus became fully co-educational, and in 1972 Mary Washington became an independent state university. When the first female class arrived, 450 undergraduate women entered UVA, comprising 39 percent of undergraduates, while the number of men admitted remained constant. By 1999, women made up a 52 percent majority of the total student body.

The university admitted its first black student when Gregory Swanson sued to gain entrance into the university's law school in 1950. Following his successful lawsuit, a handful of black graduate and professional students were admitted during the 1950s, though no black undergraduates were admitted until 1955, and UVA did not fully integrate until the 1960s. When Walter Ridley graduated with a doctorate in education, he was the first black person to graduate from UVA. UVA's Ridley Scholarship Fund is named in his honor.

The fight for integration and coeducation came to the foreground particularly in the late 1960s, leading up to the May Strike of 1970, in which students protested for higher black enrollment, equal access to UVA admission by undergraduate women, unionization of employees, and against the presence of armed university police and recruiters of government agencies such as the CIA and FBI on Grounds.

=== 21st century ===
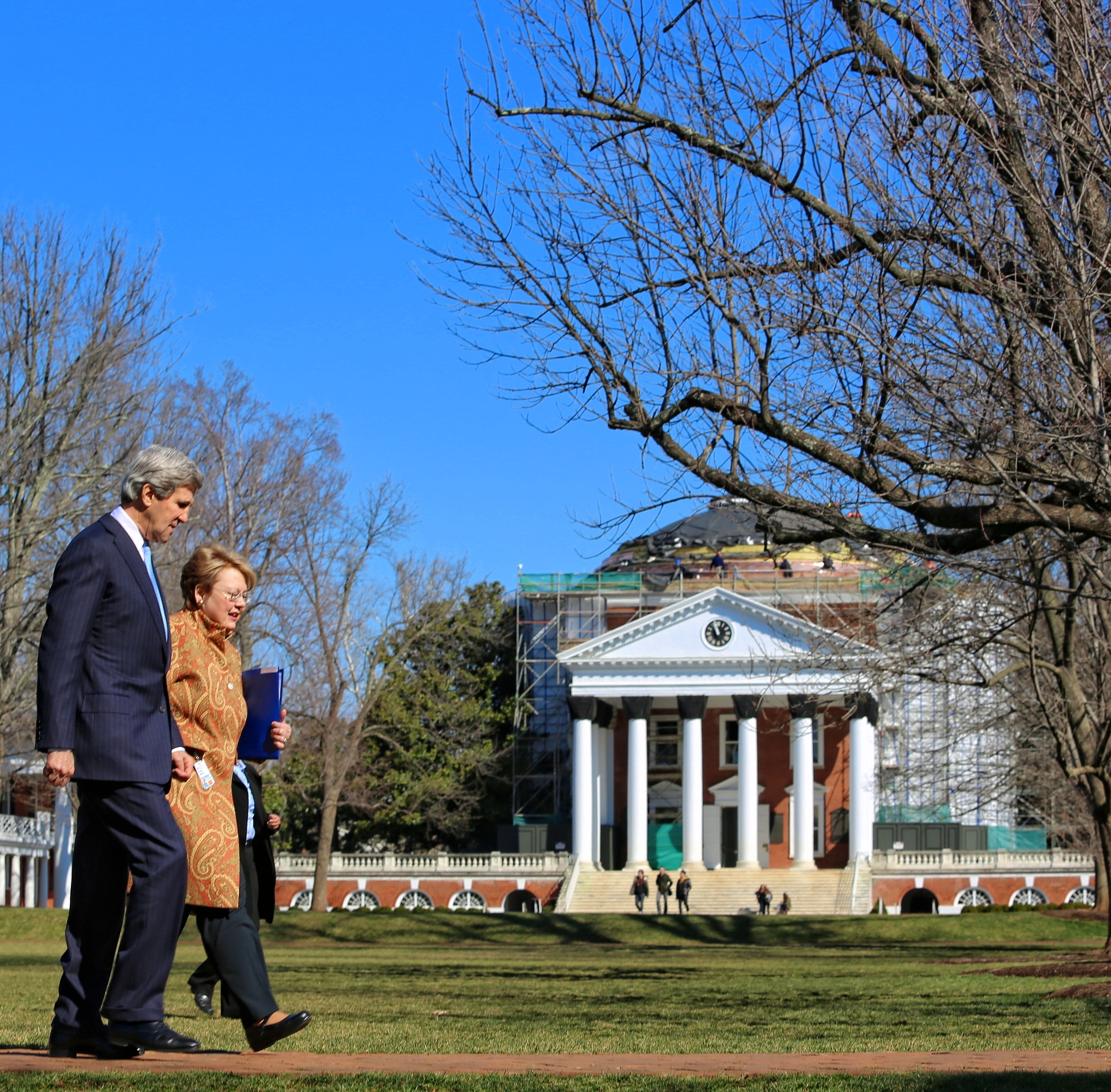
President Sullivan speaking with U.S. Secretary of State John Kerry in front of the Rotunda in February 2013

Due to a continual decline in state funding for the university, today only 6 percent of its budget comes from the Commonwealth of Virginia. A Charter initiative was signed into law by then-Governor Mark Warner in 2005, negotiated with the university to have greater autonomy over its own affairs in exchange for accepting this decline in financial support.

The university welcomed Teresa A. Sullivan as its first female president in 2010. Just two years later its first woman rector, Helen Dragas, engineered a forced-resignation to remove President Sullivan from office. The attempted ouster elicited a faculty Senate vote of no confidence in Rector Dragas, and demands from student government for an explanation. In the face of mounting pressure including alumni threats to cease contributions, and a mandate from then-Governor Robert McDonnell to resolve the issue or face removal of the entire Board of Visitors, the board unanimously reinstated President Sullivan. In 2013 and 2014, the board passed new bylaws that made it harder to remove a president and possible to remove a rector.

In November 2014, the university suspended fraternity and sorority functions pending investigation of an article by Rolling Stone concerning an alleged rape story, which was later determined to be a hoax after the story was confirmed to be false through investigation by The Washington Post. The university nonetheless instituted new rules banning "pre-mixed drinks, punches or any other common source of alcohol" such as beer kegs and requiring "sober and lucid" fraternity members to monitor all parties. In April 2015, Rolling Stone fully retracted the article after the Columbia School of Journalism released a scathing and discrediting report on the "anatomy of a journalistic failure" by its author. Even before release of the Columbia University report, the Rolling Stone story was named the "Error of the Year" by the Poynter Institute. The UVA chapter of Phi Kappa Psi settled a defamation suit against Rolling Stone and received $1.65 million.

In August 2017, the night before the infamous Unite the Right rally, a group of non-student and mostly non-Virginian white nationalists marched on the university's Lawn bearing torches and chanting antisemitic and Nazi slogans after the city of Charlottesville decided to remove all remaining Confederate statues from the city including one depicting Robert E. Lee. They were met by student counter-protesters near the statue of Thomas Jefferson in front of the Rotunda. Unite the Right marchers attacked students, staff and faculty with torches, mace spray, and lighter fluid, causing significant injury. The next day, August 12, the Unite the Right Rally met in downtown Charlottesville in a rally organized in part by UVA alumnus Jason Kessler. President Sullivan discouraged faculty, staff and students from counter-protesting the rally. Many ignored her, including several hit by the car driven by James Alex Fields Jr, a rally participant.

James E. Ryan, a graduate of the University of Virginia School of Law, became the university's ninth president in August 2018. His first act upon his inauguration was to announce that in-state undergraduates from families making less than $80,000 per year would receive full scholarships covering tuition, and those from families making under $30,000 would also receive free room and board. Ryan was previously dean of the Harvard School of Education.

On the night of November 13, 2022, three students were killed and two others injured in a shooting on a charter bus that was returning to the campus from a play for a class trip in Washington, D.C. All three fatalities were current members of the Virginia Cavaliers football team and the alleged shooter was briefly a member of the team during the 2018 season.

In response to increasing pro-Palestinian sentiment within college communities across the US, a group of protestors, which included UVA students, created a peaceful encampment near the Rotunda in May 2024. The University reportedly responded by creating a policy prohibiting camps and tents on Grounds after the encampment started, and using this as grounds to bring in local police. Police attacked and pepper sprayed the protesters, and they were consequently arrested and charged with disciplinary measures by UVA. The university later dropped all disciplinary action against the protesters.

In 2025, the United States Department of Justice called for President Ryan to resign, citing university-wide efforts to stall and misrepresent the dismantling of the University's diversity, equity and inclusion policies. Ryan announced his resignation on June 27, 2025. In October 2025, the university made a deal with the Trump administration, agreeing to "not engage in unlawful racial discrimination in its university programming, admissions, hiring or other activities".

On November 12, 2025, Virginia governor-elect Abigail Spanberger asked the University's board of visitors to pause its search for a new president until she takes office, and could appoint members to the board. Governor Glenn Youngkin and conservative alumni criticized the move as political interference.

== Grounds ==
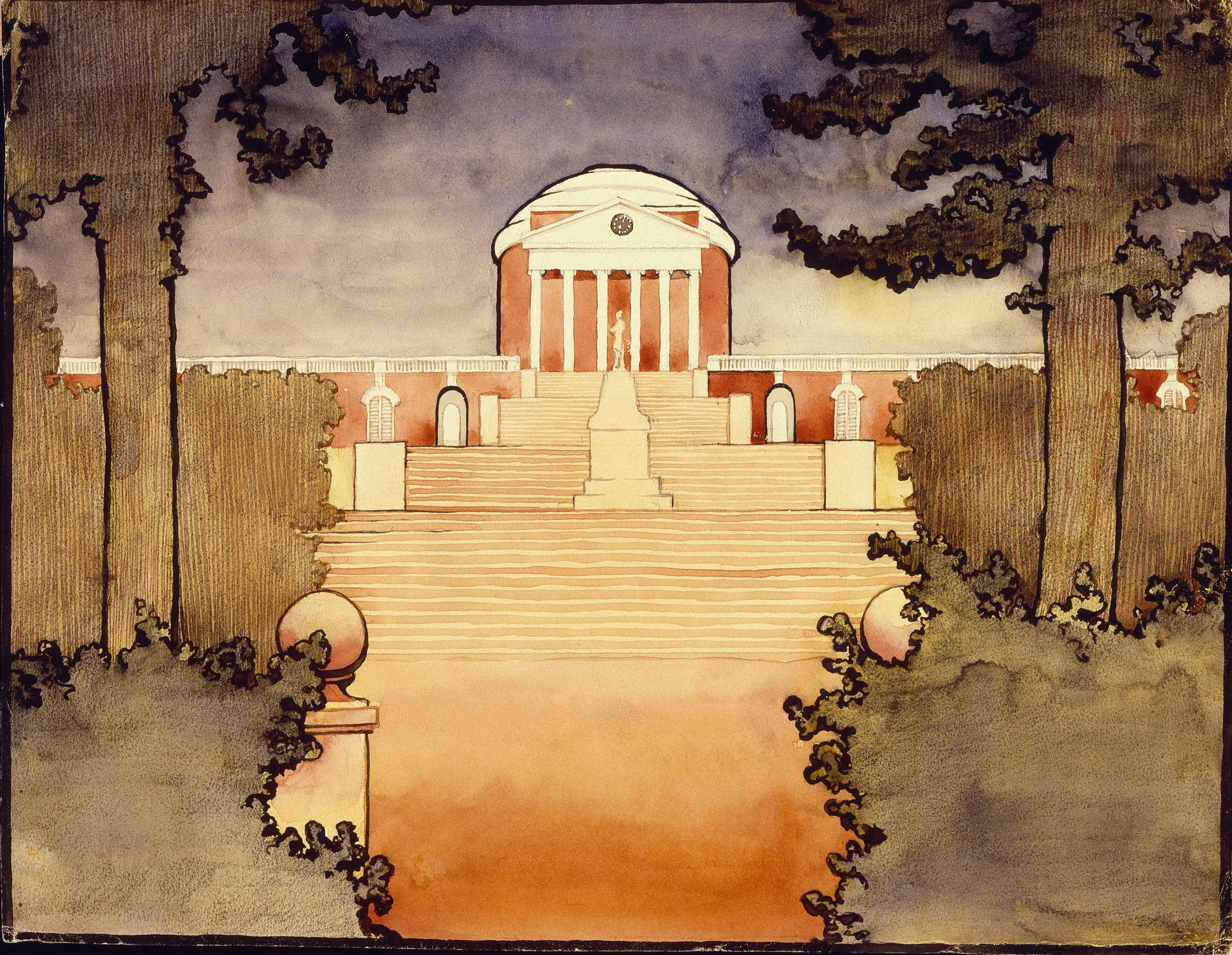
The Rotunda, as painted by American modernist painter Georgia O'Keeffe in the early 1910s when she was a Summer Session student

The University of Virginia campus, referred to as Grounds, straddles the border between the City of Charlottesville and Albemarle County. The university also maintains 562 acres north of the campus at North Fork and 2,913 acres southeast of the city at Morven Farm. It also is in the process of building a campus in Northern Virginia within Fairfax, Virginia.

== Organization and administration ==
The university has several affiliated centers including the Rare Book School, headquarters of the National Radio Astronomy Observatory, University of Virginia Center for Politics, Weldon Cooper Center for Public Service, Sorensen Institute for Political Leadership, Institute for Advanced Studies in Culture, and Miller Center of Public Affairs. The Fralin Museum of Art is dedicated to creating an environment where both the university community and the general public can study and learn from directly experiencing works of different art. The university has its own internal recruiting firm, the Executive Search Group and Strategic Resourcing. Since 2013, this department has been housed under the Office of the President.

In 2006, President Casteen announced an ambitious $3 billion capital campaign to be completed by December 2011. During the Great Recession, President Sullivan missed the 2011 deadline, and extended it indefinitely. The $3 billion goal would be met a year and a half later, which President Sullivan announced at graduation ceremonies in May 2013.

As of 2013, UVA's $1.4 billion academic budget is paid for primarily by tuition and fees (32%), research grants (23%), endowment and gifts (19%), and sales and services (12%). The university receives 10% of its academic funds through state appropriation from the Commonwealth of Virginia. For the overall (including non-academic) university budget of $2.6 billion, 45% comes from medical patient revenue. The Commonwealth contributes less than 6%.

UVA's endowment is among the highest among universities in the United States. As of 2013, the University of Virginia was one of only two public universities in the United States that had a Triple-A credit rating from all three major credit rating agencies.

UVA colleges and schools
College/school	Year founded
School of Architecture	1954
College of Arts & Sciences	1824
Darden School of Business	1954
McIntire School of Commerce	1921
School of Continuing and Professional Studies	1915
School of Data Science	2019
School of Education and Human Development	1905
School of Engineering and Applied Science	1836
School of Law	1819
Frank Batten School of Leadership and Public Policy	2007
School of Medicine	1819
School of Nursing	1901

Although UVA is the flagship university of Virginia, state funding has decreased for several consecutive decades. Financial support from the state dropped by half from 12 percent of total revenue in 2001–02 to six percent in 2013–14. The portion of academic revenue coming from the state fell by even more in the same period, from 22 percent to just nine percent. This nominal support from the state, contributing just $154 million of UVA's $2.6 billion budget in 2012–13, has led President Sullivan and others to contemplate the partial privatization of the University of Virginia. UVA's Darden School and Law School are already self-sufficient. Hunter R. Rawlings III, President of the prominent Association of American Universities research group of universities, came to Charlottesville to make a speech to university faculty which included a statement about the proposal: "there's no possibility, as far as I can see, that any state will ever relinquish its ownership and governance of its public universities, much less of its flagship research university". He encouraged university leaders to stop talking about privatization and instead push their state lawmakers to increase funding for higher education and research as a public good.

== Academics ==
The University of Virginia offers over 70 bachelor's degree programs, 94 master's degree programs, 55 doctoral degree programs, 6 educational specialist degree programs, and 2 first-professional degrees (Medicine and Law). UVA does not bestow honorary degrees.

=== Scholarships ===
The Jefferson Scholarship is a competitive merit scholarship. Around 30 scholars are selected annually from a direct application pool of 4,500 nominating schools, each able to nominate only one student. Covering all tuition, books, room and board, the scholarship also provides scholars finances for summer enrichment, independent research and study abroad.

Echols Scholars (College of Arts and Sciences) and Rodman Scholars (School of Engineering and Applied Science), which include 5% of undergraduate students, receive no financial benefits, but are entitled to special advisors, priority course registration, residence in designated dorms and fewer curricular constraints than other students have.

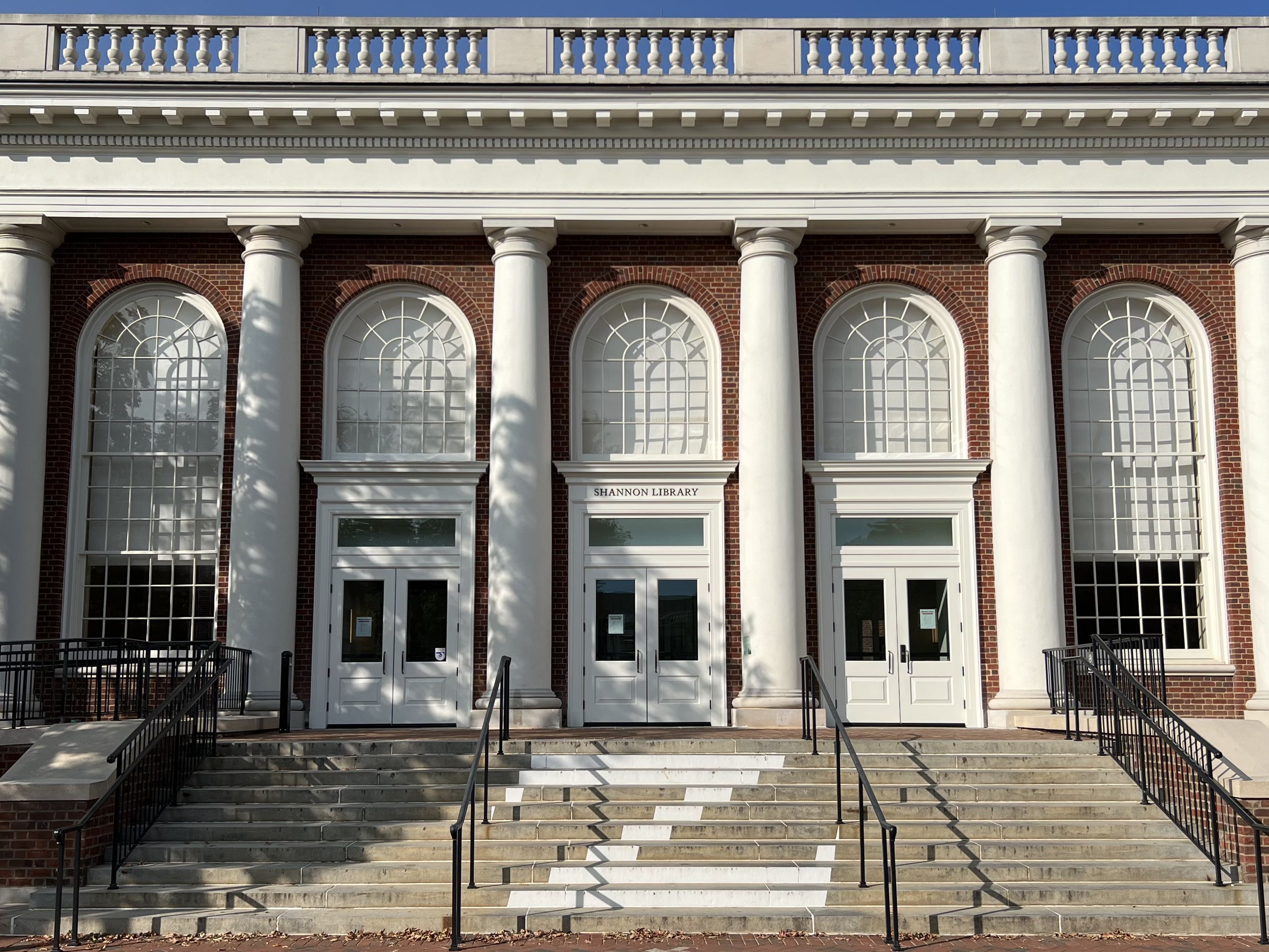
Shannon Library is home to 1.7 million books. It is one of eleven libraries at UVA, and hosts one-third of the 1.9 million visitors to the system each year as of 2018.

Full tuition scholarships are given to each in-state student from families earning under $100,000 per year. Each in-state student from families earning under $50,000 per year also receives free room and board. These scholarships are initiatives of President Ryan, who announced them upon his inauguration in 2018.

=== Research ===
The University of Virginia is the first and longest serving public member of the Association of American Universities in the American South, attaining membership in 1904. It is classified among "R1: Doctoral Universities – Very high research activity".

According to the National Science Foundation, UVA spent $614 million on research and development in 2019, ranking it 44th in the nation and first in Virginia. Built in 1996, North Fork (formerly the UVA Research Park) is an extensive 3.7-million square foot, 562 acre research park nine miles north of UVA's North Grounds. It houses the UVA Applied Research Institute as well as many private R&D efforts by such firms as Battelle, The MITRE Corporation, Signature Science, and CACI.

UVA is also home to globally recognized research on hypersonic flight for NASA and other organizations. The United States Air Force, National Science Foundation, and National Center for Hypersonic Combined Cycle Propulsion have each also granted UVA researchers millions in funding for the university's ongoing broad and deep research into ultra-high velocity flight. Starting in 2015, a UVA team led by mechanical engineering professor Eric Loth began Department of Energy-funded research into an original design of offshore wind turbines that would potentially dwarf the size and scope of any being produced or researched anywhere else. The innovative design inspired by palm trees led to Loth being named to a Popular Science list of "The Brilliant Minds Behind The New Energy Revolution".

UVA was recognized by Science as leading two of the top 10 scientific discoveries in the world in 2015. The first breakthrough was when UVA School of Medicine researchers Jonathan Kipnis and Antoine Louveau discovered previously unknown vessels connecting the human brain directly to the lymphatic system. The second breakthrough was when UVA psychology professor Brian Nosek examined the reproducibility of 100 psychology studies and found fewer than half could be reproduced. More than 270 researchers on five continents were involved, and twenty-two students and faculty from UVA were listed as co-authors on the scientific paper.

In the field of astrophysics, the university is a member of a consortium engaged in the construction and operation of the Large Binocular Telescope in the Mount Graham International Observatory of the Pinaleno Mountains of southeastern Arizona. It is also a member of both the Astrophysical Research Consortium, which operates telescopes at Apache Point Observatory in New Mexico, and the Association of Universities for Research in Astronomy which operates the National Optical Astronomy Observatory, the Gemini Observatory and the Space Telescope Science Institute. The University of Virginia hosts the headquarters of the National Radio Astronomy Observatory, which operates the Green Bank Telescope in West Virginia and the Very Large Array radio telescope made famous in the Carl Sagan television documentary Cosmos and film Contact. The North American Atacama Large Millimeter Array Science Center is also at the Charlottesville NRAO site. In 2019, researchers at NRAO co-authored a study documenting the discovery of a pair of giant hourglass shaped balloons emanating radio waves from the center of our Milky Way galaxy.

=== Rankings ===
Academic rankings

National
- Forbes: 34
- U.S. News & World Report: 26
- Washington Monthly: 113
- WSJ/College Pulse: 33

Global
- ARWU: 201–300
- QS: 275
- THE: 166 (tie)
- U.S. News & World Report: 137 (tie)

As of the 2026 rankings, U.S. News & World Report ranks UVA's undergraduate programs 26th among national universities overall, tied with University of North Carolina Chapel Hill. Its undergraduate business school, McIntire, is ranked 2nd (and 1st among public universities) in the United States by the UK-based business school website Poets & Quants as of 2026. In its (most recent as of 2024) undergraduate business school rankings of 2016, Bloomberg BusinessWeek ranked the McIntire School of Commerce, UVA's undergraduate business program, 5th overall and 2nd among public universities. In its 2024 ranking, Bloomberg.com ranks UVA as the #3 business school in the nation and 1st among public universities.

U.S. News & World Report's 2024 rankings placed its law school fourth-best overall and 1st among public universities, its graduate Darden School of Business 10th nationally, the medical school 30th overall in the "Research" category, and the engineering school tied for 37th overall. The School of Education was ranked 8th in the nation. The specialization in special education, as well as in curriculum and instruction, were both ranked 4th in the nation. In the 2022 Academic Ranking of World Universities, the School of Education was ranked 8th in the world.

Washington Monthly ranked UVA 113th in its 2025 national ranking of universities based on its contribution to the public good, as measured by social mobility, research, and promoting good public service.

=== Other recognition ===
UVA was ranked 1st by the Foundation for Individual Rights and Expression in the 2025 Free Speech College Rankings, improving from a #6 ranking in 2024.

The University of Virginia has also been recognized for consistently having the highest African American graduation rate among national public universities. According to the Fall 2005 issue of Journal of Blacks in Higher Education, UVA "has the highest black student graduation rate of the Public Ivies" and "by far the most impressive is the University of Virginia with its high black student graduation rate and its small racial difference in graduation rates."

=== Undergraduate admissions and financial aid ===
Undergraduate admissions statistics
- 2025 entering class
- Admit rate: 15.3% (▼ −12.7)
- Yield rate: 39.1% (▲ +1)

Test scores middle 50%
- SAT Total: 1400-1540 (among 51% of FTFs)
- ACT Composite: 32-35 (among 21% of FTFs)

For the undergraduate Class of 2027, the University of Virginia received a record 56,439 applications, admitting 16.2 percent. The early action acceptance rate was 27 percent for in-state Virginians and 12 percent for out-of-state applicants. The regular decision acceptance rate was 13 percent for in-state Virginians and 8 percent for out-of-state applicants. UVA is required, by Virginia state law, to matriculate two-thirds of its undergraduate student body from its pool of in-state applicants; it is barred, by Virginia state law, from giving admissions preference to the children of its alumni. Approximately 40 percent of those admitted to UVA are non-white. Matriculated students come from all 50 states and 147 foreign countries. The university has seen steady increases to its applicant pool in recent decades, and the number of applications has more than tripled since the Class of 2008 received 15,094 applications. Admission to the university is among the most selective in the United States among public universities. As of 2014, 93 percent of admitted applicants ranked in the top 10 percent of their high school classes. For the Class of 2027, some 1,167 students were accepted after having had their application fees waived as either low-income or first-generation college students.

Admission is need-blind for domestic applicants. President James Ryan announced at his inauguration in fall 2018 that in-state students from families earning less than $80,000 a year will receive full tuition scholarships. Those from families earning less than $30,000 will also receive free room and board. The university already met 100 percent of demonstrated need for all admitted undergraduate students, making it one of only two public universities in the U.S. to reach this level of financial aid for its students. For 2014, the university ranked fourth overall by the Princeton Review for "Great Financial Aid". In 2008 the Center for College Affordability and Productivity named UVA the top value among all national public colleges and universities; and in 2009, UVA was again named the "No. 1 Best Value" among public universities in the United States in a separate ranking by USA TODAY and the Princeton Review. Kiplinger in 2014 ranked UVA second out of the top 100 best-value public colleges and universities in the nation.

Graduate and professional school admissions are also highly selective. As of 2024, the average LSAT score was 172 at the School of Law, while at the Darden School of Business the average GMAT score was 718.

== Student life ==
Undergraduate demographics as of Fall 2023
Race and ethnicity	Total
White	50%
Asian	19%
Black	8%
Hispanic	7%
Two or more races	6%
International student	5%
Unknown	5%
Economic diversity
Low-income (Note: The percentage of students who received an income-based federal Pell grant intended for low-income students.)	14%
Affluent (Note: The percentage of students who are a part of the American middle class at the bare minimum.)	86%

Student life at the University of Virginia is marked by a number of unique traditions. The campus of the university is referred to as the "Grounds". Freshmen, sophomores, juniors, and seniors are instead called first-, second-, third-, and fourth-years to reflect Jefferson's belief that learning is a lifelong process, rather than one to be completed within four years.

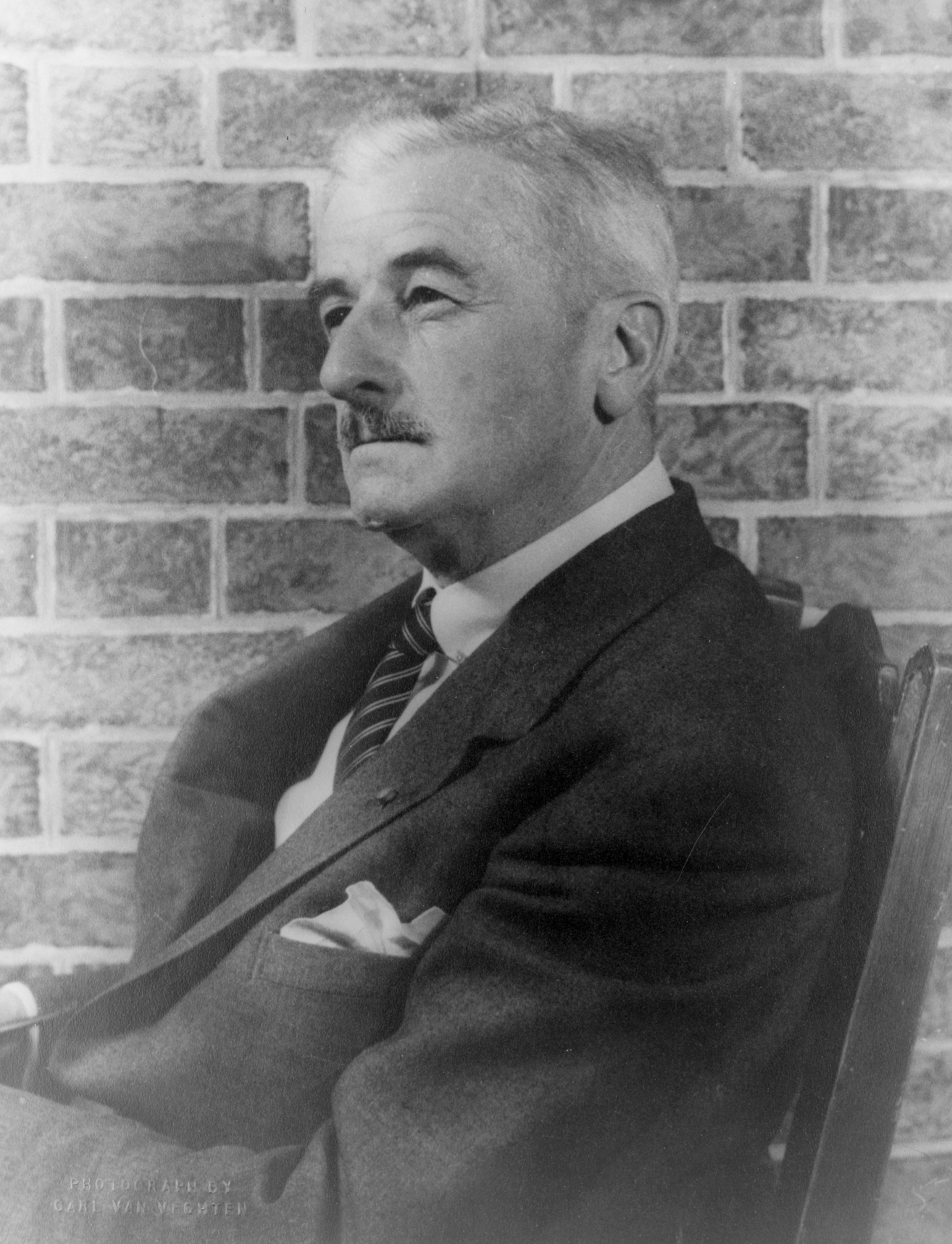
William Faulkner once lived among the students of UVA after winning the Nobel Prize for Literature, and bequeathed most of his papers to Shannon Library.

=== Student-faculty interaction and connections ===
First-year students in the College of Arts & Sciences are required to take four Engagements, two per semester, with the goal of students expanding their thinking. However, students who are part of UVA's distinguished honors college, Echols, are exempt from the College of Arts & Sciences general education requirements. Therefore, Echols scholars do not have to take the four Engagements.

Select faculty live at Brown College at Monroe Hill, Hereford College, International Residential College, and in Pavilions on the Lawn. This living arrangement gives more opportunities for professors to invite students to lunches and dinners, which regularly happens, and creates chances for impromptu meetings and interactions between faculty and students around Grounds.

Reflecting this close student-faculty interaction at UVA, it welcomed Nobel laureate William Faulkner to a position as "writer-in-residence" in 1957. He had no teaching responsibilities, and was paid merely to live among the students and write. He was badly injured in a horse riding accident in 1959, and did not return to the state before his death in 1962. Faulkner then bequeathed the majority of his papers to Shannon Library, giving UVA the largest Faulkner archives in the world.

=== Global citizenship initiatives ===
UVA was previously the academic sponsor for Semester at Sea, a multi-country study abroad program conducted on a cruise ship.

The University of Virginia received the 2015 Paul Simon Award for Comprehensive Internationalization, by the Association of International Educators. This award confirms the university's success and commitment in educating its students on a global scale as well as nationally.

In the fall of 2019, UVA started the Global Internships Program as part of their commitment to "high-impact educational experiences" and "global experiences", strategies outlined in UVA's Cornerstone Plan.

=== Student leadership opportunities ===
There are a number of UVA undergraduate leadership opportunities that are offered in addition to the standard student government or fraternity and sorority positions found at many other universities. They include UVA's secret societies and debating societies, the student-run honor committees, and the chance to be recognized as a fourth-year student at the pinnacle of student leadership by being asked to live on the Lawn.

The Frank Batten School of Leadership and Public Policy, established in 2007, expands on these unique student leadership opportunities to study Leadership itself as a cross-disciplinary subject of focus and is closely aligned with many of the university's schools, including the Architecture, Education, Engineering, Law, Medical, and Darden schools, as well as with programs in politics, economics, and applied ethics.

The University of Virginia has a long history of student activists who formed radical environmental, religious, and political groups to champion various social changes. An especially intense period of student activism occurred in the 1970s during the May Days strikes against the Vietnam War. More recently, the School of Education and Human Development and its Youth-Nex Center held a national conference in 2019 to promote student activism at UVA and beyond.

=== Secret societies ===
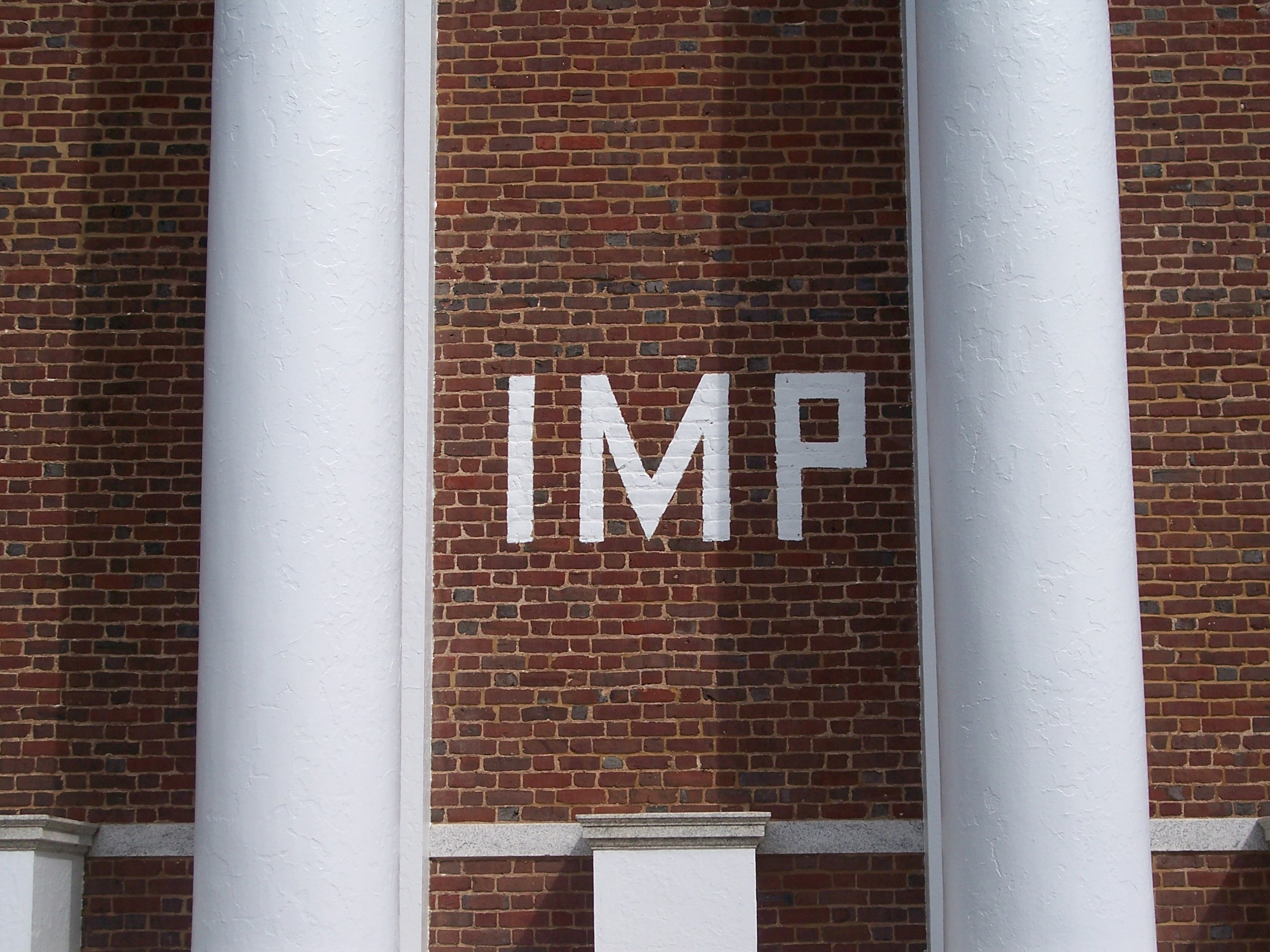
The mark of one out of many secret societies active on Grounds at the university

Student societies have existed on Grounds since the early twentieth century. Secret societies have been a part of University of Virginia student life since the first class of students in 1825. While the number of societies peaked during the 75-year period between 1875 and 1950, there are still six societies active that are over 100 years old, and several newer secret societies.

=== Honor system ===
Honor Pledge

I will not lie, cheat, or steal.

The nation's first codified honor system was instituted by UVA law professor Henry St. George Tucker, Sr. in 1842, after a fellow professor was shot to death on the Lawn. There are three tenets to the system: students simply must not lie, cheat, or steal. For its first 180 years it was a "single sanction system", meaning that committing any of these three offenses would result in immediate expulsion from the university. In the spring of 2022, following decades of criticism and waning support, a proposal to replace the penalty of expulsion with a two-semester suspension passed a student referendum with over 80% of the vote and took effect immediately.

The honor system is intended to be student-run and student-administered. If accused, students are tried before their peers—fellow students, never faculty, serve as counsel and jury. Although Honor Committee resources have been strained by mass cheating scandals such as a case in 2001 of 122 suspected cheaters over several years in a single large Physics survey course, and federal lawsuits have challenged the system, its verdicts are rarely overturned. There is only one documented case of direct UVA administration interference in an honor system proceeding: the trial and subsequent retrial of student Christopher Leggett.

=== Student activities ===
Many events take place at the University of Virginia, on the Lawn and across Grounds. One of the largest events at UVA is Springfest, hosted by the University Programs Council. It takes place every year in the spring, and features a large free concert, various inflatables, games. Another popular event and tradition is Lighting of the Lawn in the winter. Established in 2001 as a tribute to the September 11 attacks, Lighting of the Lawn consists of a light and music show on the Lawn. Another popular event is Foxfield, a steeplechase and social gathering that takes place nearby in Albemarle County in April, and which is annually attended by thousands of students from the University of Virginia, neighboring colleges, and local residents.

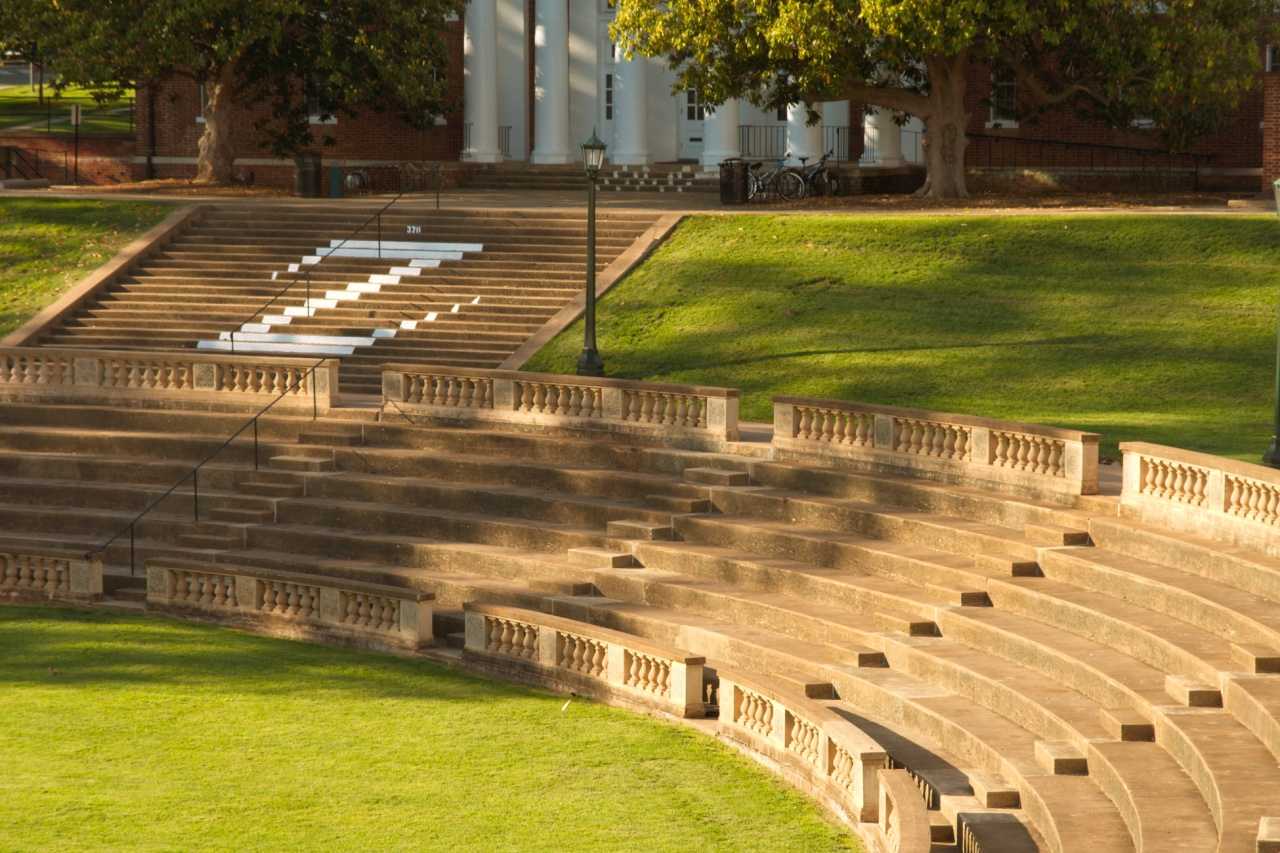
The University Amphitheater is often used for outdoor lectures and student gatherings.

The student life building is called Newcomb Hall. It is home to the Student Activities Center (SAC) and the Media Activities Center (MAC), where student groups can get leadership consulting and use computing and copying resources. It also features several meeting rooms for student groups. Student Council, the student self-governing body, holds meetings Tuesdays at 6:30 p.m. in the Newcomb South Meeting Room. Student Council, or "StudCo", also holds office hours and regular committee meetings in the newly renovated Newcomb Programs and Council (PAC) Room. The PAC also houses the University Programs Council and Class Councils. Newcomb basement is home to both the office of the independent student newspaper The Declaration, The Cavalier Daily, and the Consortium of University Publications.

In 2005, the university was named "Hottest for Fitness" by Newsweek magazine, due in part to 94% of its students using one of the four indoor athletics facilities. Particularly popular is the Aquatics and Fitness Center, across the street from the Alderman Dorms. The University of Virginia sent more workers to the Peace Corps in 2006 and 2008 than any other "medium-sized" university in the United States. Volunteerism at the university is centered around Madison House which offers numerous opportunities to serve others. Among the numerous programs offered are tutoring, housing improvement, an organization called Hoos Against Hunger, which gives leftover food from restaurants to the homeless of Charlottesville rather than allowing it to be discarded, among numerous other volunteer programs. Many students also choose to volunteer as emergency responders, the most common stations being Charlottesville Albemarle Rescue Squad (CARS) in the city of Charlottesville and Seminole Trail Volunteer Fire Department (STVFD) in Albemarle County.

As at many universities, alcohol use is a part of the social life of many undergraduate students. In 2005, concerns particularly arose about fourth-years consuming excessive alcohol during the day of the last home football game. This tradition is called "Fourth Year Fifth" by a majority of the student body. President Casteen then announced a $2.5 million donation from Anheuser-Busch to fund a new UVA-based Social Norms Institute in September 2006. A spokesman said: "the goal is to get students to emulate the positive behavior of the vast majority of students". On the other hand, the university was ranked first in Playboy's 2012 list of Top 10 Party Schools based on ratings of sex, sports, and nightlife.

=== Fraternities and sororities ===
The University of Virginia has a number of fraternities and sororities on campus, encompassing the traditional social fraternities and sororities as well as coeducational professional, service, and honor fraternities. Social life at the university was originally dominated by debating societies. The first fraternity chapter founded at UVA was Delta Kappa Epsilon in 1852, and it was quickly followed by many more; the University of Virginia was the birthplace of two national fraternities, Kappa Sigma and Pi Kappa Alpha, which exist at the university as of 2023. However, both organizations are no longer recognized by the University of Virginia as of 2024, after their Fraternal Organization Agreements were terminated due to violations of University policies related to hazing.

Through the twentieth century, the roles of these organizations on campus expanded to encompass social sororities, professional fraternities and sororities, service fraternities, honor societies, black fraternities and sororities, and multicultural fraternities and sororities. Roughly 30% of the student body are members of social fraternities and sororities, while additional students are involved with service, professional, and honor fraternities. "Rush and pledging" occur in the spring semester for most Greek organizations. Trigon Engineering Society holds a reserved room on the Lawn. Kappa Sigma and Pi Kappa Alpha fraternities once held reserved rooms on the Lawn and Range, respectively; however, upon termination of their relationships with the University, both rooms were unendowed.

=== Transportation ===
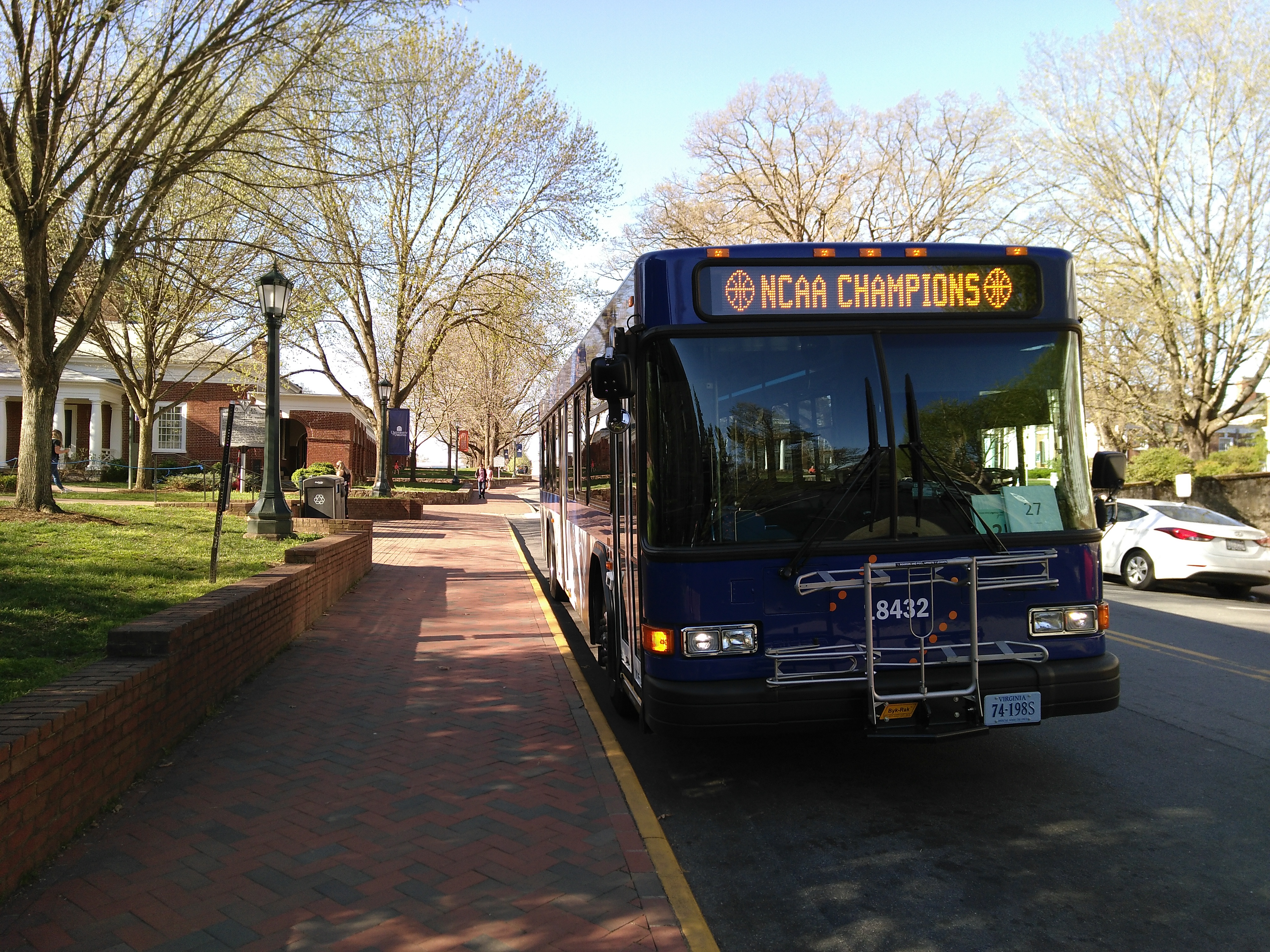
Northline Express (NLX) bus of the University Transit Service, with signage celebrating victory at the 2019 NCAA tournament championship (March Madness)

A set of bus lines operated by the university's University Transit Service connect different parts of the UVA Grounds with adjacent parking facilities. This is complemented by a set of bus lines operated by Charlottesville Area Transit that connect the University of Virginia with other parts of Charlottesville. The Virginia Department of Transportation maintains the roads through the university grounds as State Route 302.

== Athletics ==
Virginia has ranked near the top of collegiate athletics programs in recent years. In 2015 and 2019, UVA won the nationwide Capital One Cup for overall men's sports excellence. The teams and athletes representing Virginia in college athletics have been dubbed the Cavaliers since 1923, predating the NBA's Cleveland Cavaliers by nearly half a century.

In 2019, Virginia men's basketball won the NCAA Championship in March Madness, the single-elimination national college basketball tournament considered by YouGov polled American viewers (as of the same year) to be the most exciting collegiate sporting event. In 2015, when Virginia first won its first Capital One Cup its teams won the 2014 College Cup, the 2015 College World Series, and the 2015 NCAA Tennis Championships. When it repeated the feat in 2019, the program won both the March Madness tournament and the 2019 Men's Lacrosse Championship.

Virginia's athletics director is Carla Williams, the first African American woman to hold the position at any power conference university. The previous athletics director was Craig Littlepage, the first African American to have that title in the ACC. He held the position for sixteen years and, under his leadership, UVA added many significant hires who have demonstrated success near the top of their respective sports, including recent NCAA Champions Tony Bennett, Lars Tiffany, Brian O'Connor, and Todd DeSorbo, as well as former football coach Bronco Mendenhall. Among coaches who have longer tenures, George Gelnovatch has won two NCAA men's soccer national titles since 2009. Steve Swanson has led women's soccer teams to six ACC titles and 24 consecutive winning seasons. Kevin Sauer has led UVA women's rowing to two NCAA titles since 2010.

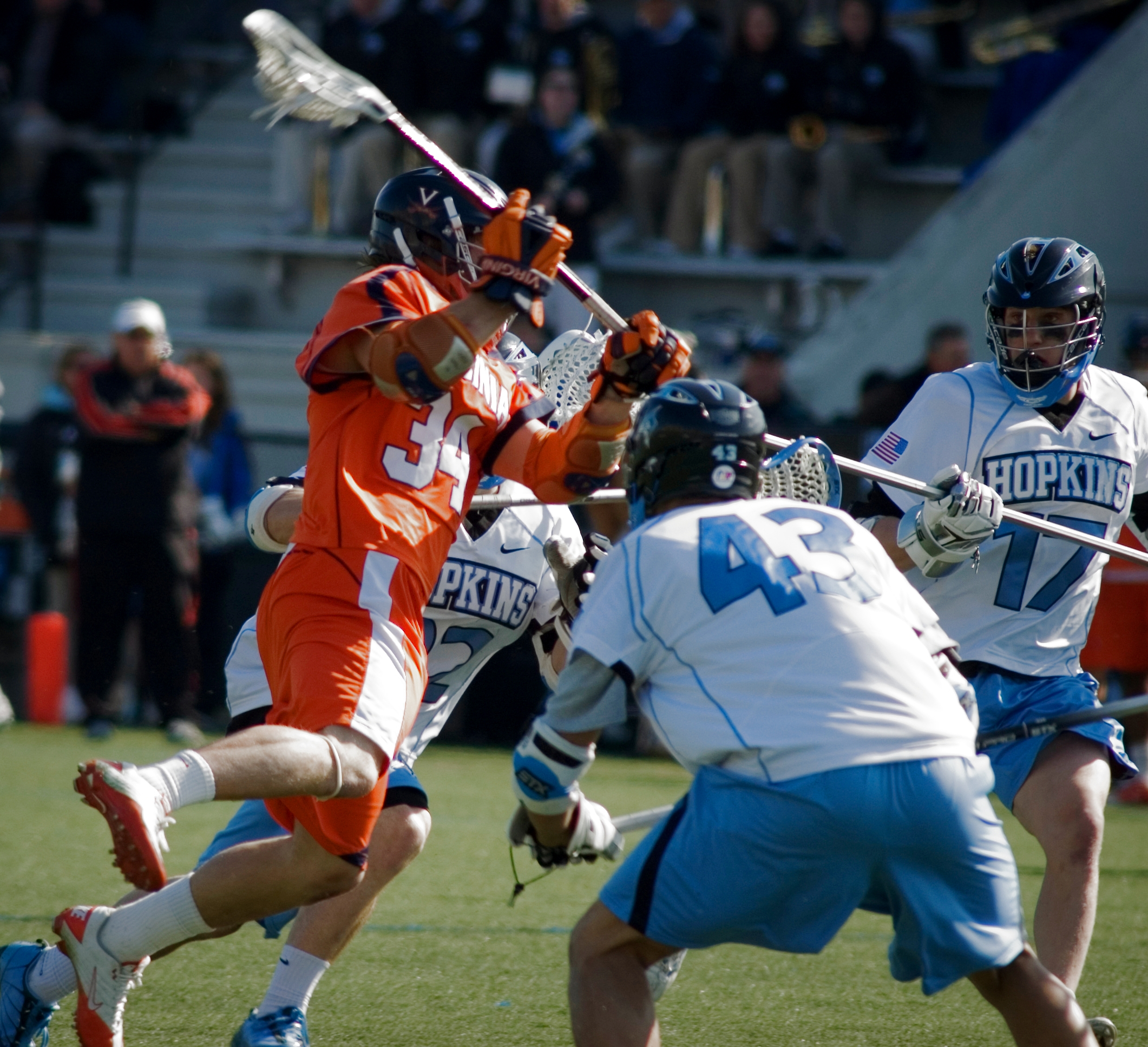
UVA lacrosse has won 11 national championships, including nine national titles since NCAA oversight began.

=== Championships ===
In the 21st century alone, UVA teams have won 22 NCAA championships. The men's teams have won NCAA titles in basketball (2019); lacrosse (2003, 2006, 2011, 2019, and 2021); baseball (2015); soccer (2009 and 2014); and tennis (2013, 2015, 2016, 2017, 2022, and 2023). UVA women have won recent NCAA titles in rowing (2010 and 2012) and swimming & diving (2021, 2022, 2023, 2024, and 2025). The Cavaliers rank first in the ACC (a power conference) with 23 men's NCAA Championships, and rank second in the conference with 11 women's NCAA Championships.

Under Tony Bennett the Cavaliers experienced a basketball renaissance, winning the 2019 NCAA Championship, winning the ACC tournaments of 2014 (over Duke) and 2018 (over North Carolina), and winning regular-season championships in 2014, 2015, 2018, and 2019. UVA became the third program in ACC history to win 30 or more games in consecutive seasons and John Paul Jones Arena is considered one of the more intimidating trips for opposing teams to make. The women's basketball program fell just short of its own NCAA Championship in 1990, losing the Championship Game in overtime.

The Virginia men's and women's lacrosse programs are two of the most dominant in the history of the sport, winning ten of UVA's twenty-nine NCAA Championships between them and two more (for a total of 11 recognized national championships) before NCAA oversight began. 2019 and 2021 NCAA champion men's head coach Lars Tiffany has brought UVA back to prominence after Dom Starsia retired as the all-time ACC leader in men's lacrosse wins. All three UVA head coaches in the position prior to Tiffany still rank (as of 2019) in the top 20 of career wins. Three-time NCAA champion head coach Julie Myers leads women's lacrosse. Under her guidance, Virginia is the only program to qualify for 24 straight NCAA tournament berths as of 2019.

The Cavalier baseball team under Brian O'Connor has also experienced tremendous success. UVA finished as national runners-up in the 2014 College World Series and came back to win the 2015 College World Series. Virginia has hosted five NCAA Super Regional tournament events at Davenport Field.

The UVA men's tennis program won "three-peat" NCAA Championships in 2015–2017 after winning the Cavaliers' first in 2013. The team won back-to-back championships in 2022 and 2023. The program has regularly featured international talent combined with locally grown high school tennis talent from Virginia (often Northern Virginia).

The UVA pickleball team won the 2023 DUPR National Championships in Atlanta, Georgia. The Cavaliers were awarded $15,000 for winning the championship. After the tournament, UVA pickleball signed a historic multi-year sponsorship deal with HEAD USA, marking the largest partnership in collegiate pickleball to date.

The University of Virginia women's cross country team won the 1981 and 1982 NCAA Women's Division I Cross Country Championship, as well as the DI Indoor Championships.

The women's swimming and diving team won its first NCAA Championship in 2021. The women repeated the feat in 2022, 2023, 2024, 2025, and 2026.

=== Rivalries ===
Official ACC designated rivalry games include the Virginia–Virginia Tech rivalry and the Virginia–Louisville series. These two rivalries are guaranteed an annual game in all sports, and a home-and-away series in men's and women's basketball. The Cavaliers competed against the Hokies in the Commonwealth Challenge and more recently competed in the Commonwealth Clash, under new rules, for many sports in which they compete head-to-head. The Cavaliers went 2–0 against the Hokies in the Challenge and 3–2 in the Clash (5–2 overall). Perhaps the two most significant rivalry games played between the Cavaliers and Hokies were both in men's basketball, in March 2007 and January 2019. In the former, the two teams met with identical 10–4 ACC records and the winner would clinch a share of the regular-season conference championship. UVA won the game 69–56 and took their fifth of 11 ACC titles. In the latter, No. 4 UVA beat No. 9 Virginia Tech 81–59 in the only game between two AP Top 10 teams in the rivalry's history.

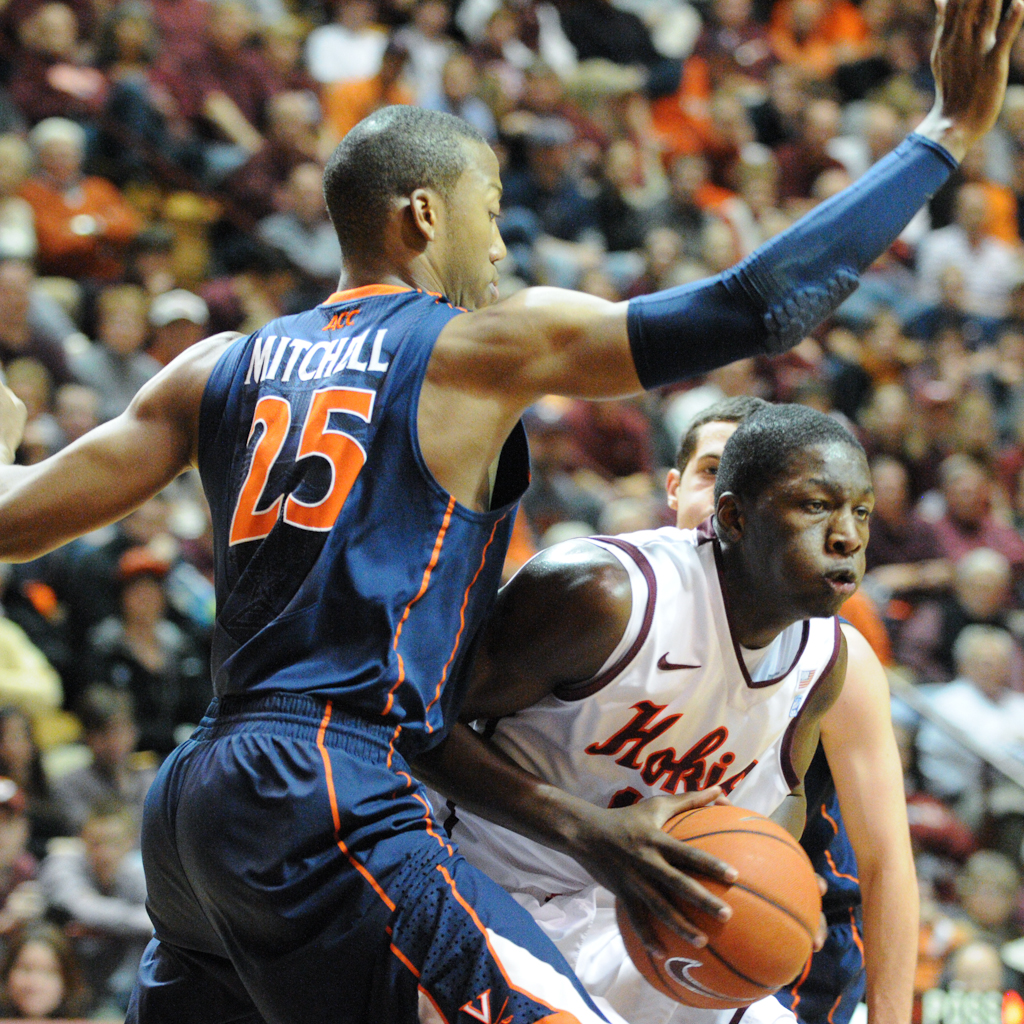
UVA's Akil Mitchell defends Virginia Tech's Cadarian Raines in 2012 at Blacksburg.

The ACC is often regarded as the best college basketball conference, and UVA leads the series in its official yearly home-and-away ACC basketball rivalries: against Virginia Tech 99–61, and against Louisville 23–7, as of 2025. Other basketball rivalries include those against North Carolina and Maryland. Notably the 1982 ACC tournament championship game where Dean Smith had his team of future NBA stars (such as Michael Jordan and James Worthy) hold the ball for seven minutes, against a Virginia team featuring Ralph Sampson, led to the advent of the shot clock and the three-point line. The Maryland rivalry is now mostly dormant, but was reignited in 2014 and 2018 for the ACC–Big Ten Challenge, as well as 2025, with UVA winning all three games.

Virginia men's lacrosse, as one of the all-time great NCAA programs, has a championship rivalry with fellow ACC program Syracuse (the Cavaliers and Orange holding 18 NCAA Championships between them) as well as rivalries against Big Ten programs Johns Hopkins and Maryland. The Syracuse and Johns Hopkins rivalries are played out at least once each season (Syracuse played twice in 2021) with the teams often finding themselves facing off a second or third time in the ACC and NCAA tournaments. Virginia women's lacrosse, also a multi-NCAA Championship program, maintains several of those same rivalries.

The Virginia football team competes against North Carolina in the South's Oldest Rivalry, a historic football rivalry game which a sitting President of the United States, Calvin Coolidge, made time to attend in Charlottesville in 1924. The 1960s and 1970s were particularly dark decades for the football program, which later experienced a resurgence in the 1980s and 1990s under George Welsh. Coach Welsh led the program to its first bowl bids starting with the 1984 Peach Bowl. Welsh, who even reached AP No. 1 rankings for Virginia in October 1990, is a member of the College Football Hall of Fame after compiling the second-most wins in ACC history after Bobby Bowden. In a historic rivalry between two legendary coaches, Welsh finished two games up in the head-to-head series against Virginia Tech coach Frank Beamer, 8–6. He was also dominant against UNC in the South's Oldest Rivalry, finishing 13–5–1, including a perfect 10–0 record against North Carolina at Scott Stadium.

=== Sponsorship ===
In 2015, the Cavaliers negotiated a 10-year sponsorship deal with Nike, from which the program receives $3.5 million per year.

== People ==
=== Faculty ===
Faculty were originally housed in the Academical Village among the students, serving as both instructors and advisors, continuing on to include the McCormick Road Old Dorms, though this has been phased out in favor of undergraduate student resident advisors (RAs). Several of the faculty, however, continue the university tradition of living on Grounds, either on the Lawn in the various Pavilions, or as fellows at one of three residential colleges (Brown College at Monroe Hill, Hereford College, and the International Residential College).

The university's faculty includes a National Humanities Medal and National Medal of Arts winner and former United States Poet Laureate, an awardee of the Order of Isabella the Catholic, 25 Guggenheim fellows, 26 Fulbright fellows, six National Endowment for the Humanities fellows, two Presidential Young Investigator Award winners, three Sloan award winners, three Packard Foundation Award winners, and a winner of the 2005 Nobel Prize in Physiology or Medicine. Physics professor James McCarthy was the lead academic liaison to the government in the establishment of Suranet, and the university has also participated in ARPANET, Abilene, Internet2, and Lambda Rail. On March 19, 1986, the university's domain name, VIRGINIA.EDU, became the first registration under the .edu top-level domain originating from the Commonwealth of Virginia on what would become the World Wide Web.

Larry Sabato has, according to The Wall Street Journal and The Washington Post, become the most-cited professor in the country by national and regional news organizations, both on the Internet and in print. Civil rights activist Julian Bond, a professor in the Corcoran Department of History from 1990 to 2012, was the chairman of the NAACP from 1998 to 2009 and was chosen to host the Nobel Laureates conference in 1998.

Notable current and former UVA faculty and staff in residence

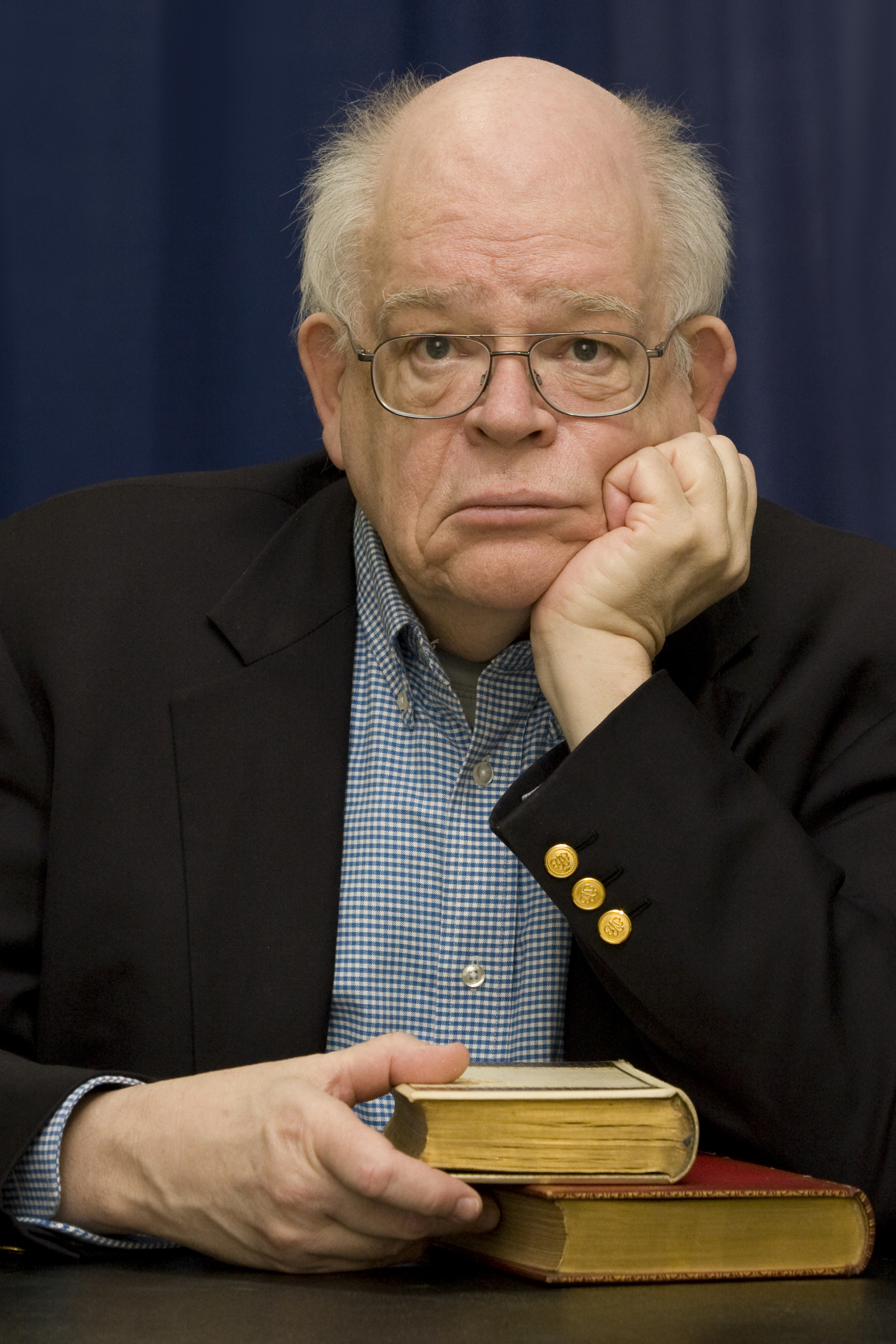
Terry Belanger
Founder of the Rare Book School; MacArthur Genius Grant

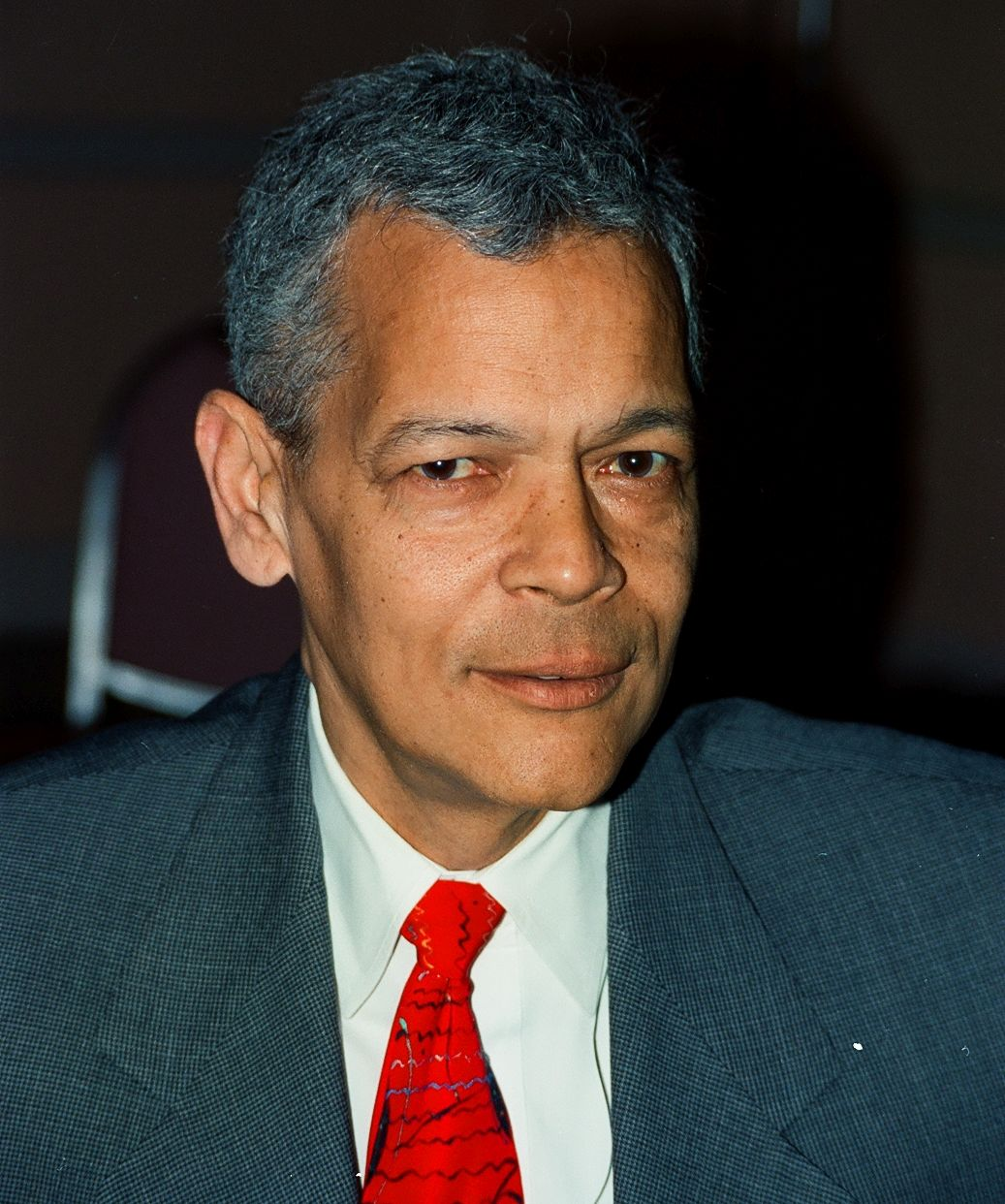
Julian Bond
Co-founder of Southern Poverty Law Center; chairman of the NAACP

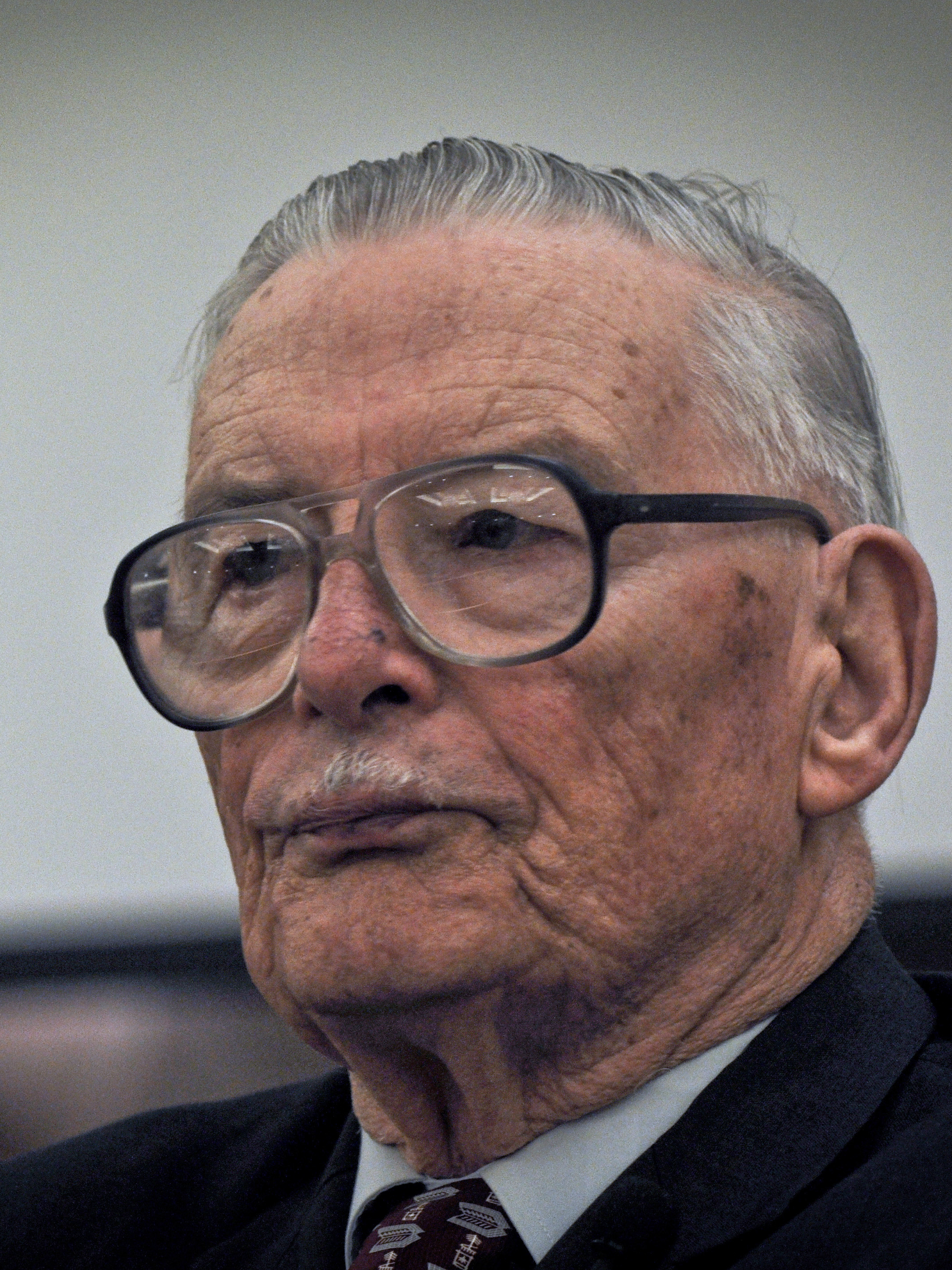
James Buchanan
Founder of Virginia school of political economy; Nobel Prize in Economics

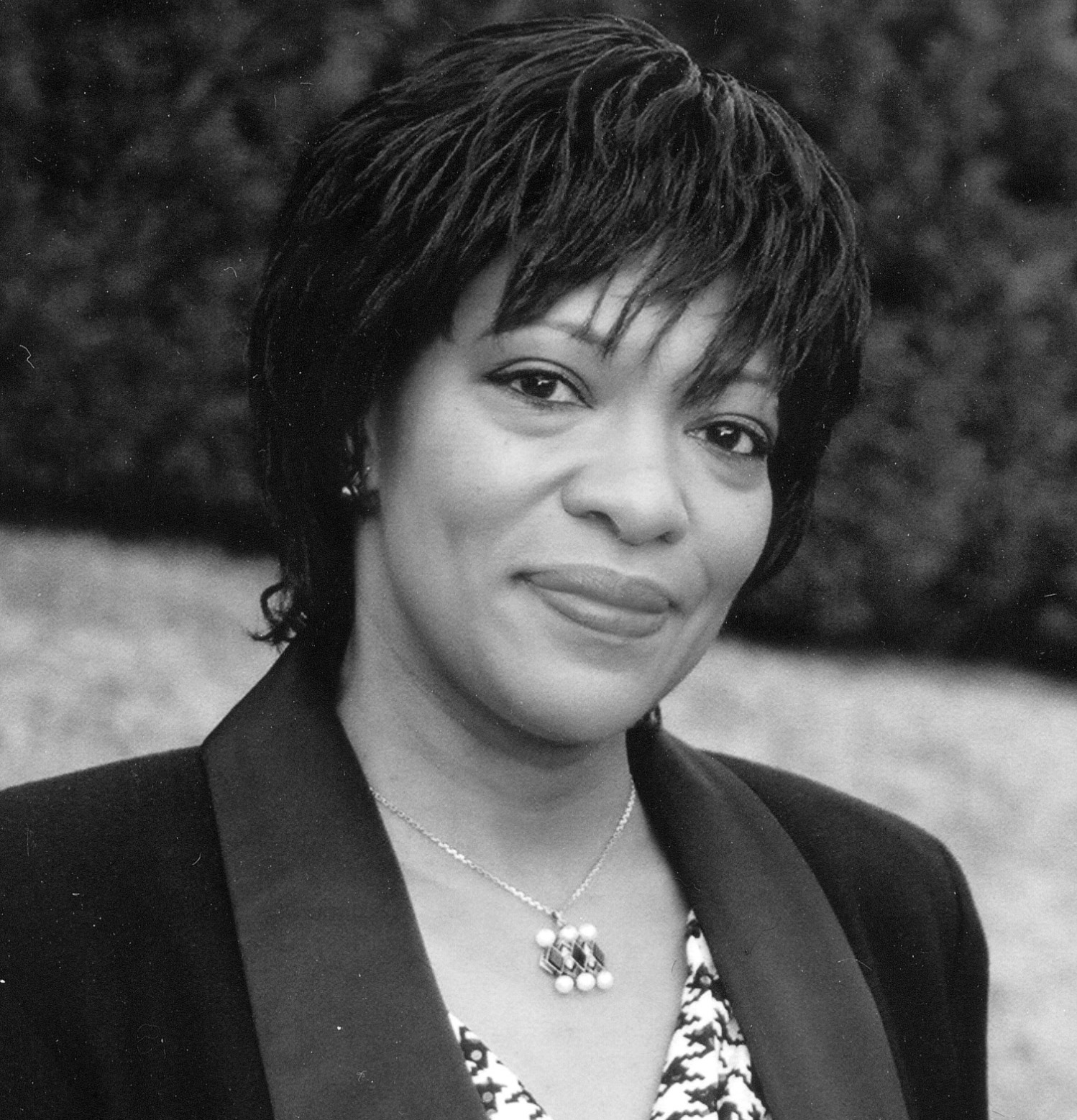
Rita Dove
First African American United States Poet Laureate; Pulitzer Prize for Poetry

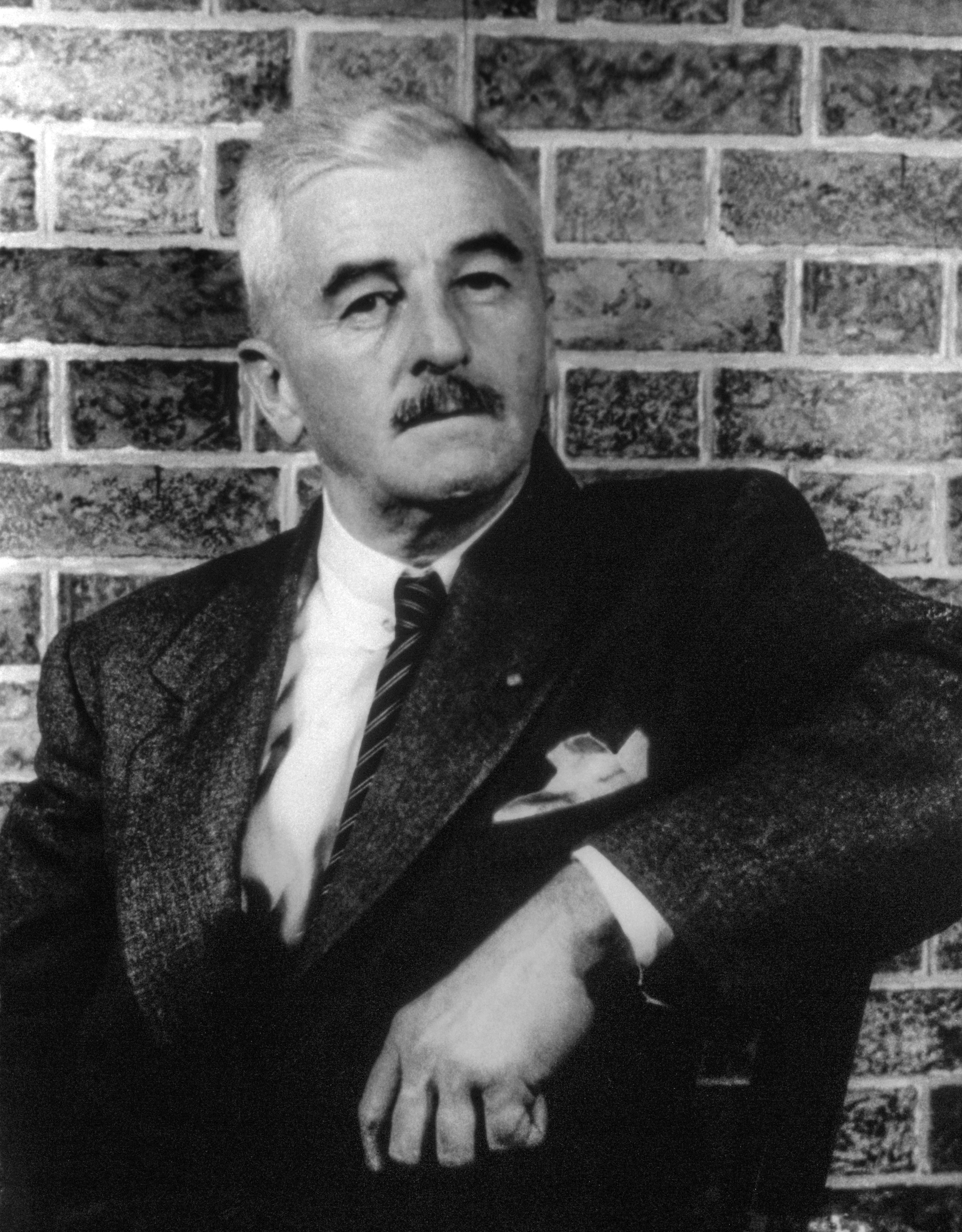
William Faulkner
Nobel Prize in Literature and Pulitzer Prize for Fiction

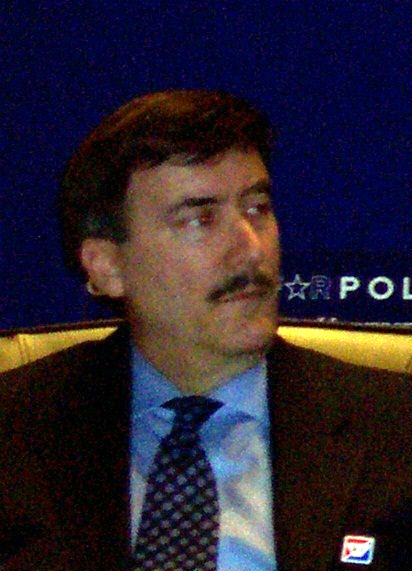
Larry Sabato
Founder of Center for Politics and Larry Sabato's Crystal Ball

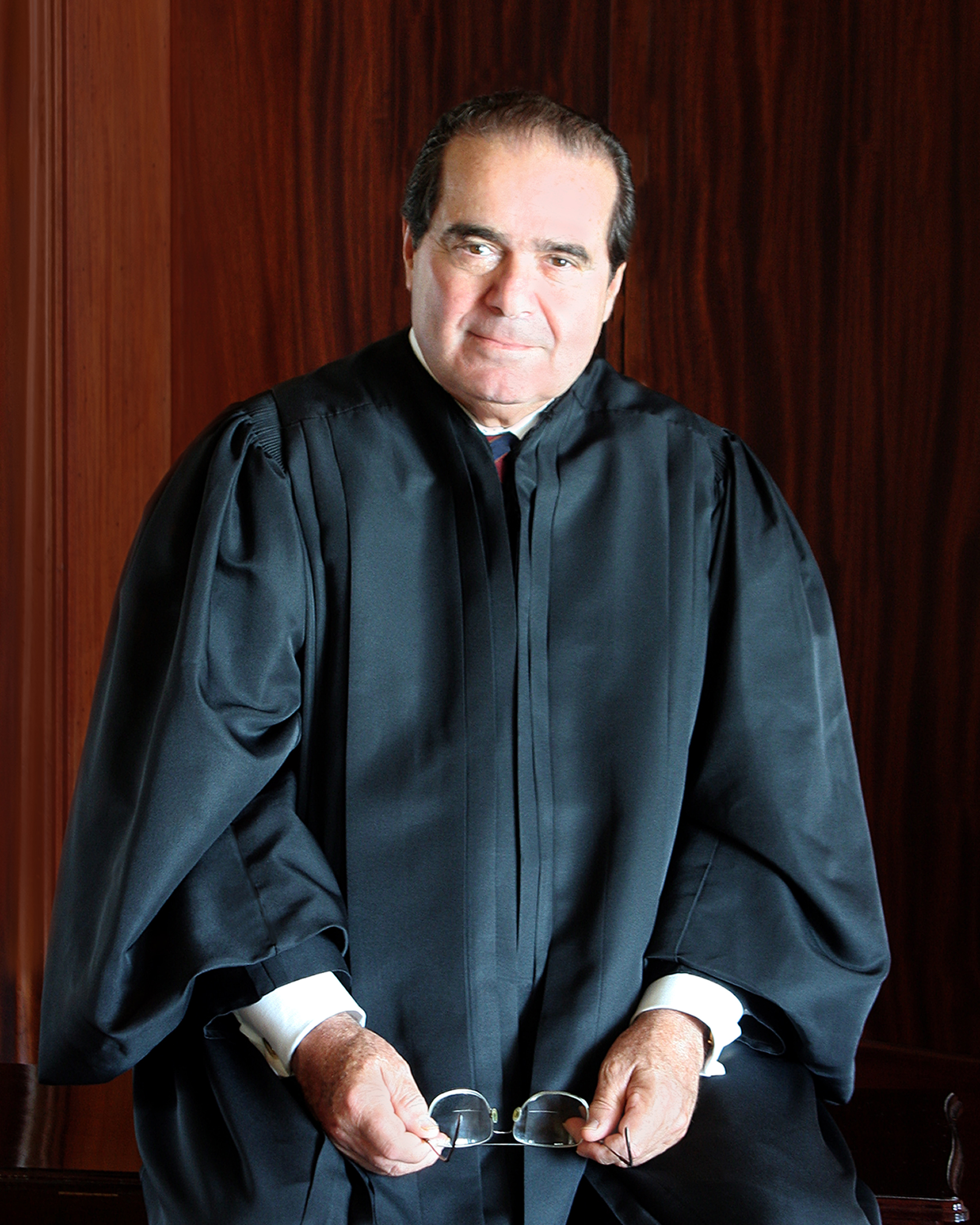
Antonin Scalia
Associate justice of the Supreme Court of the United States

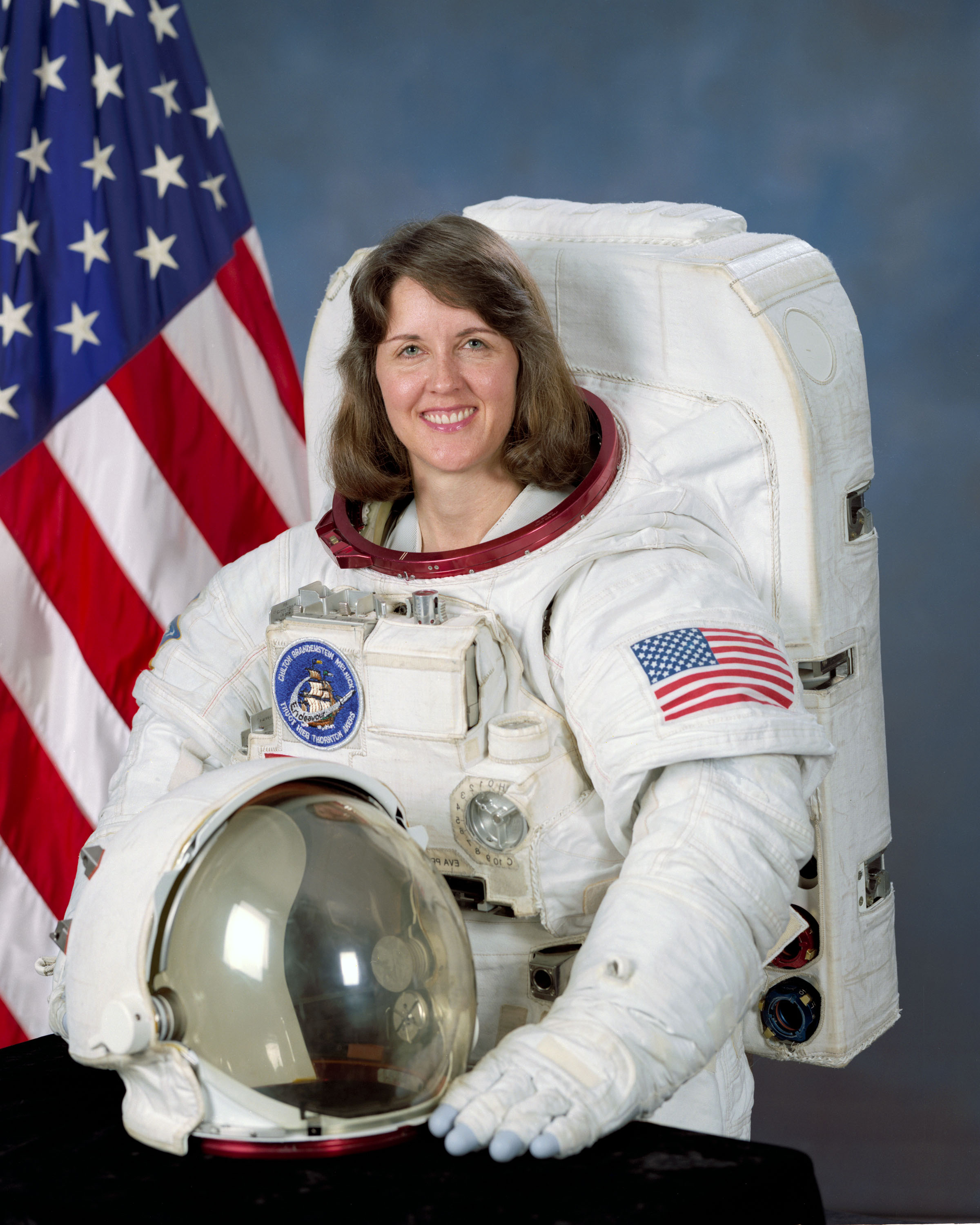
Kathryn Thornton
U.S. Astronaut Hall of Fame; former recordholder for most spacewalks by a woman

=== Alumni ===
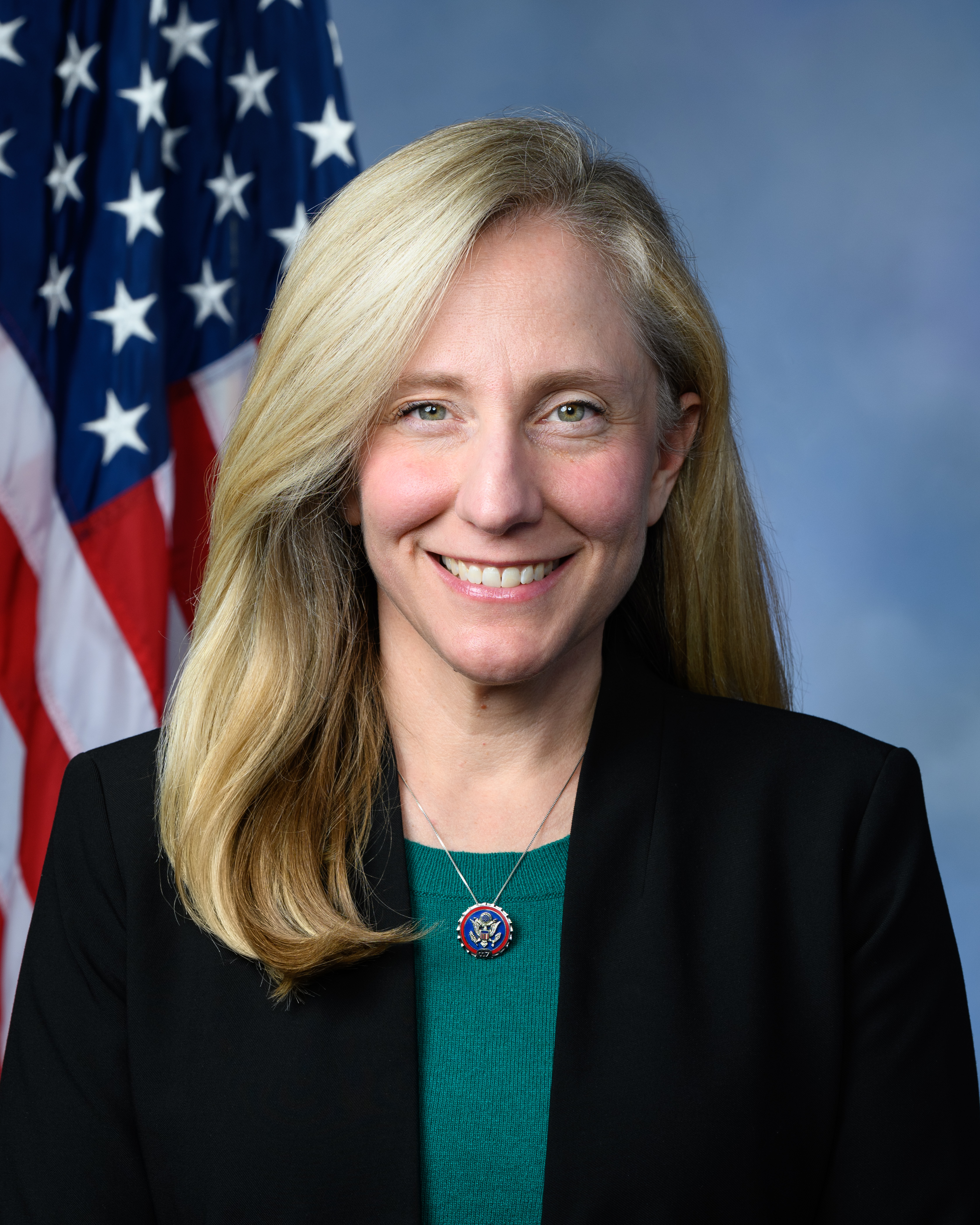
Incumbent Governor of Virginia Abigail Spanberger (2026–present)

As of December 2014, the University of Virginia has 250,000 living graduates. According to a study by researchers at the Darden School and Stanford University, UVA alumni have founded over 65,000 companies which have employed 2.3 million people worldwide with annual global revenues of $1.6 trillion. Extrapolated numbers show companies founded by UVA alumni have created 371,000 jobs in the state of Virginia alone. The relatively small amount that the Commonwealth gives UVA for support was determined by the study to have a tremendous return on investment for the state.

Rhodes Scholarships are international postgraduate awards given to students to study at the University of Oxford. Since the scholarship program began in 1904, UVA has had fifty-seven Rhodes Scholars.

Eight NASA astronauts and launch directors are UVA alumni: Karl Gordon Henize, Bill Nelson, Thomas Marshburn, Leland Melvin, Jeff Wisoff, Kathryn Thornton, Patrick Forrester; and Michael Leinbach.

The Pulitzer Prize has been awarded to eight UVA alumni: Edward P. Jones, Ron Suskind, Virginius Dabney, Claudia Emerson, Henry Taylor, Lane DeGregory, George Rodrigue, and Michael Vitez.

Government leaders include 28th President of the United States Woodrow Wilson (who attended before transferring), former Special Counsel and FBI Director Robert Mueller; NATO Secretary General Javier Solana; U.S. Speaker of the House Robert M. T. Hunter; widely known United States Senators Harry Byrd, Robert F. Kennedy, and Ted Kennedy; first African American Chief Justice of the Virginia Supreme Court Leroy Hassell; Delaware Court of Chancery Vice Chancellor J. Travis Laster; United States Supreme Court Justices Howell Edmunds Jackson, James Clark McReynolds, and Stanley Forman Reed; President of the Supreme Court of Israel, Asher Grunis; and Premier and President of the First Republic of China, Yan Huiqing.

Thirty U.S. state or U.S. territorial governors have graduated from UVA, including sixteen governors of Virginia, (Note: The incumbent governor of Virginia, Abigail Spanberger, is an alumnus. Other alumni who became Governor of Virginia include Gerald Baliles, Jim Gilmore, Chuck Robb, George Allen, John Dalton, Mills Godwin, Albertis Harrison, J. Lindsay Almond, John Battle, Colgate Darden, Elbert Trinkle, Westmoreland Davis, Claude Swanson, Andrew Jackson Montague, and Frederick Holiday.) and fifteen Governors of other U.S. states and territories as well. (Note: Alumni who became Governor of another U.S. state or territory include James Paul Clarke, William Meade Fishback, and Joseph Taylor Robinson (Arkansas), Janet Napolitano (Arizona), Lowell Weicker (Connecticut), Charles Terry (Delaware), Millard Caldwell (Florida), Evan Bayh (Indiana), Andy Beshear and Brereton Jones (Kentucky), Sam McEnery (Louisiana), William Preston Lane (Maryland), Mark Sanford (South Carolina), Henry Mathews (West Virginia), and Luis Fortuño (Puerto Rico).)

UVA's alumni ranks also include others who have achieved widespread fame: computer science pioneer John Backus; polar explorer Richard Byrd; physicians Walter Reed, Charles T. Pepper, J. Hartwell Harrison, Hugh S. Cumming, Rupert Blue, Wade Hampton Frost, Vivian Pinn, and Francis Collins; scientists Stuart Schreiber, Daniel Barringer, and Richard Lutz; artists Edgar Allan Poe and Georgia O'Keeffe; musicians Stephen Malkmus and Boyd Tinsley; self-made billionaire Paul Tudor Jones; national news anchors Katie Couric and Brit Hume; actors Tina Fey, Ben McKenzie, Sarah Drew, Jason George, Dylan Walsh and Sean Patrick Thomas; Team USA Olympic team captains John Harkes, Dawn Staley, and Claudio Reyna; Olympic swimming gold medalists Kate Douglass and Gretchen Walsh; NBA All-Star MVP Ralph Sampson and the NBA's eighth ever 50–40–90 shooter Malcolm Brogdon; two-time FIFA Women's World Cup champions Becky Sauerbrunn, Emily Sonnett and Morgan Gautrat; voice actor Sam Riegel; and social psychologist Jon Maner.

Notable UVA alumni

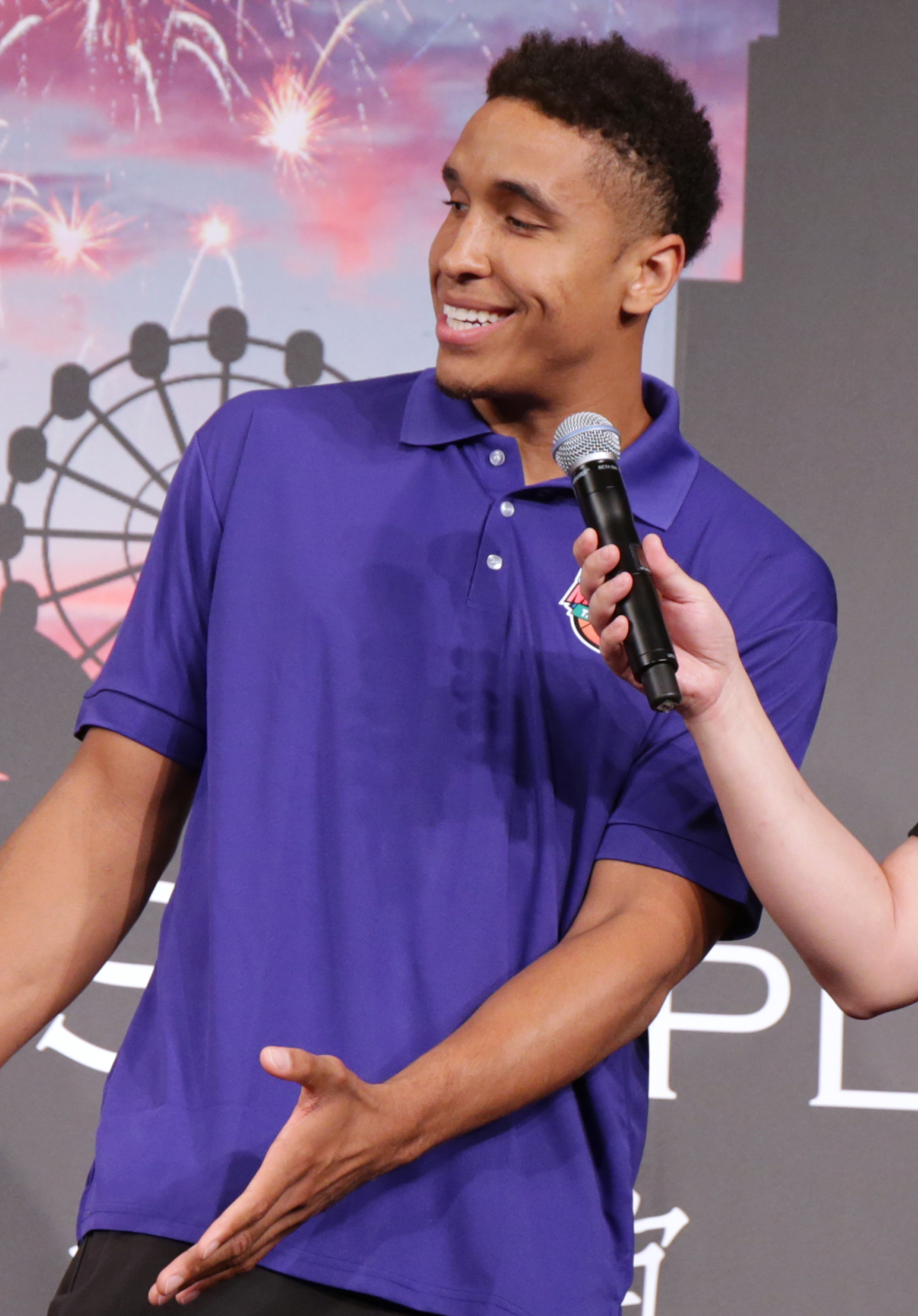
Malcolm Brogdon
(B.A./M.P.P., '15/'16)
8th 50–40–90 club member; 2017 NBA Rookie of the Year

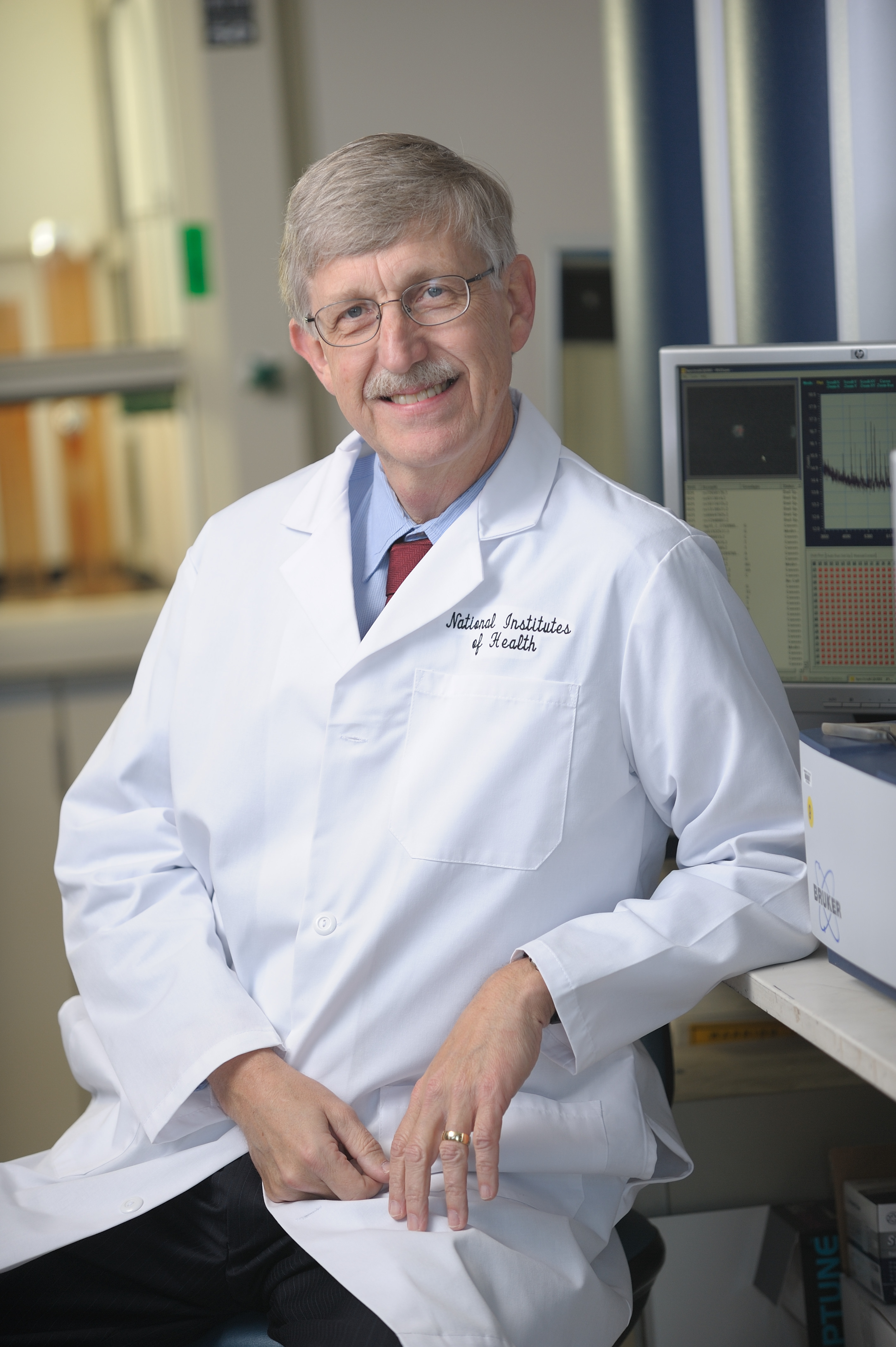
Francis Collins
(B.S., '70)
Director of the National Institutes of Health; project leader of Human Genome Project

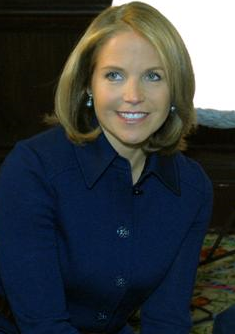
Katie Couric
(B.A., '79)
Television Hall of Fame; news anchor for each of the Big Three television networks

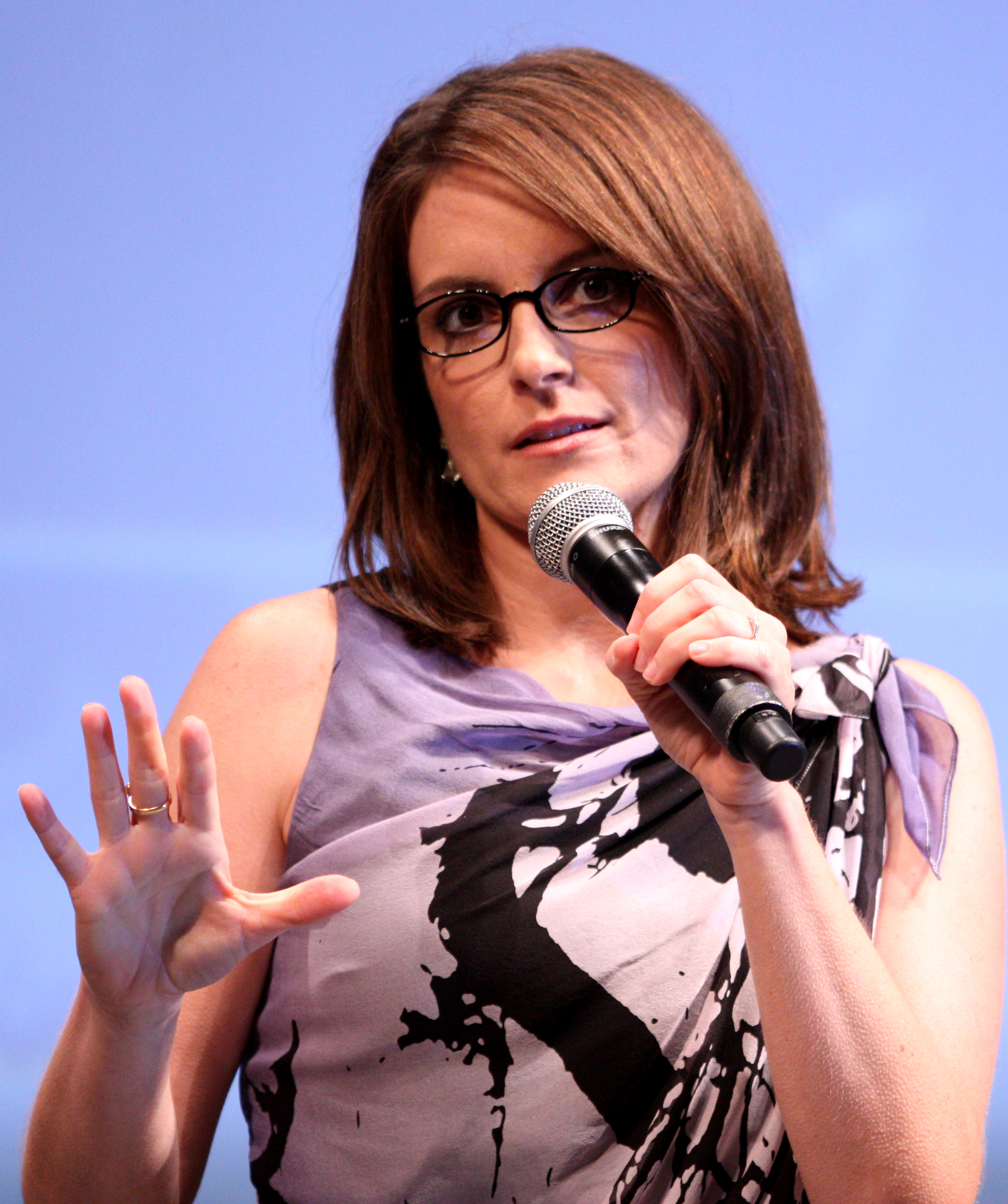
Tina Fey
(B.A., '92)
Saturday Night Live actor and head writer; creator of 30 Rock

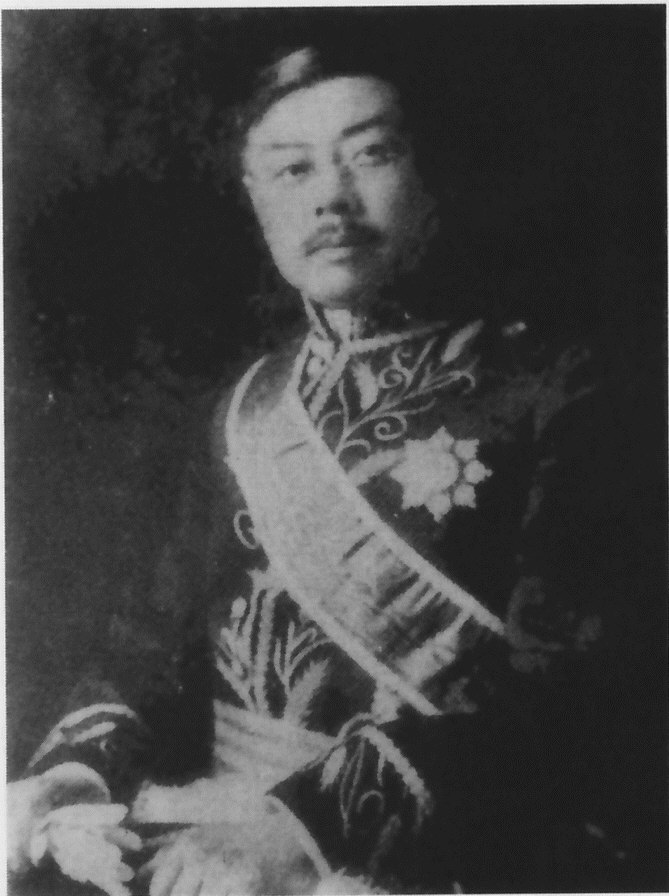
Yan Huiqing
(B.A., 1900)
1st Chinese ambassador to the Soviet Union; premier and acting president of China

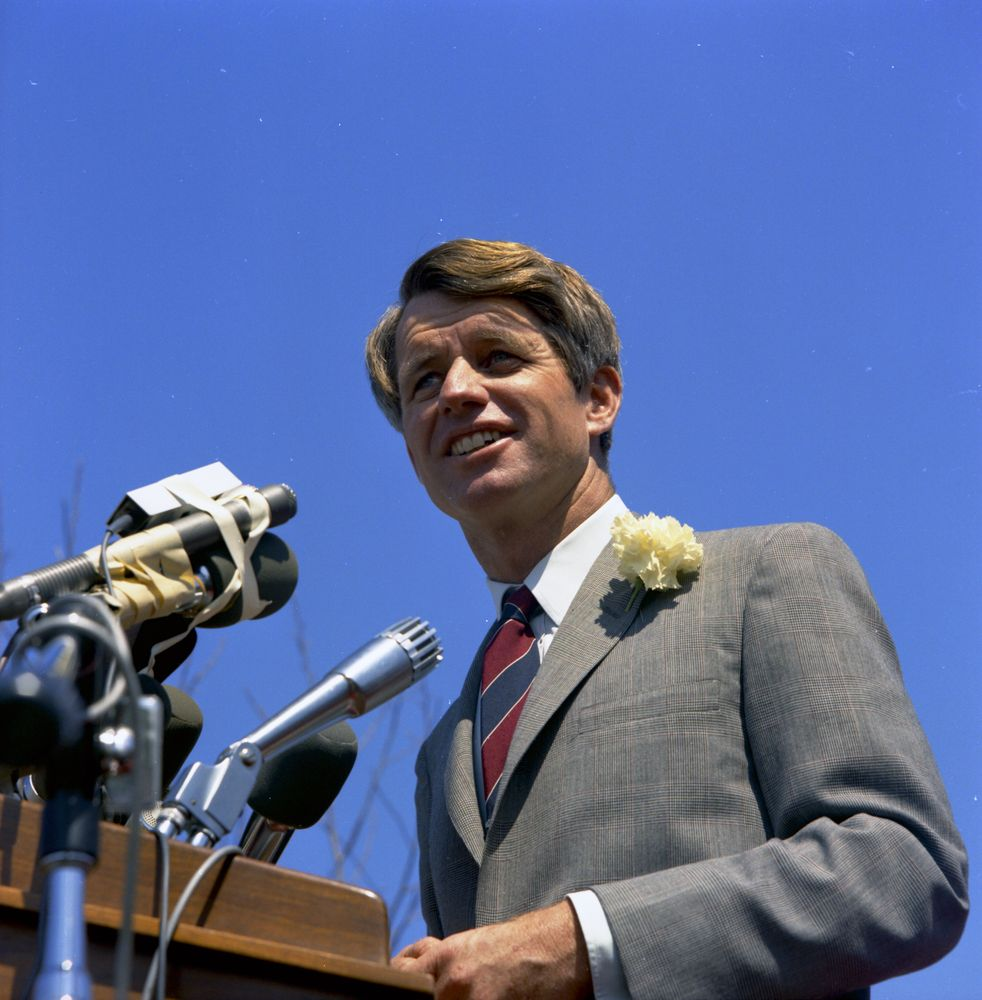
Robert F. Kennedy
(Law, '51)
Assassinated U.S. presidential candidate; U.S. attorney general

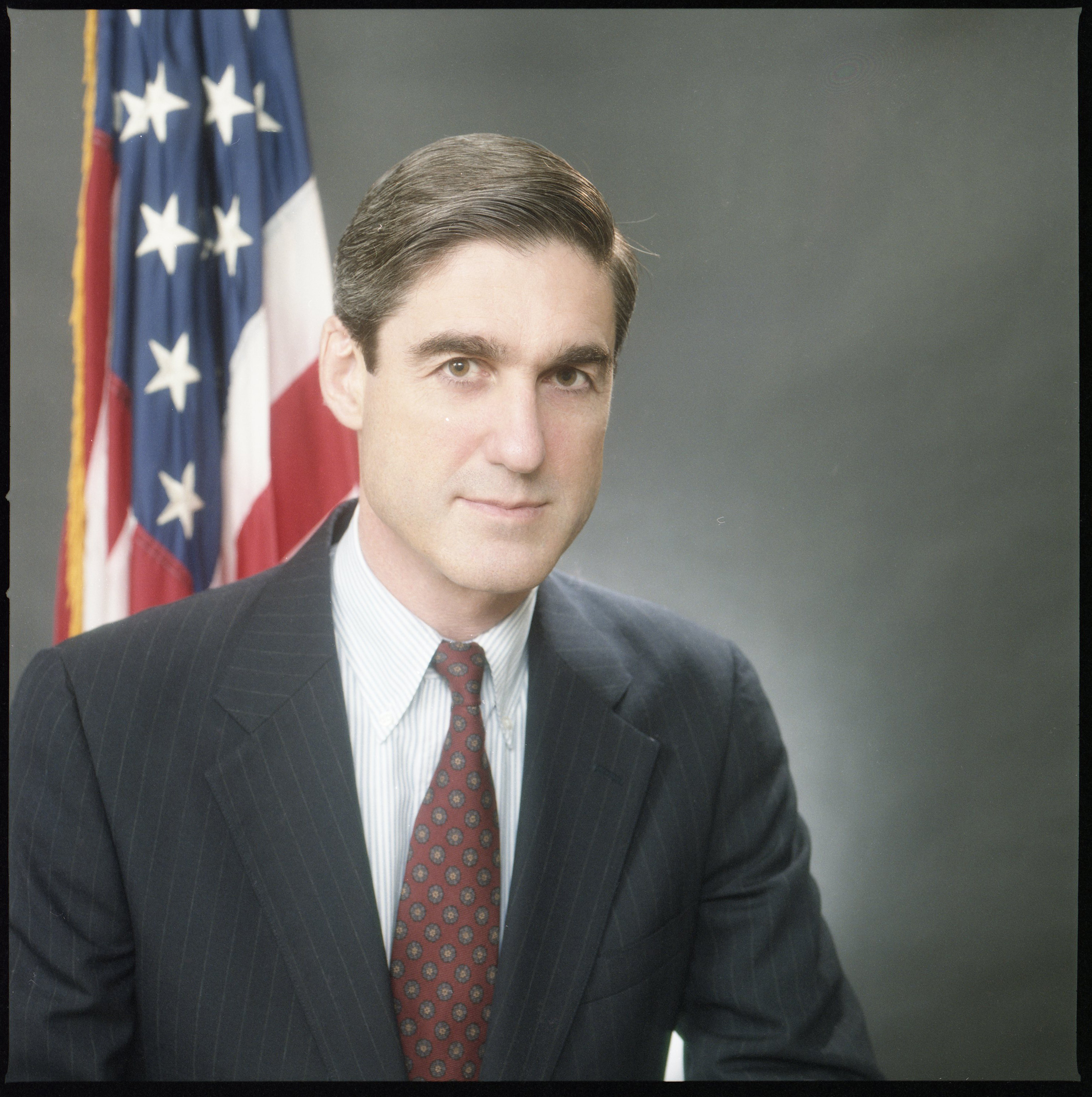
Robert Mueller
(Law, '73)
6th Director of the Federal Bureau of Investigation; author of the Mueller report

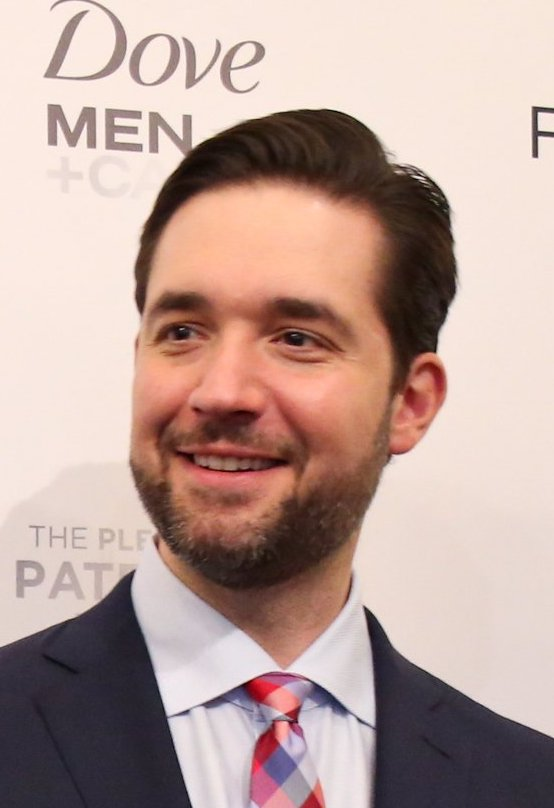
Alexis Ohanian
(B.A./B.S., '05)
Co-founder (with UVA roommate Steve Huffman) of Reddit

== See also ==
- Academic honor code
- Bibliography of Thomas Jefferson
- List of World Heritage Sites in the United States
- Southern Ivy
