= University of Virginia School of Continuing and Professional Studies =

Adult continuing education and distance learning program

The School of Continuing and Professional Studies (SCPS) is the University of Virginia's adult continuing education and distance learning program. It reaches about 15,000 non-traditional students annually at academic centers located in Charlottesville, Hampton Roads, Northern Virginia, Quantico, Richmond, Roanoke, and Southwest Virginia. Other students throughout the U.S. and the world participate through the School’s state-of-the-art distance learning technology. The available programs include undergraduate and graduate degrees, professional development and licensure opportunities, topical conferences and seminars, engaging personal enrichment courses, customized certificate programs, and unique domestic and international travel experiences.
