= National Register of Historic Places listings in Adams County, Pennsylvania =

Location of Adams County in Pennsylvania

This is a list of the National Register of Historic Places listings in Adams County, Pennsylvania.

This is intended to be a complete list of the properties and districts on the National Register of Historic Places in Adams County, Pennsylvania, United States. The locations of National Register properties and districts for which the latitude and longitude coordinates are included below, may be seen in a map.

There are 36 properties and districts listed on the National Register in the county. One site is further designated as a National Historic Site and another is designated as a National Military Park. Another property was once listed but has been removed.

This National Park Service list is complete through NPS recent listings posted March 27, 2026.

== Current listings ==
	Name on the Register	Image	Date listed	Location	Municipality	Description
1	John Abbott House	John Abbott House	February 22, 1980 (#80003394)	East King Street; 39°53′14″N 76°58′55″W	Abbottstown	
2	Adams County Courthouse	Adams County Courthouse	October 1, 1974 (#74001728)	Baltimore and West Middle Streets; 39°49′46″N 77°13′53″W	Gettysburg	
3	Black Horse Tavern	Black Horse Tavern	March 30, 1978 (#78002331)	West of Gettysburg on Pennsylvania Route 116; 39°49′08″N 77°17′02″W	Cumberland Township	
4	Bridge in Cumberland Township	Bridge in Cumberland Township	June 22, 1988 (#88000866)	Legislative Route 01002 over Marsh Creek, near Greenmount; 39°45′27″N 77°17′06″W	Cumberland and Freedom Townships	
5	Carbaugh Run Rhyolite Quarry Site (36AD30)		January 15, 1986 (#86000817)	Atop Snaggy Ridge, west of Carbaugh Run; 39°53′02″N 77°27′26″W	Franklin Township	
6	Cline's Church of the United Brethren in Christ	Cline's Church of the United Brethren in Christ	August 22, 2002 (#02000894)	Cline's Church Road, 0.5 miles (0.80 km) south of Pennsylvania Route 34, near Menallen; 40°00′02″N 77°13′14″W	Menallen Township	
7	Conewago Chapel	Conewago Chapel	January 29, 1975 (#75001604)	3 miles (4.8 km) northwest of Hanover; 39°49′08″N 77°02′17″W	Conewago Township	
8	Dobbin House	Dobbin House	March 26, 1973 (#73001584)	89 Steinwehr Avenue; 39°49′22″N 77°13′58″W	Gettysburg	
9	East Berlin Historic District	East Berlin Historic District	September 30, 1985 (#85002693)	Portions of King, Harrisburg, and Abbottstown Streets; 39°56′17″N 76°58′56″W	East Berlin	
10	Eisenhower National Historic Site	Eisenhower National Historic Site	November 27, 1967 (#67000017)	200 Eisenhower Farm Lane, near Gettysburg; 39°47′45″N 77°16′02″W	Cumberland Township	
11	Fairfield Historic District	Fairfield Historic District	May 18, 2000 (#00000518)	Roughly bounded by Landis Drive, Steelman Street, Wortz Drive, and the northwestern borough boundary 39°47′36″N 77°22′10″W	Fairfield	
12	Fairfield Inn	Fairfield Inn	April 2, 1973 (#73001583)	Main Street; 39°47′13″N 77°22′11″W	Fairfield	
13	Gettysburg Armory	Gettysburg Armory	April 18, 1990 (#90000422)	315 West Confederate Avenue; 39°49′37″N 77°14′38″W	Gettysburg	
14	Gettysburg Battlefield Historic District	Gettysburg Battlefield Historic District	March 19, 1975 (#75000155)	Town of Gettysburg and its environs 39°48′59″N 77°13′49″W	Cumberland Township, Gettysburg, and Highland Township	
15	Gettysburg National Military Park	Gettysburg National Military Park	October 15, 1966 (#66000642)	Gettysburg National Military Park, near Gettysburg; 39°48′43″N 77°14′39″W	Cumberland, Highland, and Straban Townships	
16	Great Conewago Presbyterian Church	Great Conewago Presbyterian Church	December 27, 1974 (#74001730)	Church Road, near Hunterstown; 39°53′15″N 77°09′46″W	Straban Township	
17	Heikes Covered Bridge	Heikes Covered Bridge	August 25, 1980 (#80003396)	North of Heidlersburg on Township 5857; 39°58′41″N 77°08′47″W	Huntington and Tyrone Townships	
18	Horner House and Barn	Horner House and Barn	May 24, 2007 (#07000468)	20 Horner Road; 39°43′41″N 77°14′59″W	Cumberland Township	
19	Hunterstown Historic District	Hunterstown Historic District	May 15, 1979 (#79002154)	Pennsylvania Route 394 and Granite Station Road, in Hunterstown; 39°53′03″N 77°09′36″W	Straban Township	
20	Jacks Mountain Covered Bridge	Jacks Mountain Covered Bridge	August 25, 1980 (#80003397)	Southwest of Fairfield on Legislative Route 01053, near Iron Springs; 39°46′01″N 77°23′13″W	Carroll Valley and Hamiltonban Township	
21	John's Burnt Mill Bridge	John's Burnt Mill Bridge	December 16, 1974 (#74001731)	Southwest of New Oxford on Township 428; 39°49′56″N 77°04′47″W	Mount Pleasant and Oxford Townships	
22	Lincoln Cemetery		September 15, 2025 (#100012230)	408 Long Lane; 39°49′33″N 77°14′09″W	Gettysburg	
23	Lower Marsh Creek Presbyterian Church	Lower Marsh Creek Presbyterian Church	October 15, 1980 (#80003399)	Southeast of Orrtanna on Legislative Route 01002; 39°48′42″N 77°19′59″W	Highland Township	
24	Lutheran Theological Seminary-Old Dorm	Lutheran Theological Seminary-Old Dorm	May 3, 1974 (#74001729)	Seminary Ridge, Lutheran Theological Seminary campus 39°49′55″N 77°14′41″W	Gettysburg	
25	Mason and Dixon West Line Milestone Markers 76 and 77		August 21, 2018 (#100002789)	716 Mason Dixon Rd. 39°43′12″N 77°13′15″W	Cumberland Township	Extends into Frederick County, Maryland
26	Jacob and Juliana Middlekauff House	Jacob and Juliana Middlekauff House	January 17, 2017 (#100000500)	530 Flohrs Church Rd. 39°52′23″N 77°20′29″W	Franklin Township	
27	Pennsylvania Hall, Gettysburg College	Pennsylvania Hall, Gettysburg College	March 16, 1972 (#72001087)	Gettysburg College campus 39°50′06″N 77°14′05″W	Gettysburg	
28	Pleasant Grove School	Pleasant Grove School	September 4, 2012 (#12000603)	4084 Baltimore Pike, Germantown; 39°45′51″N 77°08′16″W	Mount Joy Township	part of the Educational Resources of Pennsylvania Multiple Property Submission (MPS)
29	Pond Mill Bridge	Pond Mill Bridge	June 22, 1988 (#88000816)	Legislative Route 01009 over Bermudian Creek, near Bermudian; 39°59′45″N 77°03′31″W	Latimore Township	
30	Rock Creek-White Run Union Hospital Complex	Rock Creek-White Run Union Hospital Complex	May 18, 2000 (#00000520)	Baltimore Pike, Goulden Road, and White Church Road, near Mount Joy; 39°47′20″N 77°11′59″W	Cumberland Township, Gettysburg, and Mount Joy Township	
31	Sauck's Covered Bridge	Sauck's Covered Bridge	August 25, 1980 (#80003395)	Waterworks Road over Marsh Creek; 39°47′51″N 77°16′35″W	Cumberland and Freedom Townships	
32	Sheads House	Sheads House	December 8, 1976 (#76001592)	331 Buford Avenue; 39°50′03″N 77°14′35″W	Gettysburg	
33	Spangler-Benner Farm	Spangler-Benner Farm	October 29, 1992 (#92001493)	230 Benner Road, near Gettysburg; 39°44′39″N 77°13′34″W	Mount Joy Township	
34	Thomas Brothers Store	Thomas Brothers Store	August 15, 2008 (#08000780)	4 South Main Street; 39°55′49″N 77°14′53″W	Biglerville	
35	Wirts House	Wirts House	January 22, 1992 (#91002010)	798 Schrivers Corner Road (Pennsylvania Route 394), near Gettysburg; 39°53′45″N 77°11′58″W	Straban Township	
36	John Zeigler Farm House		May 7, 1992 (#92000395)	1281 Mountain Road, near York Springs; 40°02′56″N 77°07′02″W	Latimore Township	

== Former listings ==
	Name on the Register	Image	Date listed	Date removed	Location	Municipality	Description
1	Conewago Mass House		October 19, 1978 (#78002332)	January 11, 1996	North of McSherrystown on Pennsylvania Route 476, Conewago Township	McSherrystown	Destroyed by fire in August 1995.
2	Conewago Chapel Covered Bridge		August 26, 1980 (#80003398)	June 27, 1986	Legislative Route 01060	McSherrystown	Destroyed by arsonist on June 14, 1985.

== See also ==
- List of Pennsylvania state historical markers in Adams County
