= List of Gettysburg Battlefield observation towers =

Gettysburg Battlefield observation decks may refer to the towers which are historic district contributing structures or other buildings used as observation platforms in the postbellum battlefield eras and during the 1863 Battle of Gettysburg:

- Adams County Courthouse (Pennsylvania), with cupola used by the Army of Northern Virginia during the battle
- Confederate Avenue Observation Tower, a 75 ft (23 m) version of the same Cope design on Warfield Ridge
- Culp's Hill Observation Tower, a 60 ft (18 m) Cope tower southeast of the borough of Gettysburg
- Cyclorama Building observation deck, a closed Zeigler's Grove visitor site for viewing Cemetery Ridge and the field of Pickett's Charge
- Eternal Light Peace Memorial, a memorial structure with an elevated platform for viewing the battlefield
- Evergreen Cemetery gatehouse, with roof used as an observation platform during the battle
- Fahnestock House, with roof used as an observation platform for viewing the battle and one of 315 contributing structures of the Historic District
- Forty-fourth New York Monument, a castellated building with an observation deck and a closed 44 ft (13 m) tower on Little Round Top
- Oak Ridge Observation Tower, a 23 ft (7.0 m) truncated Cope design northwest of Gettysburg
- Pennsylvania Hall (Gettysburg, Pennsylvania), with cupola used for viewing the battle from Pennsylvania College (now Gettysburg College)
- Schmucker Hall, with cupola used for viewing the battle from the Lutheran seminary on Seminary Ridge
- Springs Hotel and Horse Railroad, an 1869-1917 hotel with cupola used for viewing the battlefield
- The Pennsylvania State Memorial, a pavilion monument on Cemetery Ridge with a 2nd-story observation deck and 1st floor viewing plaza
- Western Maryland Passenger Depot, one of the buildings of the borough's station from which battle casualties viewed during the battle

== See also ==
- Gettysburg National Tower, a 1974-2000 commercial hyperboloid tower of 308 ft (94 m) south of the borough
