= Bridge in Cumberland Township =

Cunningham Bridge
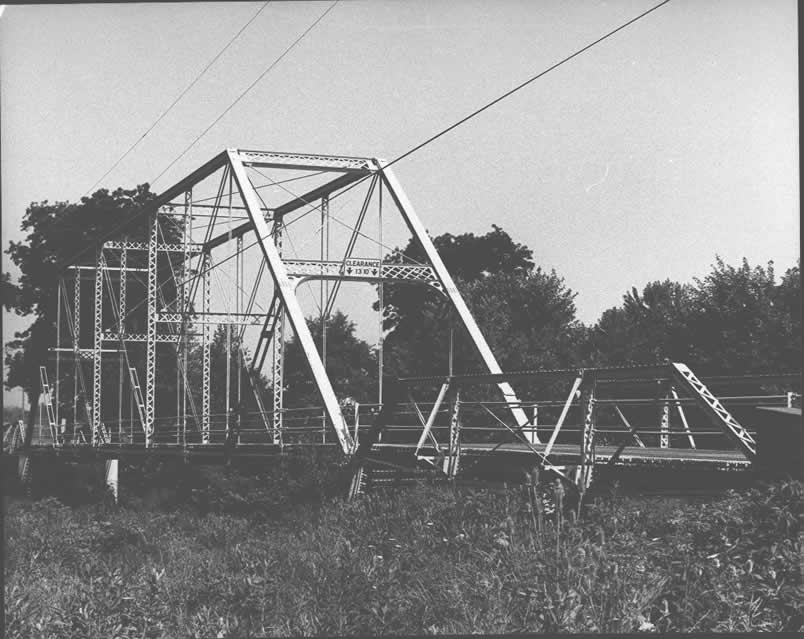
- Cunningham Bridge in 1982
- Coordinates: 39°45′27″N 77°17′6″W
- Carried: Cunningham Road
- Crossed: Marsh Creek
- Locale: Greenmount, Adams County, PA
- Maintained by: PennDOT

Characteristics
- Design: mainspan is the "first example" of a Baltimore truss
- Total length: 256 feet (78 m)
- Width: 13 feet, 8 inches
- Load limit: 3 tons
- Clearance above: 11 feet, 7 inches

History
- Closed: June 2005
- Demolished: 2013

Location
- Interactive map of Cunningham Bridge

- Bridge in Cumberland Township
- U.S. National Register of Historic Places
- Location within Pennsylvania
- Area: 0.9 acres (0.36 ha)
- Built: 1894
- Architect: Nelson & Buchanon
- NRHP reference No.: 88000866
- Added to NRHP: June 22, 1988

The Cunningham Bridge was a historic bridge previously listed on the National Register in Adams County, Pennsylvania, near Greenmount, Pennsylvania, United States. The three-section iron bridge spanned west-to-east from Franklin Township to Cumberland Township and was, at the time of its demolition, among the oldest examples of a Baltimore truss.

It was listed on the National Register of Historic Places as "Bridge in Cumberland Township" in 1988 despite being in Franklin Township, Adams County, Pennsylvania.

The bridge was permanently closed to traffic in June 2005 due to structural degradation and safety concerns. Despite efforts by the Adams County Commissioners to preserve it, the bridge was eventually demolished in 2013 and subsequently replaced.

== Chronology ==
- 1894 — The Pittsburgh Bridge Company (Nelson & Buchanon Engrs. & Contrs, agents) built the bridge 0.5 mile west of the Greenmount.
- 1986 — A $138,512 upgrade began for the bridge.
- 1990 — The bridge was closed indefinitely.
- 1996 — After having been struck by a motorist in the Spring, the Cunningham Bridge survived a 500 year flood on June 19 that washed away the wooden Sachs Covered Bridge (upstream) and the iron 1886 Rothhaupt Bridge (downstream).
- 1997 — A 1997 Pennsylvania Department of Transportation (PennDOT) study recommended replacing the entire bridge, and the Adams County Citizens Alliance held a meeting on April 8 regarding the bridge.
- 2000 — PennDOT planned to demolish the Cunningham Bridge.
- 2002 — A resolution by the county commissioners was for "every effort should be made to keep the bridge at its current location [and] preserve as much historic detail as possible."
- 2011 — The bridge was slated for demolition in 2011.
- 2013 — The bridge was demolished and replaced in 2013.

== See also ==
- National Register of Historic Places listings in Adams County, Pennsylvania
