= List of Pennsylvania state historical markers in Adams County =

Location of Adams County in Pennsylvania

Pennsylvania state historical markers in Adams County by the Pennsylvania Historical and Museum Commission (PHMC) are 44 signs, including 16 regarding the Gettysburg campaign.

== Historical markers ==
Marker title	Image	Date dedicated	Location	Marker type	Topics
Adams County		November 6, 1982	Old Courthouse, Baltimore & W. Middle Sts. (Bus. 15 & PA 116), Gettysburg; 39.82963°N 77.23132°W	City	Abraham Lincoln, Agriculture, Civil War, Government & Politics, Government & Politics 19th Century
Christ Reformed Church		February 21, 1950	Hanover & Christ Church Rds. (PA 194 & SR 2023), 1.1 miles NE of Littlestown; 39.75374°N 77.05745°W	Roadside	Buildings, Early Settlement, Ethnic & Immigration, Religion
Conewago Chapel		December 12, 1947	U.S. 30 W of New Oxford; 39.86151°N 77.06869°W	Roadside	Buildings, Religion
Daniel Alexander Payne		March 10, 1991	239 N. Washington St. at Gettysburg College; 39.83448°N 77.23333°W	City	African American, Education, Religion
Dobbin House		December 12, 1947	Business U.S. 15 (Steinwehr Ave.) near Pa. 134, Gettysburg; 39.822°N 77.23228°W	Roadside	Buildings, Education
Dwight D. Eisenhower		December 12, 1994	157 N. Washington St., Gettysburg; 39.83326°N 77.23356°W	City	Government & Politics, Government & Politics 20th Century, Houses & Homesteads, Military, Military Post-Civil War
Eddie Plank		August 31, 2000	intersection of Carlisle St. & West Lincoln Ave., Gettysburg; 39.83635°N 77.23134°W	Roadside	Baseball, Sports
Field Hospital		September 1, 1951	Pa. 116 (Main St.) at St. John Lutheran Church, Fairfield; 39.78739°N 77.36883°W	City	Civil War, Medicine & Science, Military
Gettys Crossroads and Tavern		September 1, 1954	44 York St., Gettysburg; 39.83091°N 77.22953°W	City	American Revolution, Business, Roads, Inns & Taverns, Transportation
Gettysburg Address		December 12, 1947	PA 134 (Taneytown Rd.) at entrance to National Cemetery; 39.8177°N 77.23245°W	Roadside	Abraham Lincoln, Civil War, Government & Politics, Government & Politics 19th Century, Military
Gettysburg Address		December 12, 1947	Baltimore St. (old US 140) & PA 134 at entrance to National Cemetery; 39.82149°N 77.22957°W	Roadside	Abraham Lincoln, Civil War, Government & Politics, Government & Politics 19th Century
Gettysburg campaign		November 13, 1998	Rt. 30 & Calvary Field Rd., east of Gettysburg; 39.84834°N 77.18249°W	Roadside	Civil War, Military
Gettysburg Campaign		December 12, 1947	Fairfield Rd. (PA 116), near Bream's Mill Rd., W of Gettysburg	Roadside	Civil War, Military
Gettysburg Campaign		December 12, 1947	PA 394 just west of PA 94, Hampton; 39.92926°N 77.05856°W	Roadside	Civil War, Military
Gettysburg Campaign		December 12, 1947	Old Rte. 30 just west of SR 3011, north of Cashtown; 39.88469°N 77.36048°W	Roadside	Civil War, Military
Gettysburg Campaign		December 12, 1947	Pa. 134, .7 mile north of state line 39.72954°N 77.21054°W	Roadside	Civil War, Military
Gettysburg Campaign		December 12, 1947	SR 3001 (old US 15) just south of Rt. 234, Heidlersburg; 39.94713°N 77.14734°W	Roadside	Civil War, Military
Gettysburg Campaign		December 12, 1947	Baltimore Pike (US 97), 2 miles SE of Gettysburg; 39.80444°N 77.20972°W	Roadside	Civil War, Military
Gettysburg Campaign		December 12, 1947	PA 134 at SR 1002 (Taneytown & Barlow-Greenmount Rds.) at Barlow Fire Co. (new location in 2008); 39.7622°N 77.23235°W	Roadside	Civil War, Military
Gettysburg Campaign		December 18, 1947	Old US 15 near Marsh Creek, S of Greenmount; 39.74833°N 77.28302°W	Roadside	Civil War, Military
Gettysburg Campaign		December 12, 1947	SR 3001 (old Rt. 15), just north of Heidlersburg; 39.95424°N 77.14378°W	Roadside	Civil War, Military
Gettysburg Campaign		December 12, 1947	Herrs Ridge & Biglerville (PA 34) Rds., 3 miles N of Gettysburg; 39.84846°N 77.24387°W	Roadside	Civil War, Military
Gettysburg Campaign		n/a	US 30 just east of PA 94 junction, east of New Oxford; 39.86958°N 77.03123°W	Roadside	Civil War, Military
Gettysburg Campaign		December 12, 1947	US 30 at W approach to Gettysburg; 39.83769°N 77.2515°W	Roadside	Civil War, Military
Gettysburg Campaign		n/a	U.S. 30 just W of PA 94 junction, E of New Oxford; 39.87296°N 77.02246°W	Roadside	Civil War, Military
John Hanson "Hance" Steelman (1655-1749) - PLAQUE		July 24, 1977	SW corner intersection of Steelman Marker Rd., Crum Rd. (T-111), & Topper Rd. (T-312), just E of Zora; 39.73498°N 77.36029°W	Plaque	Early Settlement, Ethnic & Immigration, Native American
John Hanson Steelman		December 12, 1977	Near Pa. 16 & Pa. 116 junction, betw. Zora & state line (Missing)	Roadside	Early Settlement, Ethnic & Immigration, Native American, Professions & Vocations, William Penn
John Studebaker		December 6, 1948	Oxford Rd. (SR 1015), just off PA 234, 1/2 mile E of Heidlersburg; 39.56906°N 77.07901°W	Roadside	Business & Industry, Entrepreneurs, Transportation
Lincoln Cemetery		November 15, 2003	Intersection of Lincoln & Long Lanes, Gettysburg; 39.82616°N 77.23575°W	Roadside	African American, Civil War, Military, Military Post-Civil War
Lower Marsh Creek Church		July 15, 1948	PA 116 & SR 3013 (Knoxlyn Rd.), 4 miles W of Gettysburg; 39.81061°N 77.3211°W	Roadside	Buildings, Religion
Manor of Maske		August 11, 1954	U.S. 30 at E end of Gettysburg; 39.83576°N 77.21736°W	Roadside	Buildings, Mansions & Manors, William Penn
Manor of Maske		August 11, 1954	U.S. 30 near SR 1077, W of Seven Stars; 39.86488°N 77.31337°W	Roadside	Buildings, Mansions & Manors, William Penn
Mary Jemison		December 12, 1947	U.S. 30 at PA 234 junction, 4 miles W of Cashtown; 39.89749°N 77.43612°W	Roadside	French & Indian War, Native American, Women
Old Courthouse		September 1, 1954	SW section of Square, York (Rt. 30) & Baltimore Sts., Gettysburg; 39.83093°N 77.23087°W	City	Government & Politics, Government & Politics 19th Century
Pennsylvania		December 6, 1948	U.S. 15, 200 yards from state line 39.71984°N 77.3065°W	Roadside	Government & Politics, Government & Politics 17th Century, William Penn
Pennsylvania		December 6, 1946	US 97 at Mathias Rd., .4 mile from state line (MISSING)	Roadside	Government & Politics, Government & Politics 17th Century, William Penn
Rock Chapel		December 12, 1947	SR 3001 / Old US 15 (Old Harrisburg Rd.) & SR 1016 (Oxford Rd.), N of Heidlersburg; 39.96082°N 77.14032°W	Roadside	Buildings, Religion
Rural Electrification		August 21, 1990	Pa. 34 near Palace Dr., 1.7 miles N of Gettysburg; 39.86307°N 77.23836°W	Roadside	Business & Industry, Electricity
Russell Tavern		December 12, 1947	Pa. 34 at Goldenville Rd., 4 miles N of Gettysburg (MISSING); 39.89217°N 77.24621°W	Roadside	Buildings, Business & Industry, George Washington, Military, Inns & Taverns, Whiskey Rebellion
Sachs Covered Bridge		July 20, 1997	Pumping Station Rd. (SR 3005) & Waterworks Rd., SW of Eisenhower Nat'l. Hist site, Gettysburg; 39.79856°N 77.27915°W	Roadside	Bridges, Civil War, Transportation
Studebaker Home		August 15, 1970	200 W. King St. (PA 234) W of Abbottstown St. (PA 194), East Berlin; 39.93912°N 76.98063°W	City	Buildings, Houses & Homesteads, Professions & Vocations, Religion
Tapeworm Railroad		May 2, 1967	Fairfield Rd. (PA 116) & Iron Springs Rd. (SR 3014), SW of Fairfield; 39.78133°N 77.37821°W	Roadside	Railroads, Transportation
Thaddeus Stevens		September 1, 1954	51 Chambersburg St., Gettysburg; 39.83097°N 77.23276°W	City	African American, Business & Industry, Education, Government & Politics, Iron
Wills House		November 19, 1949	SE section of Square, York St. (Rt. 30) & Baltimore/Carlisle St. (Rt. 116), Gettysburg; 39.83077°N 77.23085°W	City	Government & Politics, Government & Politics 19th Century, Houses & Homesteads

== See also ==
- List of Pennsylvania state historical markers
- National Register of Historic Places listings in Adams County, Pennsylvania
