= Gettysburg Battlefield Historic District =

Historic district in Pennsylvania, United States

- U.S. National Register of Historic Places
- U.S. Historic district
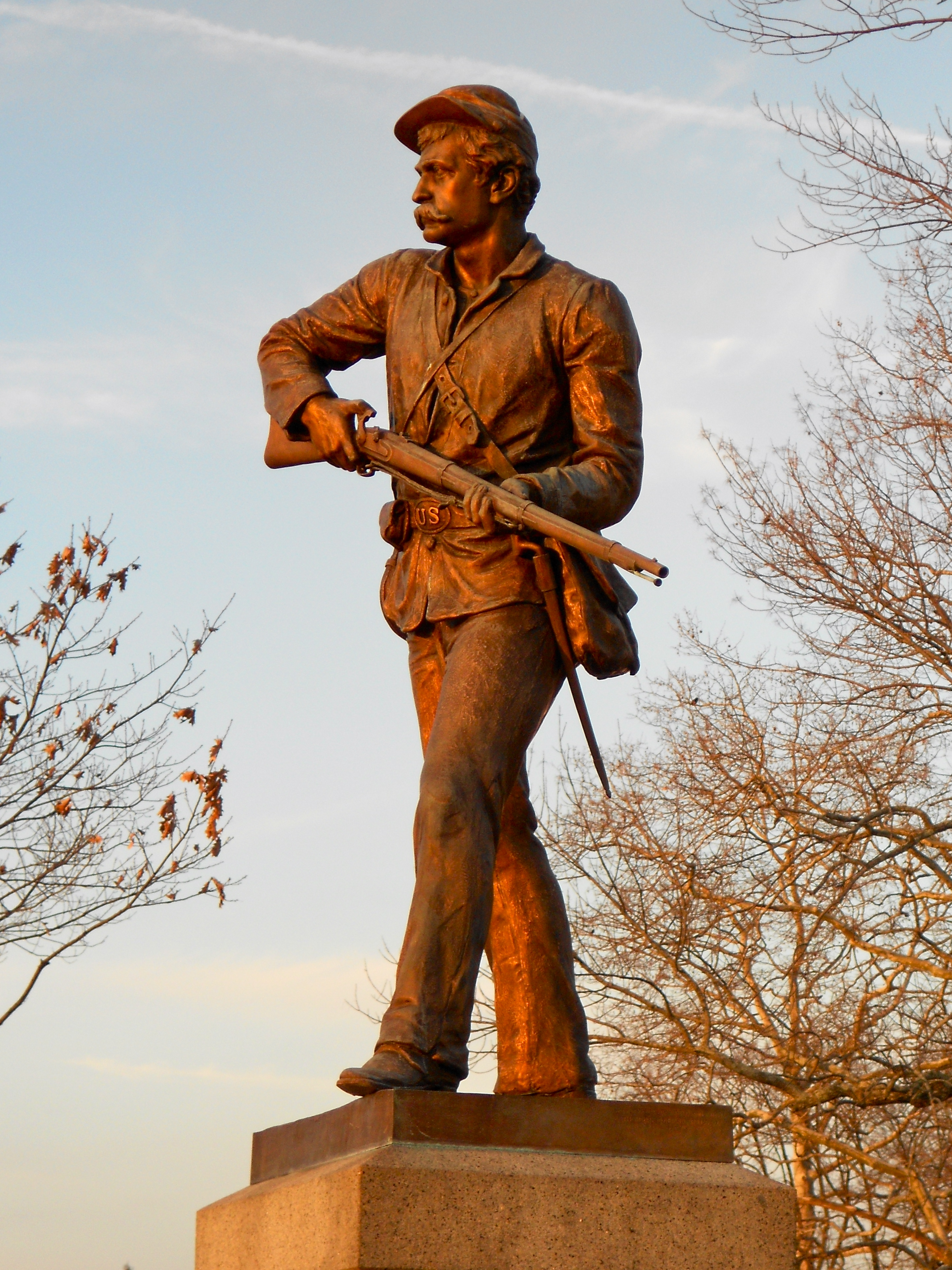
- Memorial on the Gettysburg Battlefield to the 111th New York Infantry, February 2012

- Location within Pennsylvania Location within the United States
- Location: Adams County, Pennsylvania
- Coordinates: 39°48′59″N 77°13′49″W
- Area: ~11,000 acres (4,500 ha)
- Architectural style: Colonial (1776 tavern), Neoclassical (1797 hotel), Vernacular (1815 academy); Federal (1815 house), Greek Revival (1837 "edifice"), Italianate (1855 gatehouse), Gothic Revival (1862 home), Queen Anne (1883 house); Romanesque (1889 hall), Castellated tower (1889 monument); Box truss (1895 observatory Beaux-Arts (1906 bank); Parkitecture (1933 station), Art deco (1938 armory) Modernist (1962 museum)
- MPS: Battle of Gettysburg MPS
- NRHP reference No.: 75000155
- Added to NRHP: March 19, 1975

Gettysburg Battlefield Historic District is a district of contributing properties and over 1000 historic contributing structures and 315 historic buildings, located in Adams County, Pennsylvania, United States. The district was added to the National Register of Historic Places on March 19, 1975. Most of the contributing elements of the Gettysburg Battlefield are on the protected federal property within the smaller Gettysburg National Military Park.

Historic structures include the Battle of Gettysburg monuments and memorials. Historic buildings range from a 1776 Colonial tavern to a vacant 1962 Modernist museum (Demolished in 2013). Contributing structures include postbellum artifacts such as the 1895 Big Round Top Observation Tower Foundation Ruin, the 1893 Electric Trolley Bed, and the only remaining Tipton Boundary Marker.

== History ==
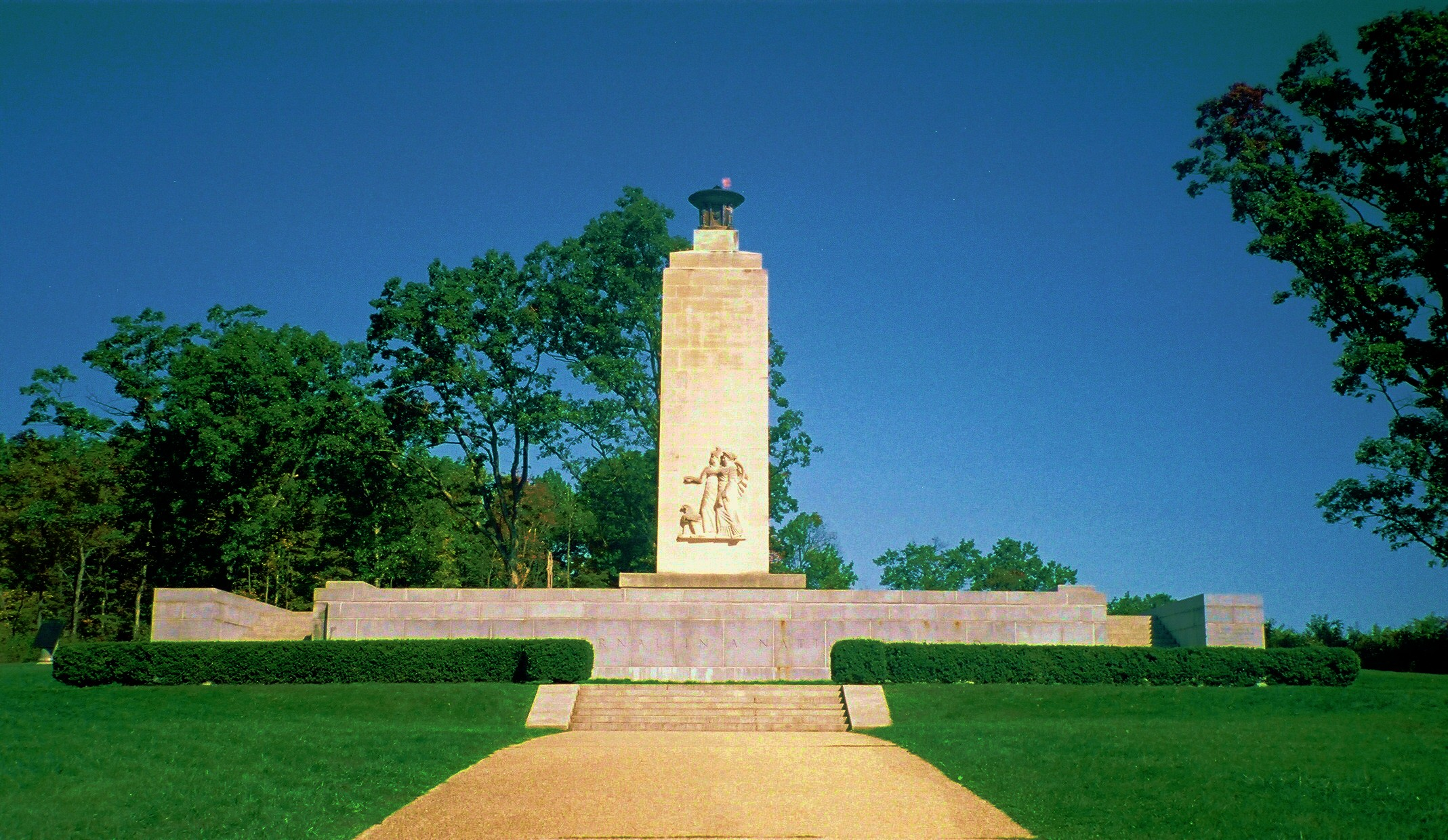
The Eternal Light Peace Memorial was unveiled at the 1938 Gettysburg reunion.

Historical events regarding the district's registered/documented properties include the famous 1863 Battle of Gettysburg and Gettysburg Address, and the subsequent Gettysburg Battlefield memorial development, historic commemorations, and addition of visitor services during the subsequent administrative eras. Events preceding the battle include the prehistoric geomorphological events which formed the battlefield terrain that was an integral part of the battle, as well as the construction of structures subsequently associated with the battle. Notable antebellum structures that no longer exist include the 1761 Samuel Gettys tavern, as well as the c. 1790 McAllister Mill along Rock Creek used by the Underground Railroad. The 1776 Dobbin House Tavern was outside of the borough when it was surveyed in 1785, and the 1786 Brafferton Inn (Hoke-Codori House) is the "oldest deeded house in downtown Gettysburg". The c. 1795 pub (Quinn's 1859 "Railroad Store", 1924 Mitchell's Restaurant) on the northeast of the center square subsequently burned and has been restored. By 1934, the first National Park Service Parkitecture of Gettysburg granite had been completed near The Pennsylvania State Memorial.

Official groupings of historical real estate tracts began with the 1864 Gettysburg Battlefield Memorial Association era, and continued with the initial United States Department of War acquisitions in 1893. The 1895 "Sickles Gettysburg Park Bill" (28 Stat. 651) designated the Gettysburg National Military Park (GNMP), which included areas outside of the battlefield (e.g., structures used as field hospitals) and which was transferred in 1933 to the 1916 National Park Service. The GNMP was added to the national register in 1966, and the Gettysburg Borough Council adopted a Historic District ordinance in 1972.

The historic district, which covers a larger area than either the national park or the battlefield, was designated via 2 multiple property submissions of contributing structures and properties, the first being the Battle of Gettysburg MPS on March 19, 1975. The list of classified structures was expanded from 618 to 1200 entries c. 1993, and the second MPS was dated January 23, 2004.

The Civil War Trust (a division of the American Battlefield Trust) and its partners have acquired and preserved 1,022 acres (4.14 km^{2}) within the battlefield historic district in more than 30 separate acquisitions since 1997. Some of these acres are now part of the Gettysburg National Military Park, but many continue to be owned by the Trust.

== See also ==
- Gettysburg Battlefield topics
- Historic American Buildings Survey in Pennsylvania
- Historic American Engineering Record in Pennsylvania
