= Greenmount, Pennsylvania =

Unincorporated community in Pennsylvania, US

Greenmount Green Mount
- Unincorporated community
- Location of Greenmount in Pennsylvania
- Coordinates: 39°45′51″N 077°16′25″W
- Country: United States
- State: Pennsylvania
- County: Adams
- Township: Cumberland
- Post office: 1864 April-1913 October 1; 39.76583°N 77.272339°W
- Elevation: 531 ft (162 m)
- Time zone: UTC-5 (EST)
  - Summer (DST): UTC-4 (EDT)
- ZIP code: 17325
- Area code: 717
- GNIS feature ID: 1176161

Greenmount is a populated place in Adams County, Pennsylvania, United States. It is located southwest of the Gettysburg Battlefield, at Marsh Creek along the Emmitsburg Road (U.S. Route 15 Business), in Cumberland Township.

Neighboring communities are Fairfield (west), Gettysburg (north), Round Top (northeast), Barlow (east), Harney, Maryland (southeast), and Fairplay (south).

== History ==
The 1814 Marsh Creek stone arch bridge on the Emmitsburg Road was replaced with a covered bridge before the battle and a subsequent 1921 concrete bridge. An XI Corps (Union Army) division passed through the covered bridge and used the adjacent muddy uphill road to the 1863 Battle of Gettysburg, but the two other divisions detoured from the former crossroad south of Greenmount to the Taneytown Rd on the east using the Marsh Creek fording downstream of Greenmount ("Witherow" mill in 1821, "W Myers Grist & Saw Mill" in 1858, "Myer's Mill" c. 1863). Upstream of the community and west of the former post office is the 1894 Cunningham Bridge on the National Register of Historic Places (closed c. 1997 and planned for demolition). Greenmount hosted the Pennsylvania welcome ceremony for the 1919 Motor Transport Corps convoy, which cooked lunch at McCurdy's Schoolhouse to the north.

In August 1922, the wooden Witherow Dam was demolished, and a replacement concrete dam and 20 acres (8.1 ha) upstream to the new bridge were used to establish a creekside park with baseball diamond. The park was named "Marsh Creek Heights" in September for ridges above both banks downstream of the bridge (cottages were subsequently built on the ridges), and a new dam was built in 1926 (repaired in 1930). The 1934 Greenmount Fire Company was organized at Marsh Creek Heights in Mrs Harvey Miller's stand, in 1939 the "Greenmount basketeers" lost to Gettysburg on the "CCC floor" (the CCC camp was at McMillan Woods), and in June 1949, a new baseball field with grandstand was built at Marsh Creek Heights.
