= Sachs Covered Bridge =

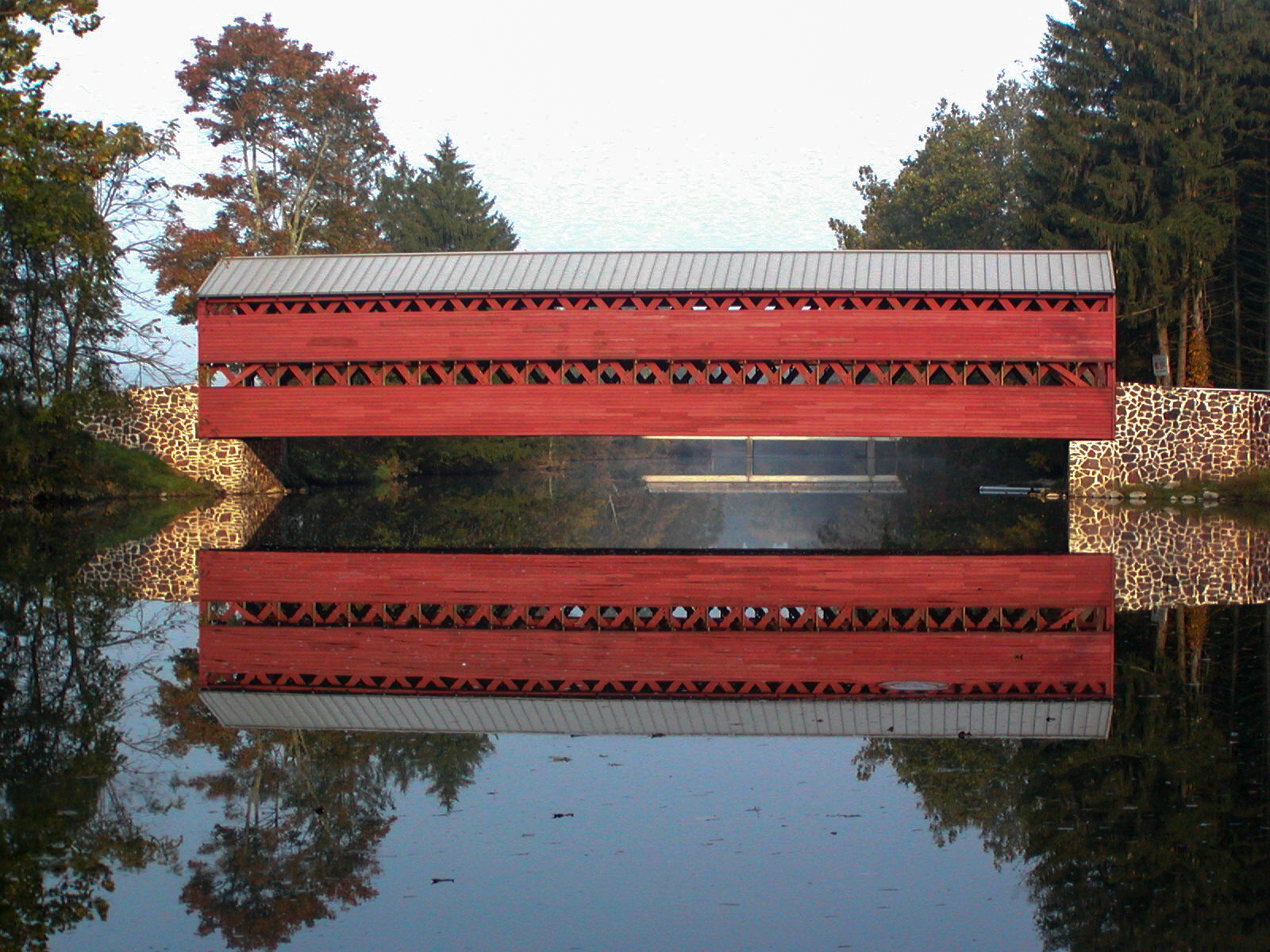
- Coordinates: 39°47′50.5″N 77°16′34″W
- Carries: Waterworks Road (TR 509 / TR 405)
- Crosses: Marsh Creek
- Locale: Adams, Pennsylvania, United States
- Other name: Sauck's
- Maintained by: Gettysburg Preservation Association
- WGCB #: 38-01-01

Characteristics
- Total length: 100 ft (30 m)
- Width: 15.3 ft (4.7 m)

History
- Constructed by: David S. Stoner
- Built: c. 1854
- Closed: May 9, 1968

U.S. National Register of Historic Places
- Designated: August 25, 1980

Pennsylvania Historical Marker
- Designated: July 20, 1997
- Sachs Covered Bridge
- U.S. National Register of Historic Places
- MPS: Covered Bridges of Adams, Cumberland, and Perry Counties TR
- NRHP reference No.: 80003395
- Added to NRHP: August 25, 1980

Location
- Interactive map of Sachs Covered Bridge

The Sachs Covered Bridge /ˈsɒks/, also known as Sauck's Covered Bridge and Waterworks Covered Bridge, is a 100-foot (30 m), Town truss covered bridge over Marsh Creek between Cumberland and Freedom Townships, Adams County in the U.S. state of Pennsylvania. The bridge was also known as the Sauches Covered Bridge at the time of the Battle of Gettysburg. It was listed on the National Register of Historic Places in 1980.

During the American Civil War, both the Union and Confederate Armies used the bridge in the Battle of Gettysburg and its aftermath. It is reportedly known to be severely haunted as a result.

== History ==
The Sachs Covered Bridge was built around 1854 at a cost of $1,544. On July 1, 1863, the bridge was crossed by the two brigades of the I Corps of the Union Army heading towards Gettysburg. The III Corps also crossed the bridge heading to the Black Horse Tavern. Four days later, the majority of General Robert E. Lee's Army of Northern Virginia retreated over the bridge after the Union victory in the Battle of Gettysburg.

The bridge was designated Pennsylvania's "most historic bridge" in 1938 by the predecessor of the Pennsylvania Department of Transportation, the Department of Highways. After a plan in 1960 to replace the bridge, the Cumberland Township officials voted to close the bridge to vehicular traffic, while leaving it open to pedestrians, on May 9, 1968. It was listed on the National Register of Historic Places on August 25, 1980.

On June 19, 1996, a flash flood knocked the bridge from one of its abutments and it incurred substantial damage; an iron bridge on the Marsh Creek was also heavily damaged and another destroyed. A $500,000 restoration on the bridge was already in progress before the flood; an additional $100,000 was raised to repair the damage incurred. The bridge was rededicated on July 21, 1997.

=== Waterworks ===
The Gettysburg Waterworks is the Marsh Creek site of freshwater for Gettysburg, Pennsylvania. Originally constructed in 1894, the works were rebuilt by the Pennsylvania Department of Health for the 1913 Gettysburg reunion, when the site had a pumping station, a filter plant, and 4 drilled wells (1 nearly dry). The reservoir is supplied by a 57.5 sq mi (149 km^{2}) drainage area that is upstream of the Sachs Covered Bridge.

== Design ==
The Sachs Covered Bridge is a Town truss covered bridge. The truss design was developed by Ithiel Town of Connecticut and consists of wooden beams "cris-crossed" to form a lattice. The bridge was one of few remaining Town truss bridges in Pennsylvania. The bridge is 100 feet (30 m) long and 15 feet 4 inches (4.67 m) wide.

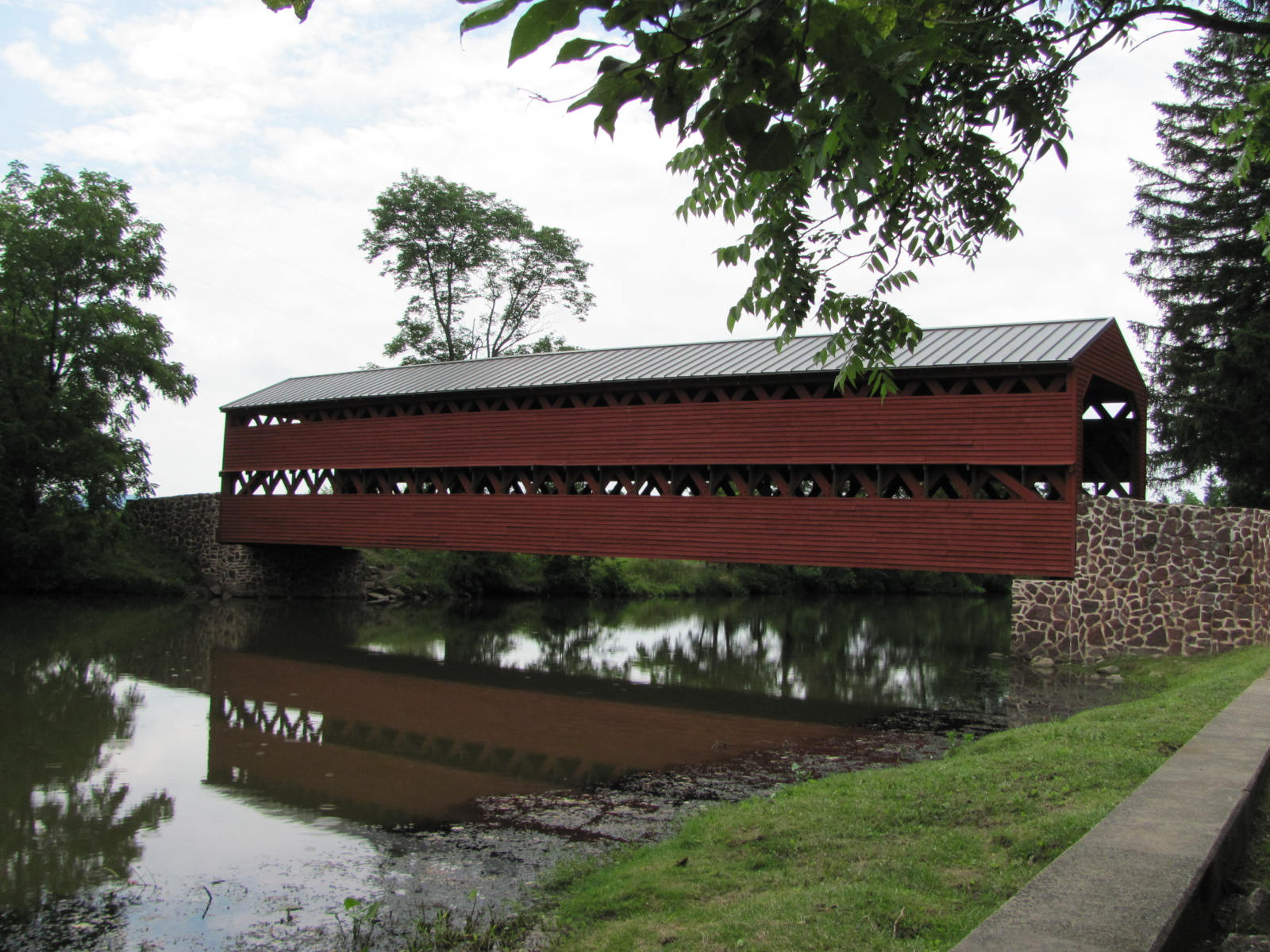

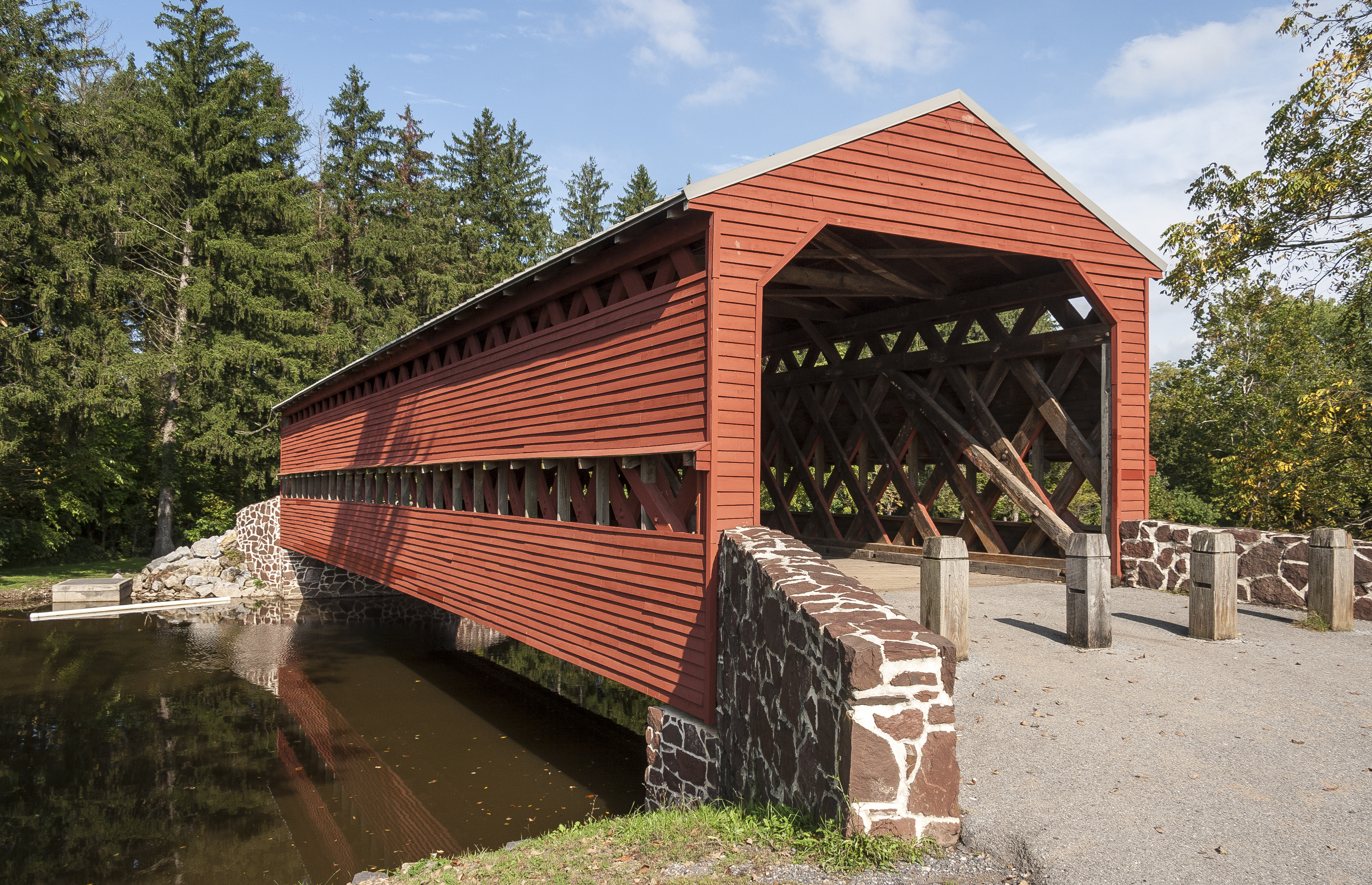

== See also ==
- List of bridges on the National Register of Historic Places in Pennsylvania
- National Register of Historic Places listings in Adams County, Pennsylvania
