= Freedom Township, Pennsylvania =

Freedom Township is the name of some places in the U.S. state of Pennsylvania:

- Freedom Township, Adams County, Pennsylvania
- Freedom Township, Blair County, Pennsylvania
