= Pennsylvania Hall =

Pennsylvania Hall may be:

- Pennsylvania Hall (Philadelphia)
- Pennsylvania Hall (Gettysburg, Pennsylvania)
- Pennsylvania Hall (Pittsburgh)
