= Rock Creek-White Run Union Hospital Complex =

- U.S. National Register of Historic Places
- U.S. Historic district
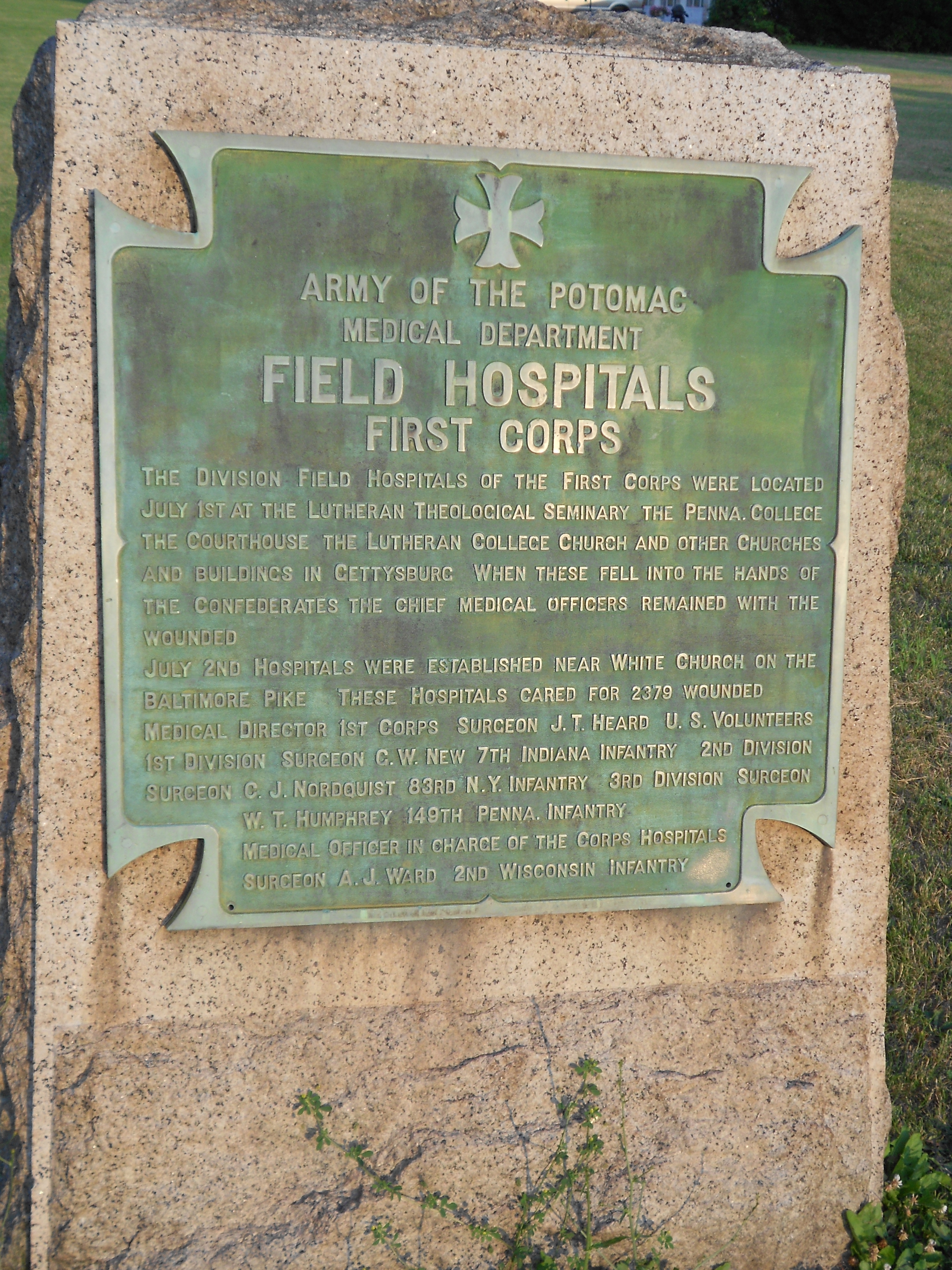

- Location within Pennsylvania Location within the United States
- Location: Baltimore Pike, Goulden Road, and White Church Road, near Mount Joy, Cumberland Township, Gettysburg, and Mount Joy Township, Pennsylvania
- Coordinates: 39°47′20″N 77°11′59″W
- Area: 550 acres (220 ha)
- Built: 1863
- Architectural style: Pennsylvania Farmhouse
- MPS: Adams County properties associated with the Battle of Gettysburg MPS
- NRHP reference No.: 00000520
- Added to NRHP: May 18, 2000

The Rock Creek-White Run Union Hospital Complex is a national historic district that is located in Cumberland Township, Gettysburg, and Mount Joy Township in Adams County, Pennsylvania, United States.

It was listed on the National Register of Historic Places in 2000.

== History and architectural features ==
This district includes eleven contributing buildings and thirteen contributing sites, on thirteen contiguous properties, including eight farmsteads and White's Church (or Marks German Reformed Church). The farmsteads are Schwartz Farm, Shaeffer Farm, Trostle Farm, Lewis Bushman Farm, Diener Farm, Conover Farm, Lightner Farm, and Beitler Farm. The properties served as hospitals during the American Civil War for the 1st, 2nd, 3rd, 5th, 6th, and 12th corps of the Army of the Potomac in the weeks immediately following July 1863's Battle of Gettysburg.

It was listed on the National Register of Historic Places in 2000.
