= Horner House and Barn =

Historic house in Pennsylvania, United States

- U.S. National Register of Historic Places
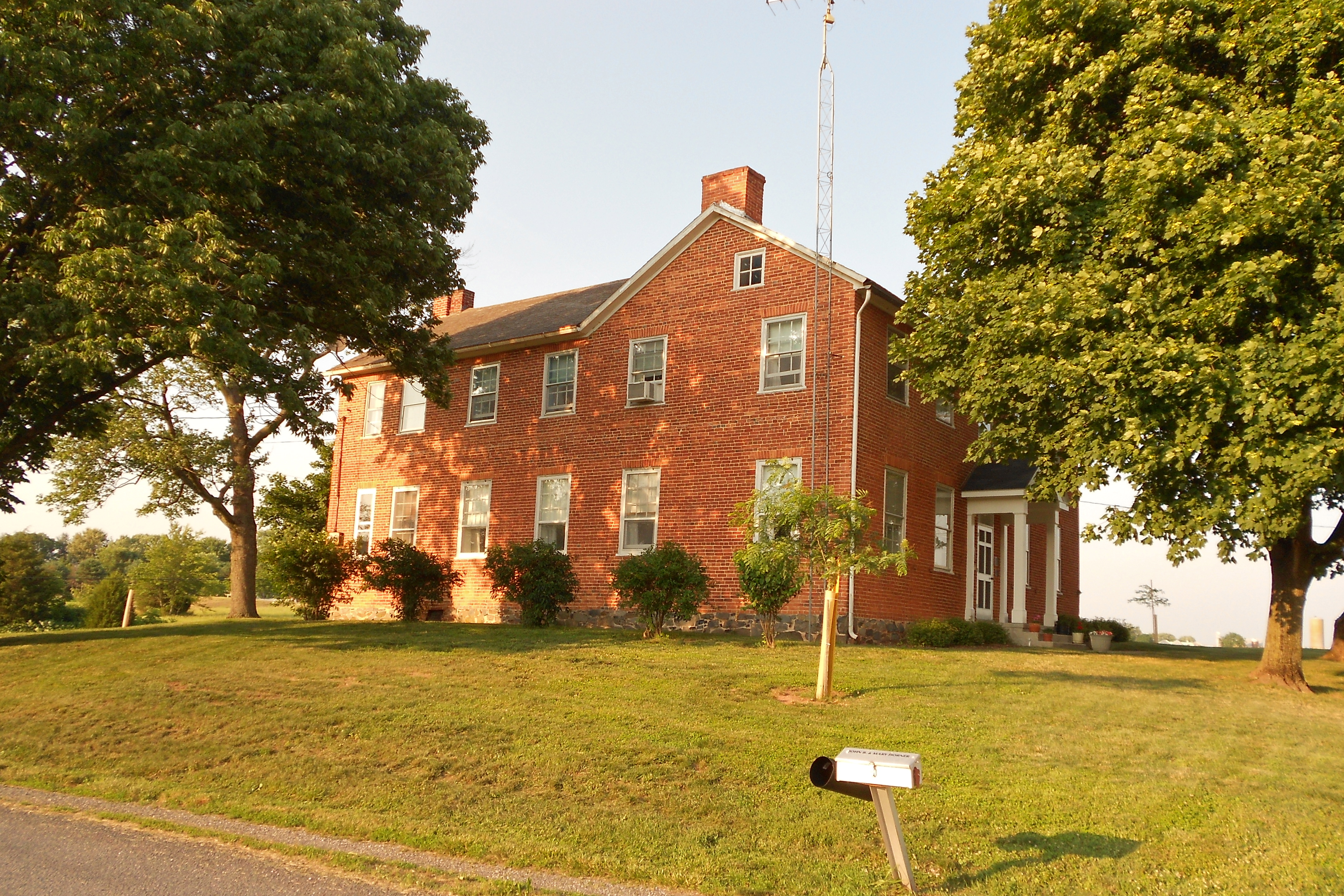
- House

- Location within Pennsylvania Location within the United States
- Location: 20 Horner Rd., Cumberland Township, Pennsylvania
- Coordinates: 39°43′41″N 77°14′59″W
- Area: 1.5 acres (0.61 ha)
- Built: 1819, 1840
- Built by: I. Lightner (1840 barn)
- Architectural style: Federal
- NRHP reference No.: 07000468
- Added to NRHP: May 24, 2007

The Horner House and Barn, also known as the Alexander Horner House and Locust Grive Farm, is an historic home and barn which are located in Cumberland Township, Adams County, Pennsylvania, United States.

This property was listed on the National Register of Historic Places in 2007.

== History and architectural features ==
The house was built in 1819, and is a 2 1/2-story, five-bay, vernacular, Federal-style dwelling. It has a main block and rear ell, and sits on an uncut fieldstone foundation. The bank barn was built in 1840, and has two levels; it measures 100.5 by 50 ft (30.6 by 15.2 m). Also located on the property is a contributing equipment barn, which was built in 1916, and an early nineteenth-century detached summer kitchen.

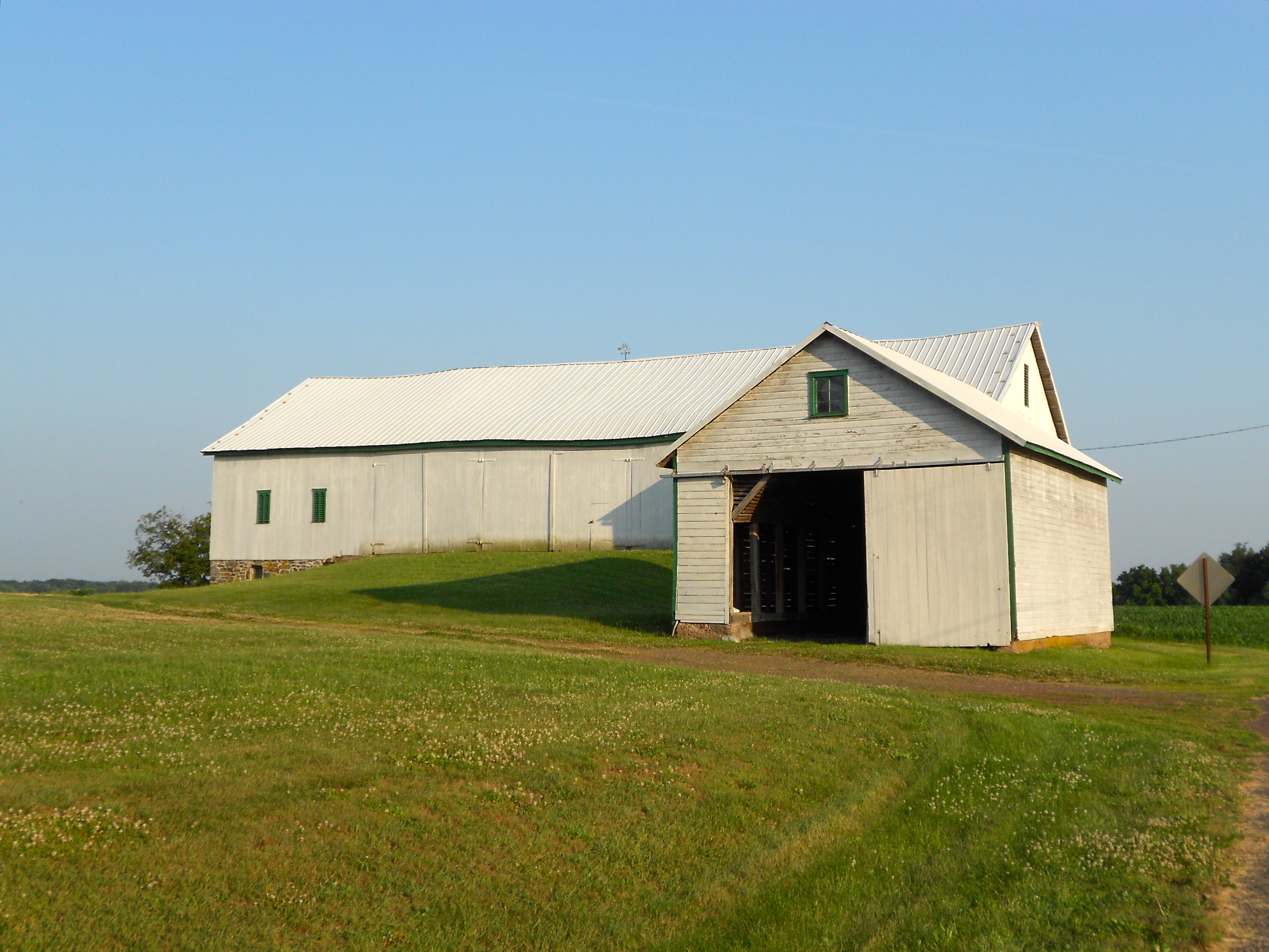
Barn

It was listed on the National Register of Historic Places in 2007.
