= Mason and Dixon West Line Milestone Markers 76 and 77 =

- U.S. National Register of Historic Places
- Location within Maryland Location within the United States
- Nearest city: Harney, Maryland
- Coordinates: 39°43′11.5″N 77°13′15″W
- Built: 1763-1768
- NRHP reference No.: 100002789
- Added to NRHP: August 21, 2018

The Mason and Dixon West Line Milestone Markers 76 and 77 are historic objects that are located in Frederick County, Maryland and Adams County, Pennsylvania, United States, near the community of Harney, Maryland. They are two of the original milestones that mark the Mason–Dixon line between the states of Maryland and Pennsylvania.

They were listed on the National Register of Historic Places on August 21, 2018.

== History and notable features ==
Oolite limestone was quarried and carved on the Isle of Portland in the English Channel. Both were part of the third shipment of milestones and they arrived in Baltimore in June 1767. Stones from this shipment were placed in 1767 to mark mile 64 and miles 66 through 132 on the West Line. Both of these sites were surveyed on August 24, 1765. Milestone 76 was set on October 13, 1767. Milestone 77 was set the following day 125 yards (114 m) to the east of its true location, which is in the middle of Marsh Creek. It is one of two milestones intentionally offset due to the challenges of its true location.

These milestones were originally 4.5 feet (1.4 m) long and 12 inches (30 cm) square and were capped with a low pyramidal top. When they were set, they stood 3 feet (0.91 m) above the ground. An "M" for Maryland was engraved on the south face and a "P" for Pennsylvania was carved on the north face. They were both embellished with decorative fluting, and were reset in 1902 at 1.5 feet (0.46 m) and 1.8 feet (0.55 m) respectively. Both are shorter now and some of their decorative elements are fainter after having been worn down by the elements.

The milestones were listed on the National Register of Historic Places on August 21, 2018. The National Register Listing was achieved through volunteer efforts that honored a final wish.
