= Eisenhower National Historic Site =

U.S. National Historic Site in Pennsylvania

- U.S. National Register of Historic Places
- U.S. National Historic Landmark
- U.S. National Historic Site
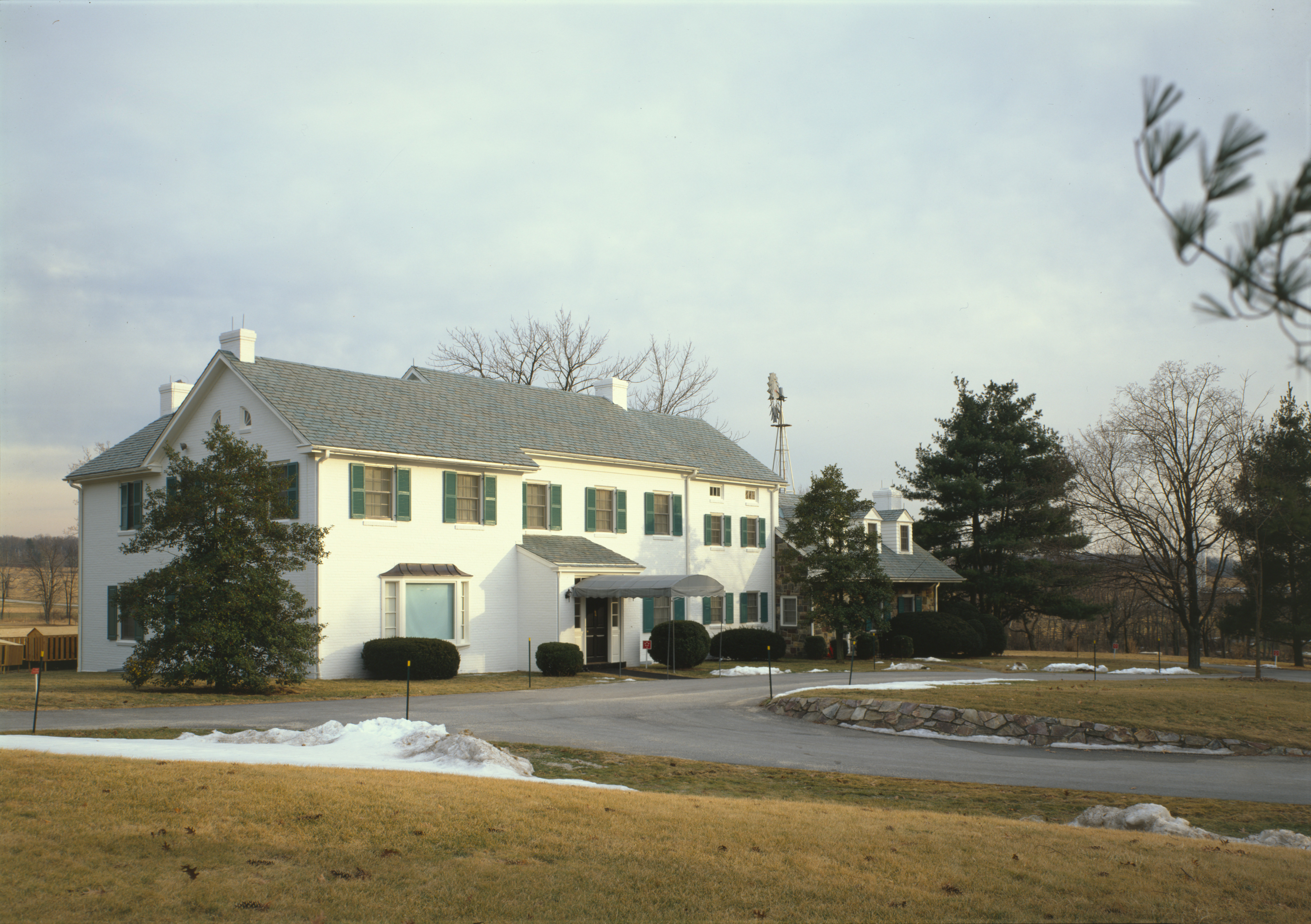
- HABS photo of the main house

- Location within Pennsylvania Location within the United States
- Location: Mostly Cumberland Township, Adams County, Pennsylvania, U.S.
- Coordinates: 39°47′36″N 77°15′48″W
- Area: 690.5 acres (279.4 ha)
- Visitation: 75,328 (2025)
- Website: Eisenhower National Historic Site
- NRHP reference No.: 67000017

Significant dates
- Added to NRHP: November 27, 1967
- Designated NHL: May 23, 1966

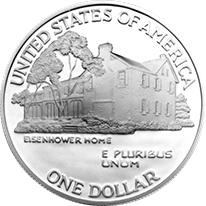
The home memorialized on the reverse of the 1990 Eisenhower Centennial silver dollar

Eisenhower National Historic Site preserves the home and farm of Dwight D. Eisenhower, the 34th president of the United States, and its surrounding property of 690.5 acres (279.4 ha). It is primarily located in Cumberland Township, Adams County, Pennsylvania, just outside Gettysburg. Purchased by then-General Eisenhower and his wife Mamie in 1950, the farm served as a weekend retreat when he became president in 1953 and a meeting place for world leaders, and became the Eisenhowers' home after they left the White House in 1961.

With its putting green, skeet range, and view of South Mountain and the Gettysburg Battlefield, it offered President Eisenhower a much-needed respite from the pressures of Washington. It was also a successful cattle operation, with a show herd of black Angus cattle. Some of the more notable of Eisenhower's guests were Premier Nikita Khrushchev of the Soviet Union, President Charles de Gaulle of France, Prime Minister Winston Churchill of Britain, and Governor Ronald Reagan of California (who later became president himself).

== History ==
Dwight D. ("Ike") Eisenhower had a long history with the Gettysburg area. His graduating class from West Point had visited the battlefield in 1915. In 1918, he was assigned to nearby Camp Colt in his first independent command as an army officer, commanding a tank training unit; he and Mamie Eisenhower were newly married.

Throughout his long army career, Dwight Eisenhower and his wife never had a house to call their own, with the couple moving from army post to army post. After he became Columbia University's president in 1948, Mamie requested that they finally have a place to call their own. A married couple who were friends with the Eisenhowers, George and Mary Allen, had recently purchased a small farm around Gettysburg, and recommended the area. In 1950, the Eisenhowers found a "run-down farm" on the outskirts of Gettysburg, and purchased the farm and its 189 acres (76 ha) for $40,000 (equal to $535,270 today) from one Allen Redding, who had owned the farm since 1921. Eisenhower stated that he could feel the "forgotten heroisms" that occurred on the grounds during the Battle of Gettysburg.

When purchased, the 189 acres (76 ha) included 600 chickens, 25 cows, and many dilapidated buildings dating back to the 18th and 19th centuries. Renovation of the property was delayed when Eisenhower became supreme commander of the North Atlantic Treaty Organization in 1951. After he had attained the presidency of the United States in 1953, Mamie had him rebuild the old house. Much of the original building had to be torn down, due to its deterioration. The total cost of renovation was $250,000 (equal to $3,008,396 today). This large expense was due partly to Mamie's whims, but also to Eisenhower's employment of union labor; he spent $65,000 (equal to $782,183 today) for union workmen who came each day from Washington, D.C. (75 miles (121 km) away) to work on the farmhouse. On their 1955 wedding anniversary, the Eisenhowers held a party to celebrate completion of the work. The entire staff of the White House were invited, attending in two shifts, so that the White House would not be unstaffed. The staff were forever grateful to the Eisenhowers for including them in the festivities.

From its completion in 1955 to the end of Eisenhower's second term on January 20, 1961, the president spent 365 days total on the Gettysburg farm. The longest of these stays was 38 days in late 1955, while recovering from a heart attack he had suffered that September. After 1955, the Eisenhowers spent most weekends and summer vacations at the Gettysburg farm. They sometimes went to both the Gettysburg farm and Camp David, prompting one person to call Camp David "an annex to Gettysburg".

The Gettysburg farm provided a few headaches. Democrats chose the amount of time the Eisenhowers spent at the Gettysburg farm as another way to attack him. Paul M. Butler, head of the Democratic National Committee, called him a part-time president due to his many stays in Gettysburg. When his World War II colleague Bernard Montgomery visited the farm, Eisenhower commented to Montgomery (speaking as military commander to military commander) that he would have fired a subordinate that would initiate Pickett's Charge. Many Southerners saw this as disrespect toward Robert E. Lee, and protested. Soviet premier Nikita Khrushchev visited the farm in September 1959, and was "grandfathery" to the Eisenhower grandchildren. David Eisenhower said that Khrushchev was such a nice guy, he (David) could become a communist if he did not know better, causing much embarrassment to the Eisenhowers.

The Eisenhowers donated their home and farm (230 acres (93 ha) total at the time) to the National Park Service in 1967, with lifetime living rights for the former president. Two years later, Eisenhower died at the age of 78. Mamie Eisenhower rejected the idea of moving to Washington to be closer to family and friends and, with federal permission, lived on the farm until her death in 1979, although the living area for Mamie was reduced to 14 acres (5.7 ha). The National Park Service opened the site in 1980.

== Grounds ==
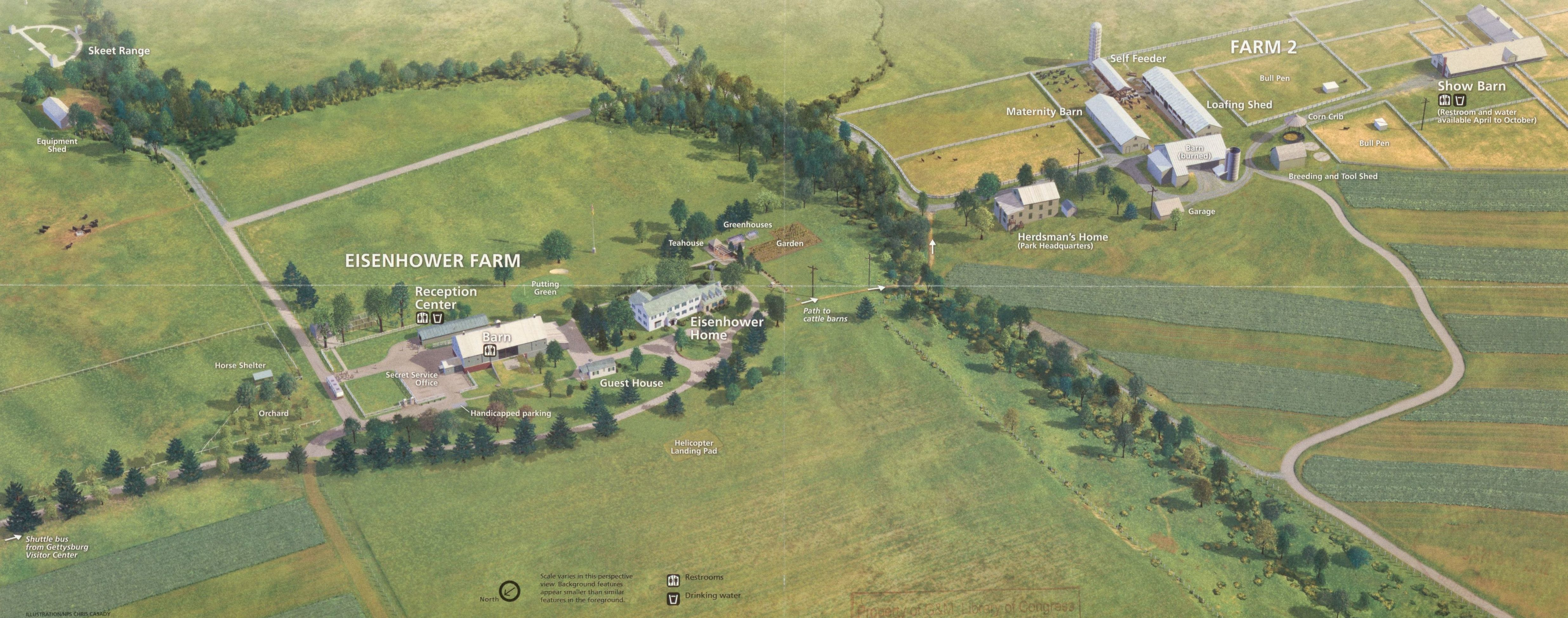
National Park Service illustration of the grounds of the site

It is primarily located in Cumberland Township, Adams County, Pennsylvania, A portion of the grounds extends into Freedom Township.

The plans for decoration and construction of the house were dictated by Mamie Eisenhower. At one point, Eisenhower told the contractor "For God's sakes, just give her what she wants and send me the bill." His main concern was personally mixing the paint to recolor the barn, which had a red coat he thought was hideous, so he painted it a light gray green. Mamie, meanwhile, was delighted in being able to use everything they always had in storage, and decorated more for sentimentality than for aesthetics.

Cattle were raised at the farm. Eisenhower would often poke the rump of a bull with his shotgun to show what quality of steak the animal would eventually produce, alarming the Secret Service agents who were protecting him. Once, while barbecuing (something he loved to do on the farm), he made the mistake of announcing which cow he was cooking. As it had been the favorite cow of his granddaughter Susan Eisenhower, she was brought to tears.

A row of fifty Norway spruce trees lines the main driveway leading to the farm. These trees represent the fifty U.S. states, and were given to Eisenhower as birthday presents from each of the state Republican Party chairmen in 1955. The furthest one from the house was the tree representing Texas, and it was seen as a mark of Eisenhower's recovery that he was able to walk that far after his heart attack.

The Eisenhowers (especially Dwight in the beginning) spent most of their time in a glass-covered porch overlooking Seminary Ridge. Reading and playing cards with friends were popular pastimes on the porch; it was said that he would sit for hours reflecting on his life and legacy.

== Today ==
The Eisenhower National Historic Site is open daily from 9:00 am to 5:00 pm, except for Thanksgiving, Christmas and New Year's Day. The home, grounds, barns and cattle operation are available for public tours. Visitors may reach the site via a shuttle bus which departs from the Gettysburg National Military Park Visitor Center. The total land area is 690 acres (280 ha). There are two films about the grounds and President Eisenhower's life.

Eisenhower National Historic Site

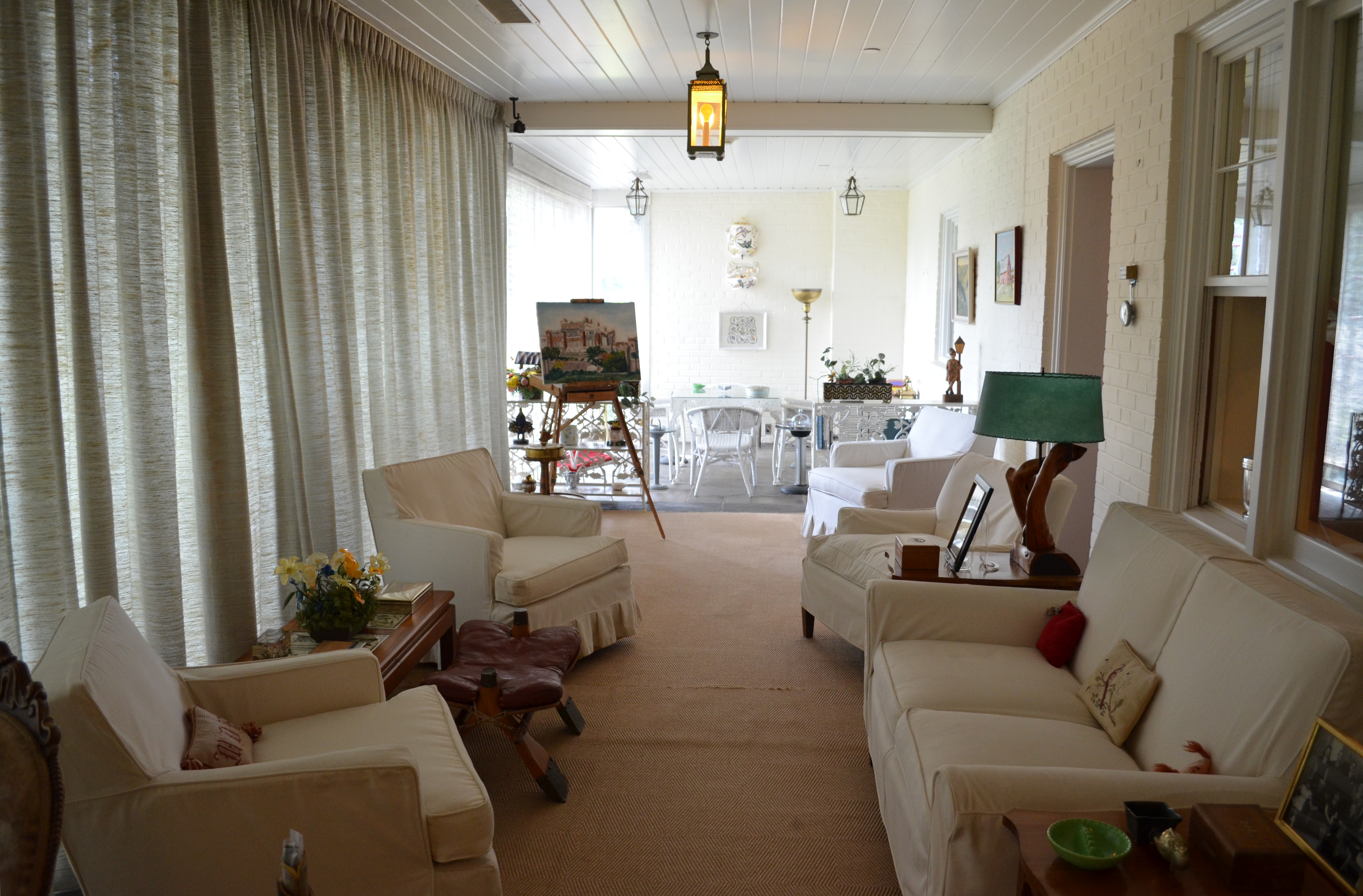
Porch

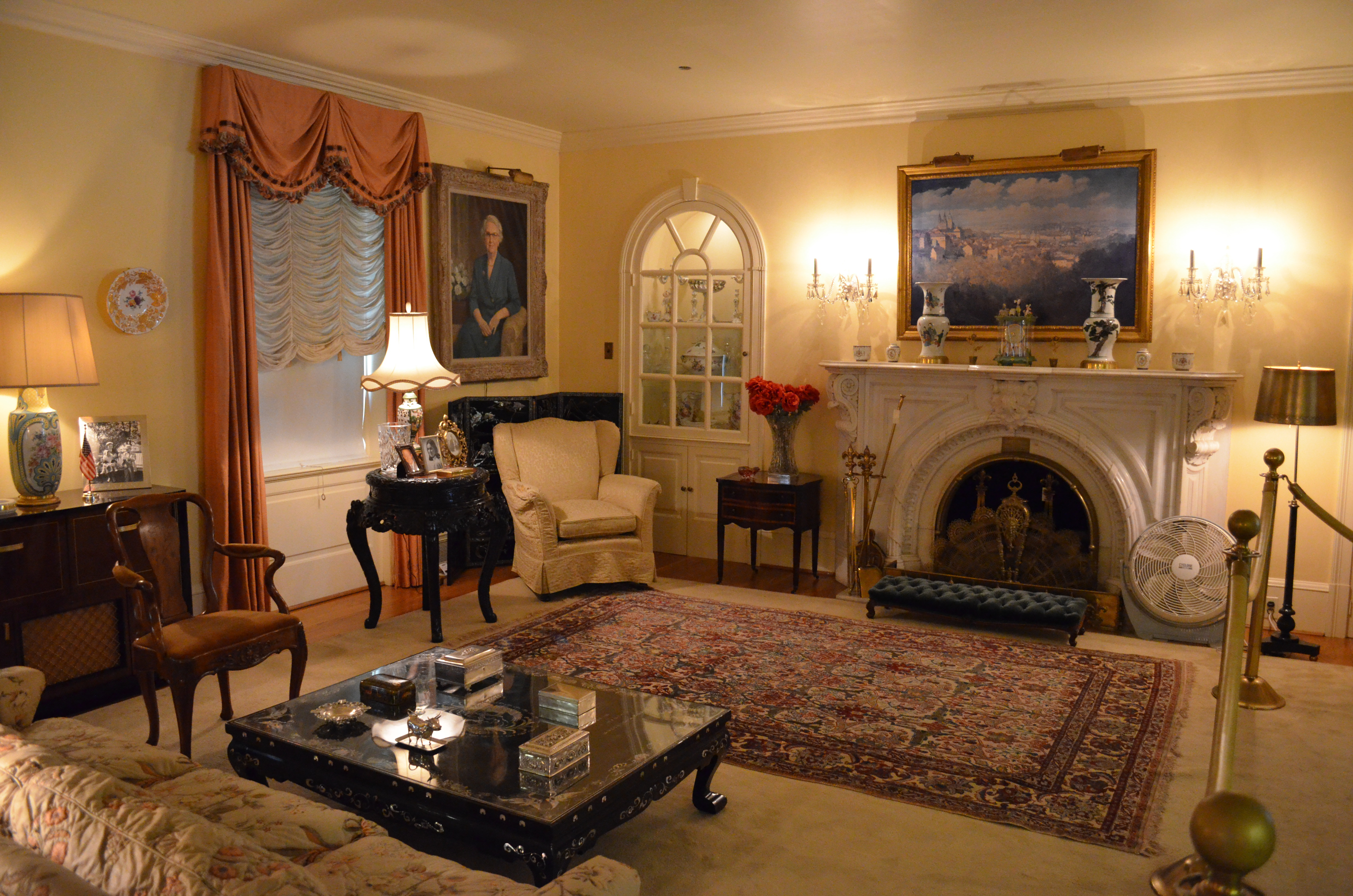
Living room

== See also ==
- List of residences of presidents of the United States
- Presidential memorials in the United States
- National Register of Historic Places listings in Adams County, Pennsylvania
- List of National Historic Landmarks in Pennsylvania
