= Black Horse Tavern (Gettysburg, Pennsylvania) =

- U.S. National Register of Historic Places
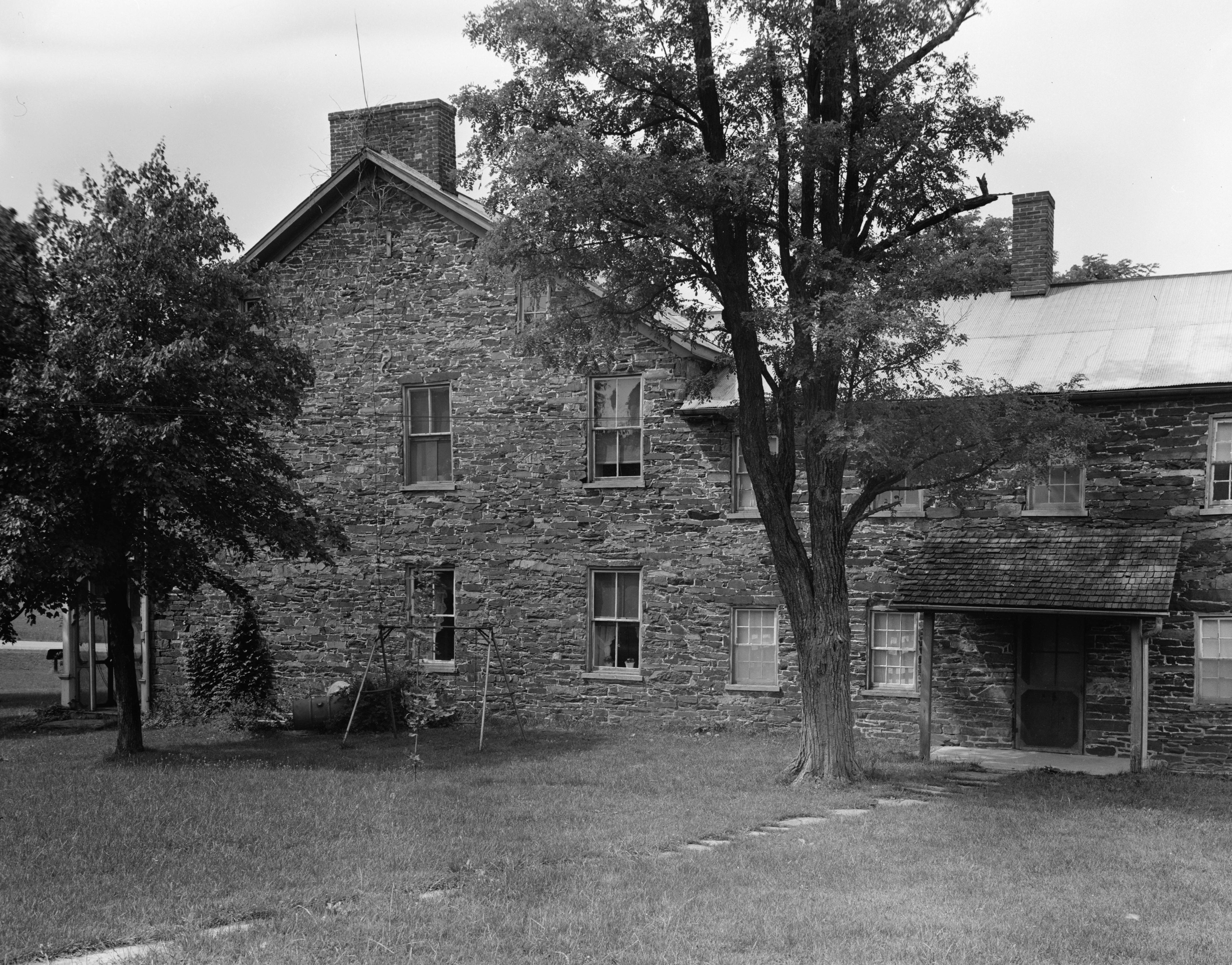
- Two-story former tavern with addition

- Location within Pennsylvania Location within the United States
- Location: 83 Black Horse Tavern Road, Cumberland Township
- Coordinates: 39°49′08″N 77°17′00″W
- Area: 0.5 acres (0.20 ha)
- Built: 1812
- NRHP reference No.: 78002331 (GNIS ID #: 1203112)
- Added to NRHP: March 30, 1978

The Black Horse Tavern (Bream's Tavern) is a large stone residence at the Pennsylvania Route 116 intersection with a north-south road at Marsh Creek. The tavern was used as for approximately 65 years before 1909, the mill tract rented by William E. Myers was used as a Battle of Gettysburg field hospital.

== History ==
Built in 1812 along the 1791 Nichol's Gap Road (c. 1869 Fairfield and Gettysburg Turnpike), "Francis Bream purchased the farm and tavern in 1843." During the 1863 Battle of Gettysburg the intersection was a maneuver point for Confederate artillery (the Hagerstown Road forded Marsh Creek). A stone arch roadway bridge was subsequently built at the tavern and in 1927, the highway near the structure was rerouted from over Bream's Hill to an excavation of the new Fairfield Road with a new bridge at "Plank's".

External image
- GettysburgDaily.com images
