= Sheads House =

Historic house in Pennsylvania, United States

- U.S. National Register of Historic Places
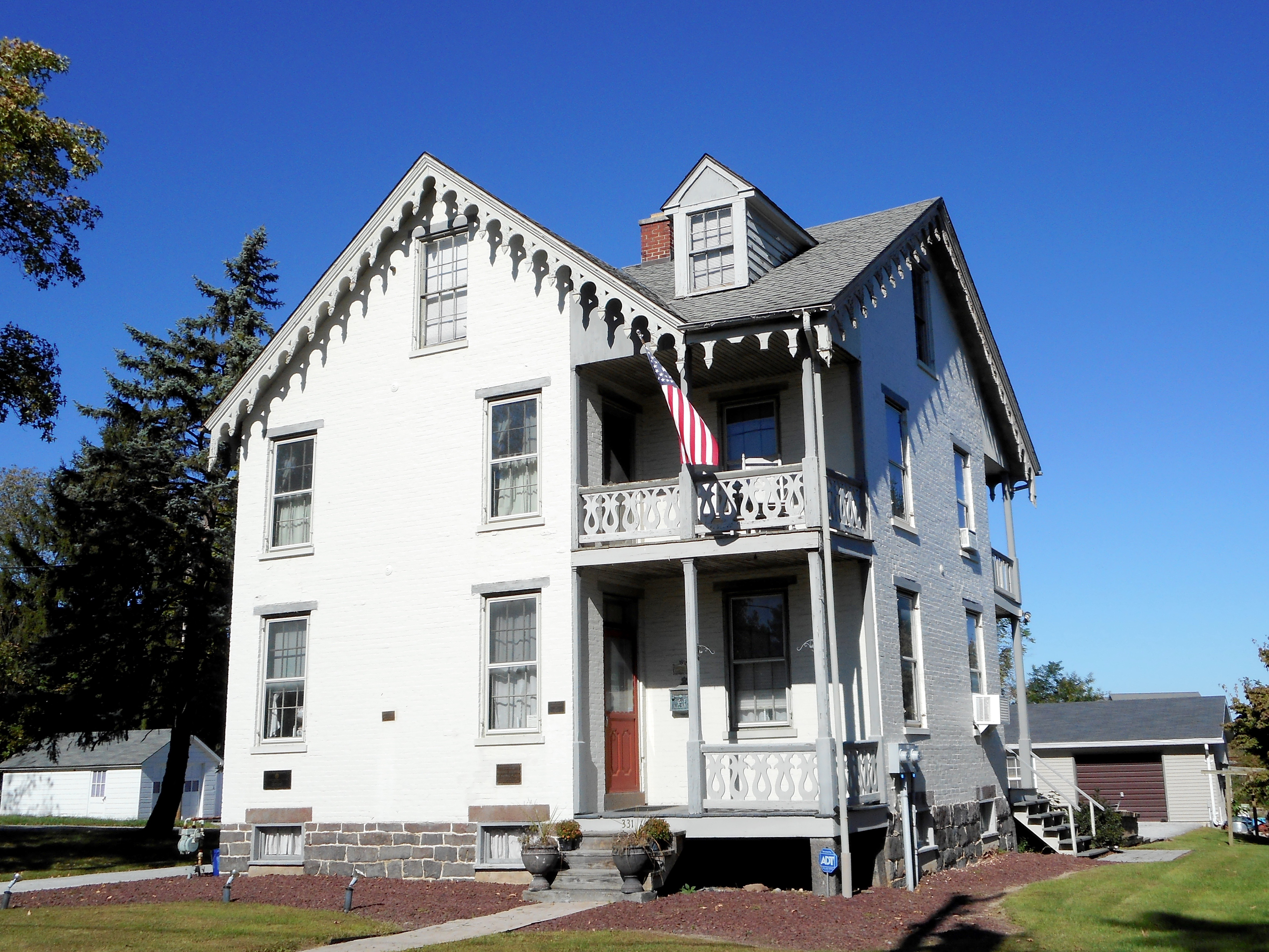
- Sheads House, 2017

- Location within Pennsylvania Location within the United States
- Location: 331 Buford Ave., Gettysburg, Pennsylvania
- Coordinates: 39°50′2.4″N 77°14′34.2″W
- Area: 0.3 acres (0.12 ha)
- Built: 1862
- Architectural style: Gothic Revival
- NRHP reference No.: 76001592
- Added to NRHP: December 8, 1976

The Sheads House, also known as Oak Ridge Seminary, is an historic home that is located in Gettysburg in Adams County, Pennsylvania, United States.

It was listed on the National Register of Historic Places in 1976.

== History and architectural features ==
Built in 1862, this historic structure is a 2 1/2-story, T-shaped, brick dwelling that was designed in the Gothic Revival style. It sits on a granite foundation, has a cross gable roof, and features an ornamental fascia board and porches with ornamental balustrades. Shortly after it was built, it housed the Oak Ridge Seminary, a girls' school.

During the Battle of Gettysburg, it was used as a hospital for Confederate States Army wounded.

It was listed on the National Register of Historic Places in 1976. It is located in the Gettysburg Battlefield Historic District.

== Gallery ==
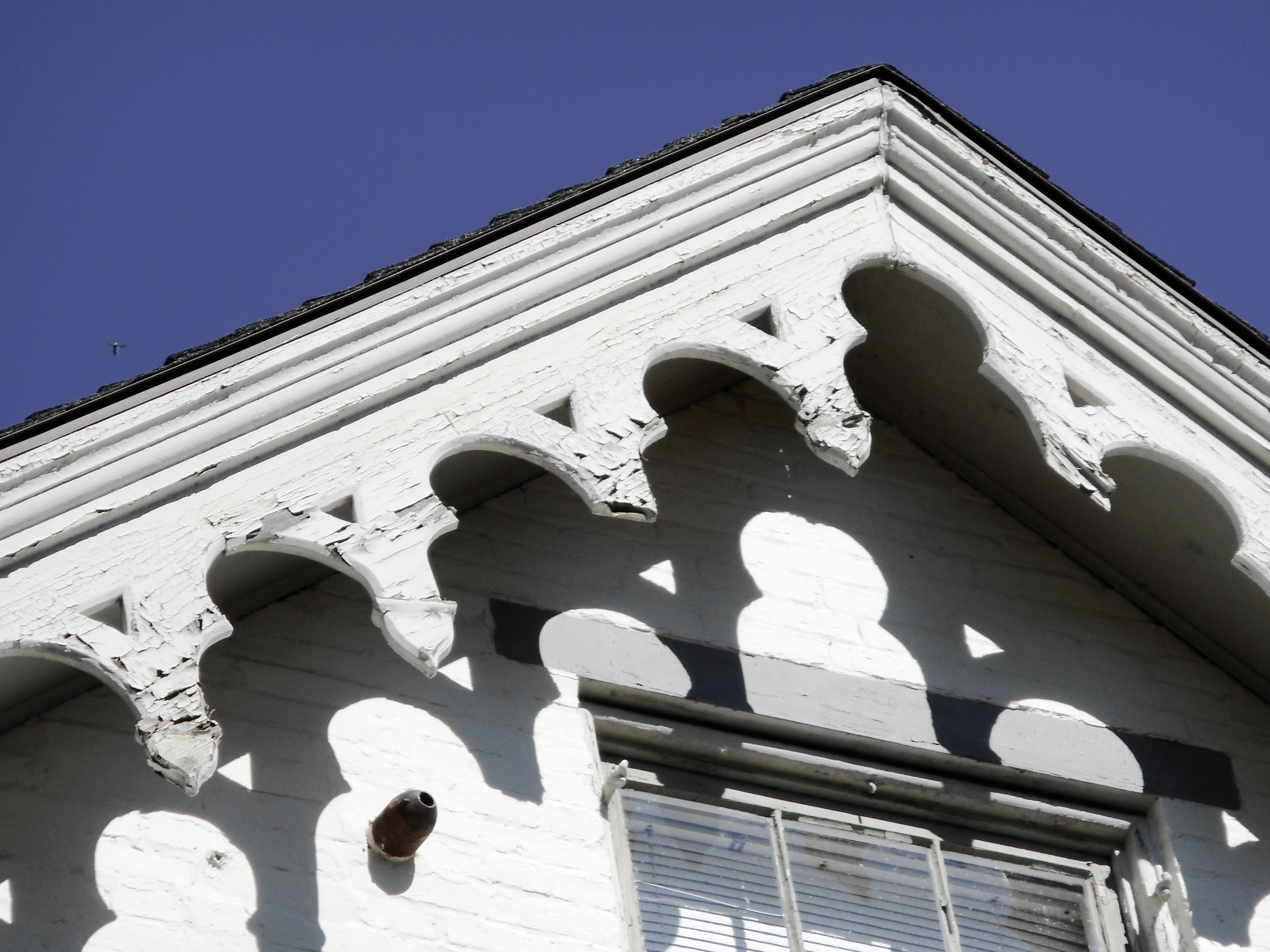
Shell embedded in the wall to the left of the window

== See also ==
- National Register of Historic Places listings in Adams County, Pennsylvania
