= 44th New York Monument =

Gettysburg Battlefield memorial

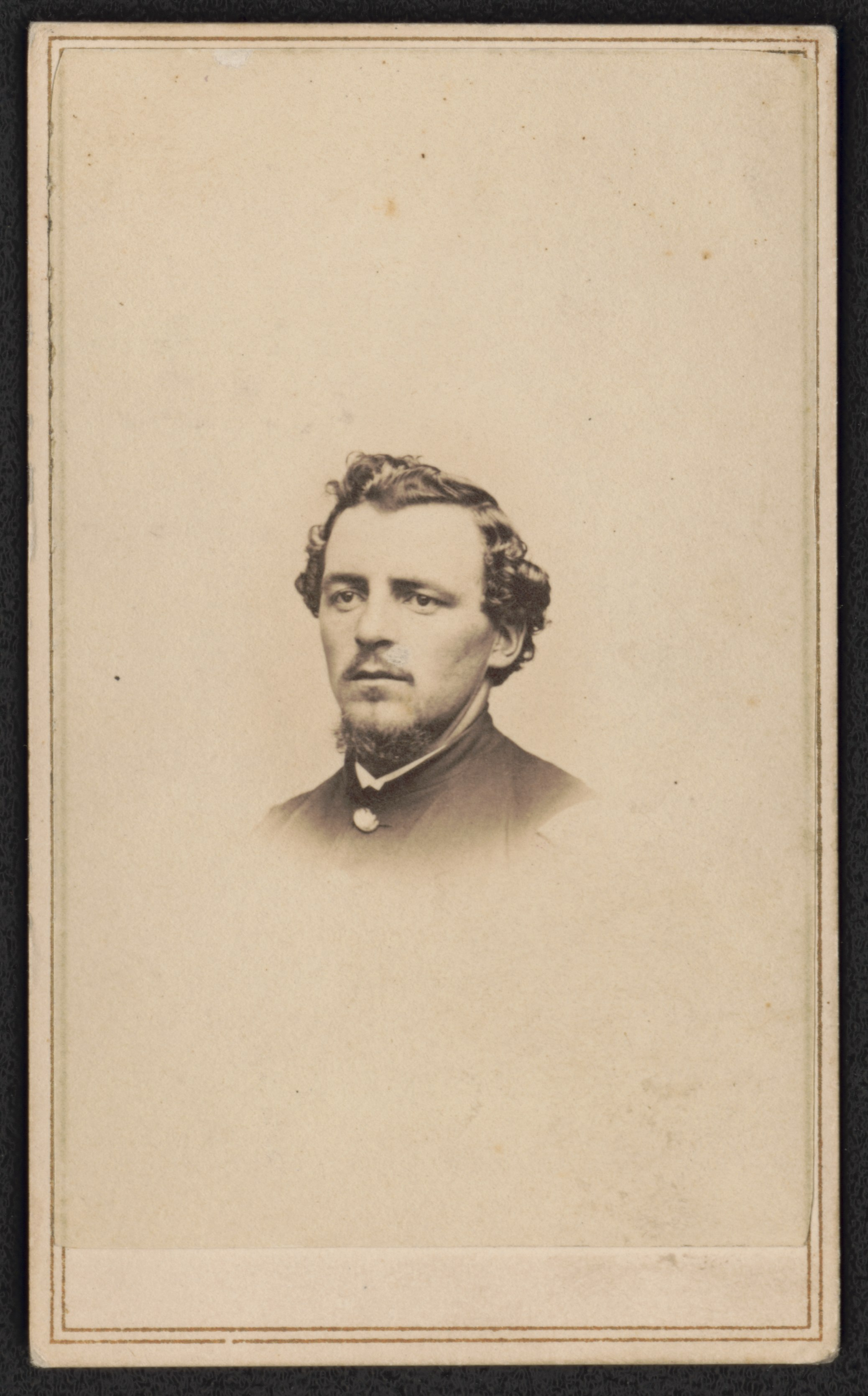
Captain Charles D. Grannis of Co. A, B, and H, 44th New York Infantry Regiment

The 44th and 12th New York Infantry Monument (39°47.475′N 77°14.221′W) is a Gettysburg Battlefield memorial erected near the summit of Little Round Top to commemorate combat in the Battle of Little Round Top. The castellated building is the largest monument to a regiment on the battlefield, is the 1st of only 2 Battle of Gettysburg memorials with observation decks (cf. 1910 The Pennsylvania State Memorial), and supplemented the Gettysburg Battlefield Memorial Association wooden towers on Big Round Top and East Cemetery Hill (replaced in 1895 with 2 observation towers at Big Round Top and at Culp's Hill). The July 3, 1893, memorial dedication was the site of an altercation against photographer William H. Tipton by Gen. Sickles, who was served a court writ the following day and was forced out of the New York Monuments Commission in 1912 after malfeasance.

== Description ==
The 44 ft × 12 ft (13.4 m × 3.7 m) tower is 44 ft (13 m) tall, is the oldest on the battlefield and has a spiral staircase to the 2nd floor observation deck with parapets. The memorial is crowned with a maltese cross and has numerous interior and exterior bronze tablets which include 2 bas-reliefs of Generals Daniel Butterfield and Francis C. Barlow. The ground level landing has 2 arched entrances with steps at the end of paved pathways from the Sykes Avenue parking lot. On the south slope above the saddle between the Little and Big Round Tops, the west side is maintained free of trees to allow clear viewing of Devil's Den, the Slaughter Pen, and the Valley of Death with Plum Run.

External images
- Find a Grave images
- Historical marker database image
- NY St military museum image
- Stone Sentinels image
- angled south wall
- close-up images of sculptures
