= John Zeigler Farm House =

Historic house in Pennsylvania, United States

- U.S. National Register of Historic Places
- Location within Pennsylvania Location within the United States
- Location: 1281 Mountain Rd., York Springs, Latimore Township, Pennsylvania
- Coordinates: 40°2′56″N 77°7′2″W
- Area: less than one acre
- Built: 1817
- Architectural style: Federal
- NRHP reference No.: 92000395
- Added to NRHP: May 7, 1992

John Zeigler Farm House is a historic home located at Latimore Township, Adams County, Pennsylvania, United States. It was built in 1817, and is a 2 1/2-story, 3-bay brick Federal style dwelling with a Georgian plan. It has a main block and rear ell, both with gabled ends.

It was listed on the National Register of Historic Places in 1992.
