= Conewago Mass House =

- Formerly listed on the U.S. National Register of Historic Places
- Location: North of McSherrystown on Pennsylvania Route 476, Conewago Township, Adams County, Pennsylvania
- Area: 0.3 acres (0.12 ha)
- NRHP reference No.: 78002332

Significant dates
- Added to NRHP: October 19, 1978
- Removed from NRHP: January 11, 1996

The Conewago Mass House was a historic church building located at Conewago Township, Adams County, Pennsylvania, United States. It was built in the 1730s, and was a two and one half story stone house with a steep gable roof and two interior gable end brick chimneys.

It was listed on the National Register of Historic Places in 1978, and delisted in 1996, after being destroyed by fire.
