= Freedom Township, Adams County, Pennsylvania =

Township in Pennsylvania, US

Coordinates: 39°45′59″N 77°17′53″W

- Township
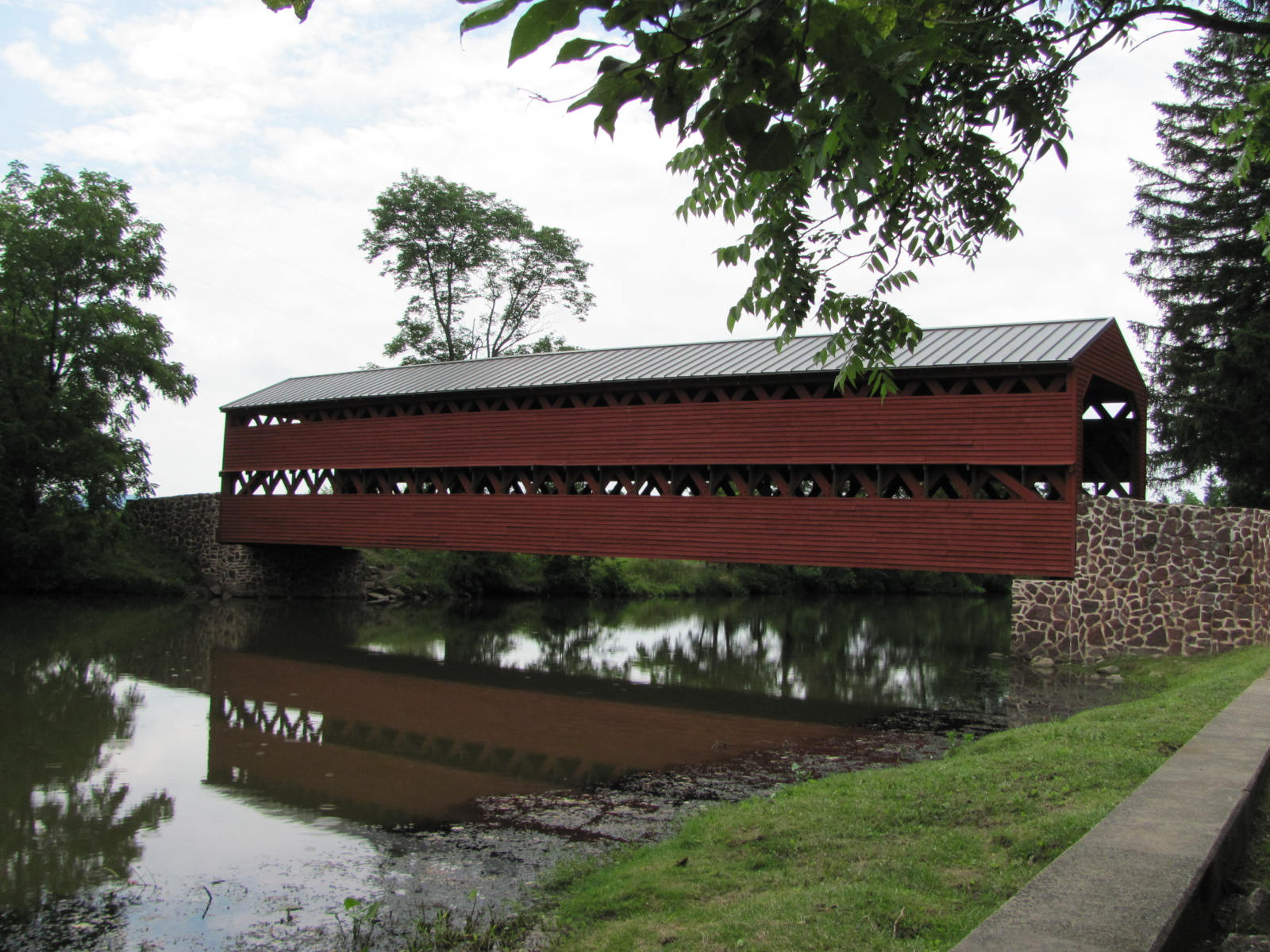
- Sachs Covered Bridge

- Location in Adams County and the state of Pennsylvania.
- Country: United States
- State: Pennsylvania
- County: Adams
- Settled: 1739
- Incorporated: 1838

Area
  - Total: 14.02 sq mi (36.30 km^{2})
  - Land: 13.95 sq mi (36.14 km^{2})
  - Water: 0.066 sq mi (0.17 km^{2})

Population (2020)
  - Total: 822
  - Estimate (2023): 835
  - Density: 60.1/sq mi (23.22/km^{2})
- Time zone: UTC-5 (Eastern (EST))
  - Summer (DST): UTC-4 (EDT)
- Area code: 717
- FIPS code: 42-001-27704
- Website: http://www.freedomtownship.us/

Freedom Township is a township in Adams County, Pennsylvania, United States. The population was 822 at the 2020 census.

A portion of Eisenhower National Historic Site extends into Freedom Township.

== Geography ==
According to the United States Census Bureau, the township has a total area of 14.0 square miles (36.3 km^{2}), of which 13.9 square miles (36.1 km^{2}) is land and 0.077 square miles (0.2 km^{2}), or 0.47%, is water.

== Demographics ==
Historical population
Census	Pop.	Note	%±
2000	844		—
2010	831		−1.5%
2020	822		−1.1%
2023 (est.)	835		1.6%
U.S. Decennial Census

As of the census of 2000, there were 844 people, 328 households, and 247 families residing in the township. The population density was 60.7 inhabitants per square mile (23.4/km^{2}). There were 376 housing units at an average density of 27.0 per square mile (10.4/km^{2}). The racial makeup of the township was 97.27% White, 0.71% African American, 0.59% Asian, 0.47% from other races, and 0.95% from two or more races. Hispanic or Latino of any race were 1.78% of the population.

There were 328 households, out of which 29.3% had children under the age of 18 living with them, 68.3% were married couples living together, 5.5% had a female householder with no husband present, and 24.4% were non-families. 18.0% of all households were made up of individuals, and 5.2% had someone living alone who was 65 years of age or older. The average household size was 2.57 and the average family size was 2.97.

In the township the population was spread out, with 22.2% under the age of 18, 7.0% from 18 to 24, 24.9% from 25 to 44, 36.7% from 45 to 64, and 9.2% who were 65 years of age or older. The median age was 42 years. For every 100 females there were 100.0 males. For every 100 females age 18 and over, there were 100.9 males.

The median income for a household in the township was $47,778, and the median income for a family was $52,188. Males had a median income of $33,214 versus $25,125 for females. The per capita income for the township was $23,005. About 3.6% of families and 6.3% of the population were below the poverty line, including 3.8% of those under age 18 and 12.7% of those age 65 or over.

== Education ==
It is in the Gettysburg Area School District. The district's comprehensive middle and high schools are Gettysburg Area Middle School and Gettysburg Area High School.
