= Adams County Courthouse (Pennsylvania) =

- U.S. National Register of Historic Places
- Pennsylvania state historical marker
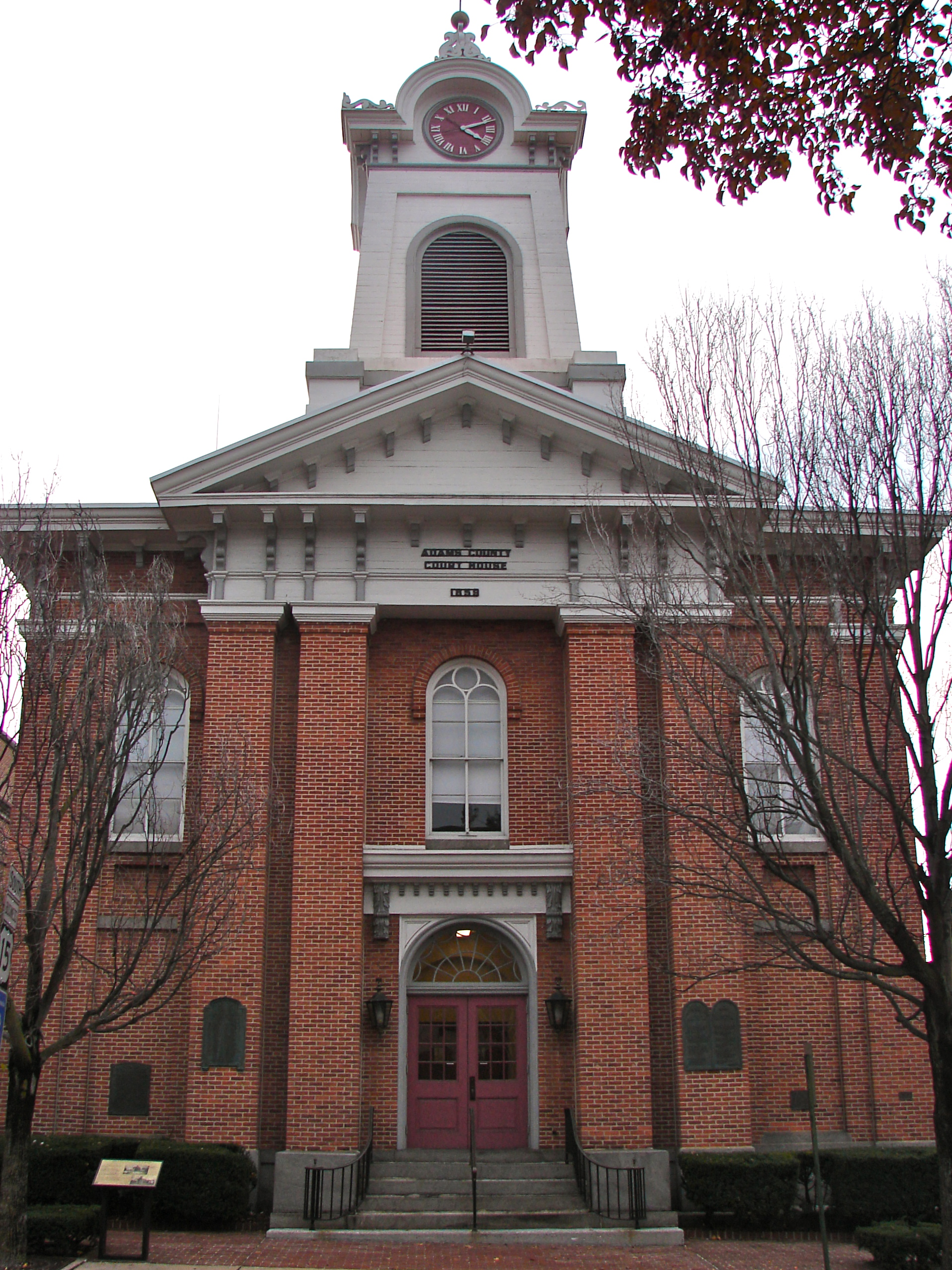

- Location within Pennsylvania Location within the United States
- Interactive map showing the location of Adams County Courthouse
- Location: Baltimore and W. Middle Sts., Gettysburg, Pennsylvania
- Coordinates: 39.829568°N 77.231452°W
- Area: 1 acre (0.40 ha)
- Built: 1858
- Architect: Stephen Decatur Button; John R. Turner (builder)
- Architectural style: Italianate
- NRHP reference No.: 74001728

Significant dates
- Added to NRHP: October 1, 1974
- Designated PHMC: September 01, 1954

The Adams County Courthouse is located in Gettysburg, Pennsylvania, United States. It was added to the National Register of Historic Places on October 1, 1974.

== History and architectural features ==
Built in 1858, the Adams County Courthouse was first occupied in 1859. The architect was Stephen Decatur Button of Philadelphia, with John R. Turner of Carlisle implementing its construction.

The courthouse is two stories high, three bays wide, six bays deep and constructed of red brick, which was originally painted gray. Rear wings were added in 1895. A large clock tower reaches about 70 feet (21 m) above ground level. During the Battle of Gettysburg the building served as both a command post and as a hospital, for both Union and Confederate armies.

The Adams County Courthouse was added to the National Register of Historic Places on October 1, 1974.

== See also ==
- Adams County, Pennsylvania
- National Register of Historic Places listings in Adams County, Pennsylvania
- List of state and county courthouses in Pennsylvania
