= Dobbin House Tavern =

Historic house in Pennsylvania, United States

- Dobbin House
- U.S. National Register of Historic Places
- Pennsylvania state historical marker
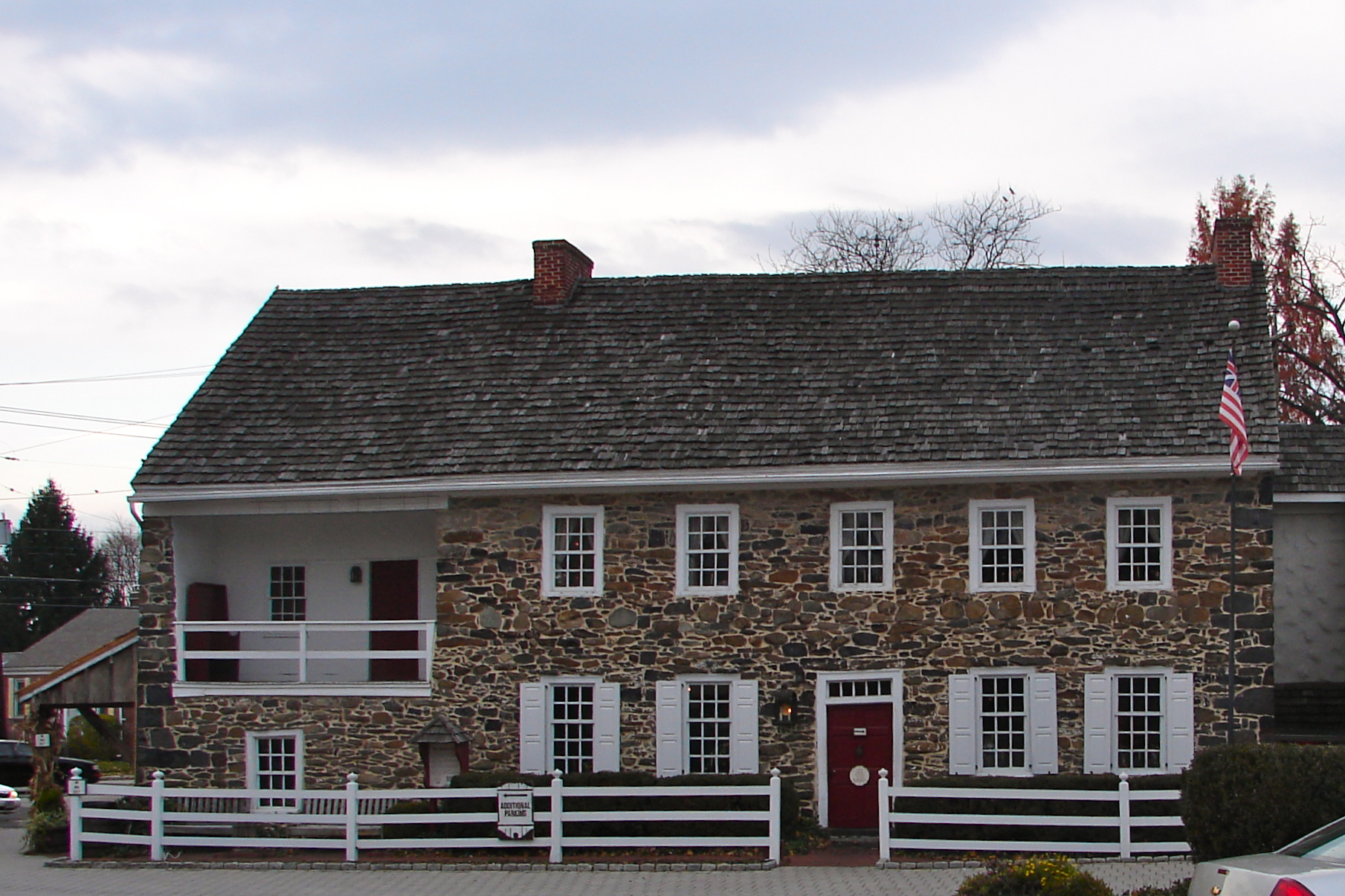
- Dobbin House Tavern, November 2010

- Location within Pennsylvania Location within the United States
- Location: 89 Steinwehr Ave., Gettysburg, Pennsylvania
- Coordinates: 39°49′20″N 77°13′59″W
- Area: 0.3 acres (0.12 ha)
- Built: 1776
- NRHP reference No.: 73001584

Significant dates
- Added to NRHP: March 26, 1973
- Designated PHMC: December 12, 1947

The Dobbin House Tavern, known also as Dobbin House, on 89 Steinwehr Avenue in Gettysburg, Pennsylvania is a tavern which is listed on the National Register of Historic Places.

It was established in 1776, making it the oldest standing structure in the town limits of Gettysburg. It was built to be a home for Reverend Alexander Dobbin and his family. The building may have been a first stop on the Underground Railroad north of the Mason–Dixon line, although this has not been substantiated. During and after the Battle of Gettysburg, the house served as a temporary field hospital.

During the latter half of the 20th century, the Dobbin House was home to a large Civil War diorama and a gift center catering to battlefield tourists. It was listed on the National Register of Historic Places in 1973.

Today, the house is a popular tavern and restaurant.
