= Pennsylvania Hall (Gettysburg, Pennsylvania) =

- Pennsylvania Hall, Gettysburg College
- U.S. National Register of Historic Places
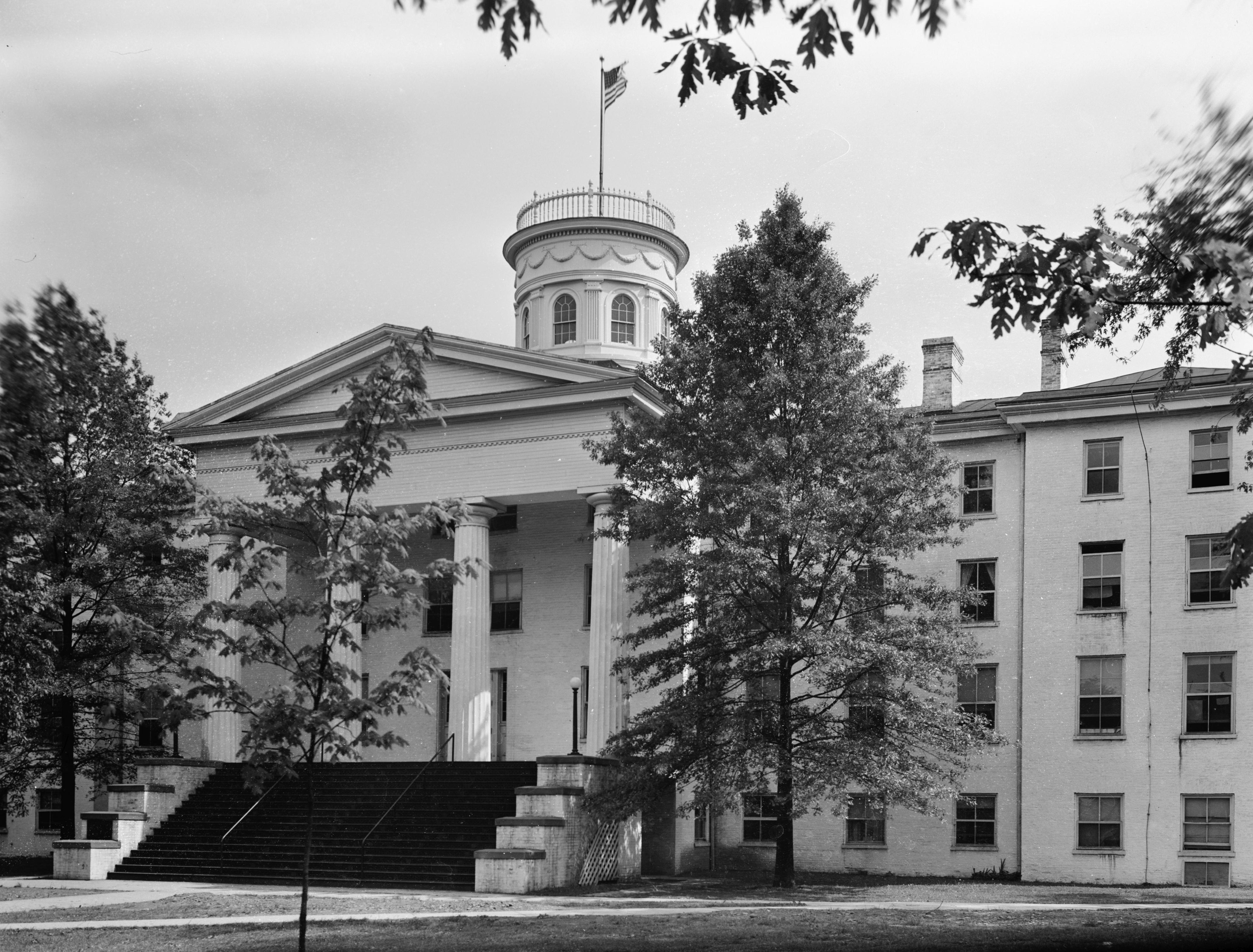
- Front of Pennsylvania Hall

- Location within Pennsylvania Location within the United States
- Location: Gettysburg College campus, Gettysburg, Pennsylvania
- Coordinates: 39°50′6″N 77°14′5″W
- Area: 1 acre (0.40 ha)
- Built: 1837
- Architectural style: Greek Revival
- NRHP reference No.: 72001087
- Added to NRHP: March 16, 1972

Pennsylvania Hall (Penn Hall, Old Dorm) is the Gettysburg College central administrative building and the college's oldest building. Designed in 1835 by John Cresson Trautwine, it was built in 1838 as a "temple-style edifice with four columns in the portico".

During the Battle of Gettysburg in July 1863, Pennsylvania Hall was used as a hospital for wounded troops of the Union and Confederate Armies. The building is also used for the convocation and commencement traditions of entering and departing the college via building.

== History ==
The 1832 "Pennsylvania College of Gettysburg" (now Gettysburg College) initially shared the Gettysburg Academy building on High Street with the Gettysburg Theological Seminary. The college purchased 6 acres (2.4 ha) from Thaddeus Stevens for $528, and the hall with four stories and 150 by 45 feet (46 m × 14 m) was built with a portico on the south side and a 24 by 17 feet (7.3 m × 5.2 m) . The hall was the only academic building until the 1847 Linnæan Hall was dedicated as a museum of Natural History (later becoming the chemistry lab then the 2nd academic gymnasium).

In the early years of its existence, Pennsylvania Hall contained the students' living quarters, as well as several offices and recitation rooms. At the time of the battle of Gettysburg, the building was the largest building in town. The interior of the hall was renovated in 1869-70.

=== Battle of Gettysburg ===
During the American Civil War, Union signal officers used the Old Dorm cupola on June 30, 1863. On July 1, Michael Jacobs, the chemistry and mathematics professor at the college led Union officers to the cupola to observe the battlefield.

Battle casualties were treated in Pennsylvania Hall through about July 29 and totaled nearly 700—many of whom died in the building and on surrounding property.

Soldiers of both armies were treated in Pennsylvania Hall, as control of the College shifted from Union to Confederate forces on the evening of July 1.

Nearby burials of Union soldiers were reinterred in the Gettysburg National Cemetery in the autumn and winter, and Confederate burials were reinterred in the southern cemeteries, primarily in Hollywood Cemetery (Richmond, Virginia).

Pennsylvania College resumed classes on September 24, 1863. Bullets, bones, human remains and bloody books were found in and around the building for many years after the end of the battle.

=== Post-war ===
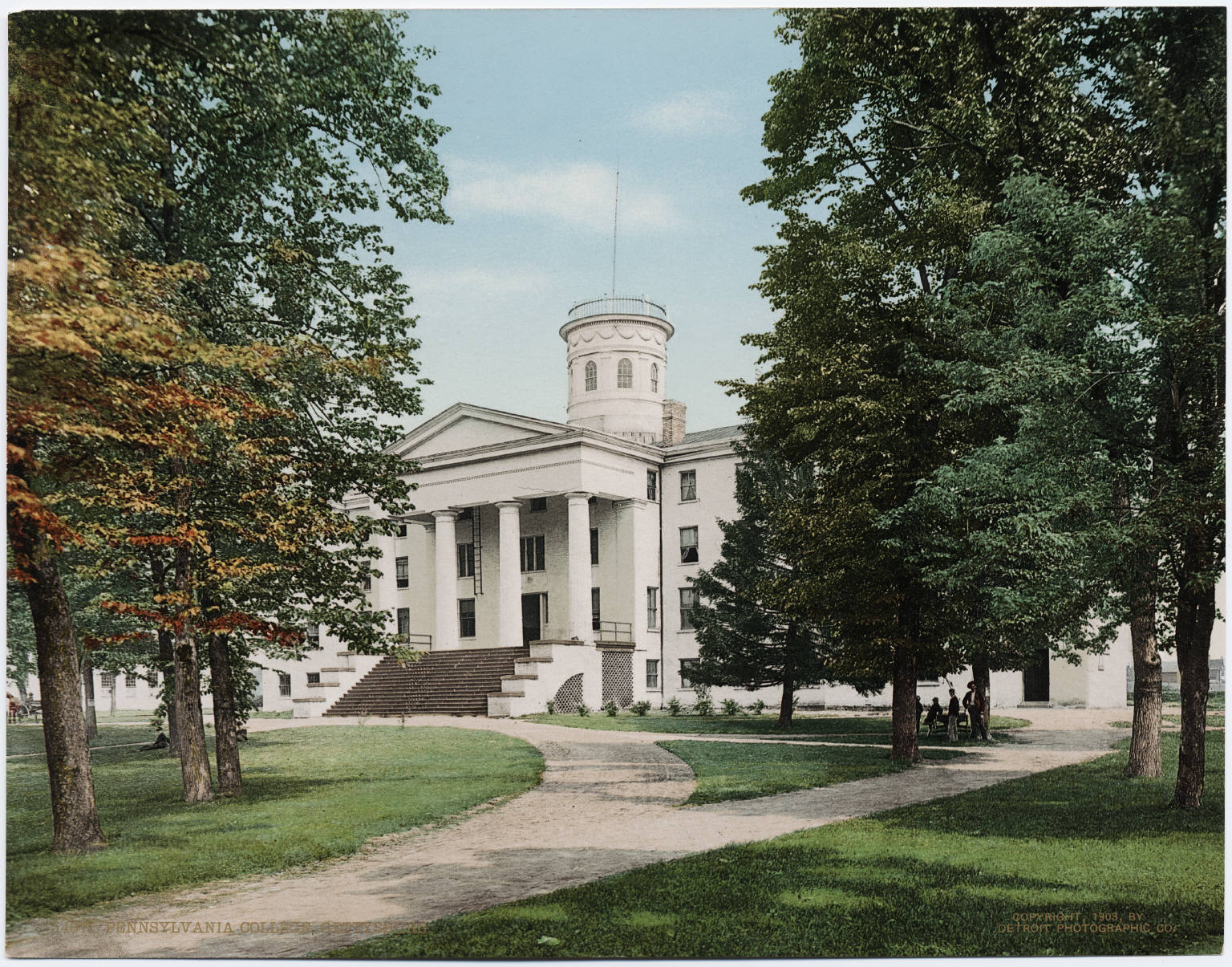
Pennsylvania Hall in 1903

The Pennsylvania Hall interior was again renovated in 1889 and in 1928, and a United States tablet was erected in Old Dorm in 1932 (the "white-painted Gettysburg College building" was the "base hospital" for the 1938 Gettysburg reunion.) A structural renovation of Pennsylvania Hall began January, 1969, to maintain the stability of the exterior walls, roof, and cupola with steel columns, girders and 5 concrete reinforced slabs (1 for each floor, including the attic). During the renovation, numerous artifacts of historical significance were recovered from behind walls and under floors.

Pennsylvania Hall was listed on the National Register of Historic Places in 1972.

== Current use ==
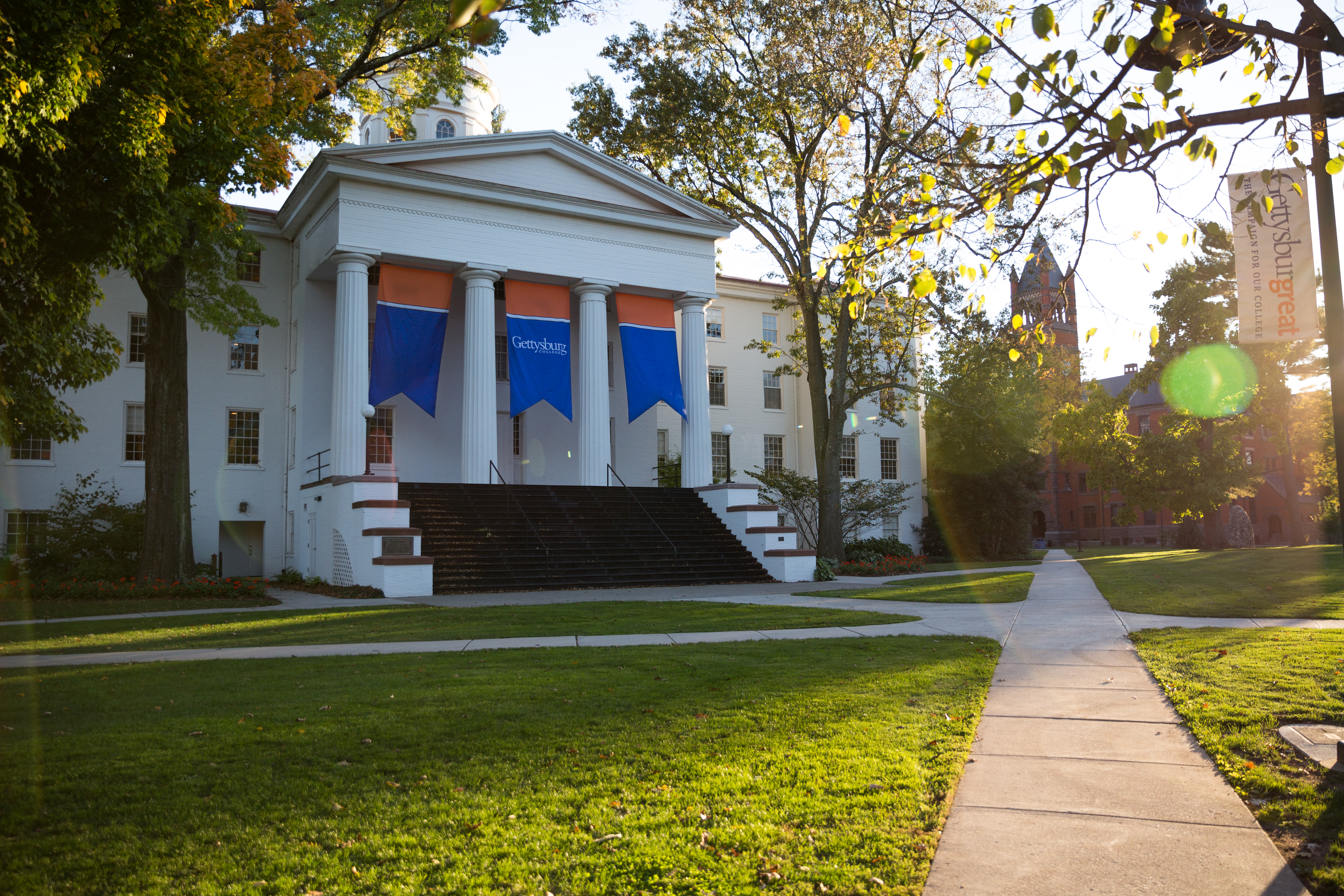
Pennsylvania Hall in the spring

Today, Pennsylvania Hall contains the main administrative offices of Gettysburg College. The offices of the college's president and provost are located in the building, as well as the human resources and financial services departments.
