= Marsh Creek (Monocacy River tributary) =

River in Maryland in Pennsylvania

Coordinates: 39°43′6″N 77°13′38″W

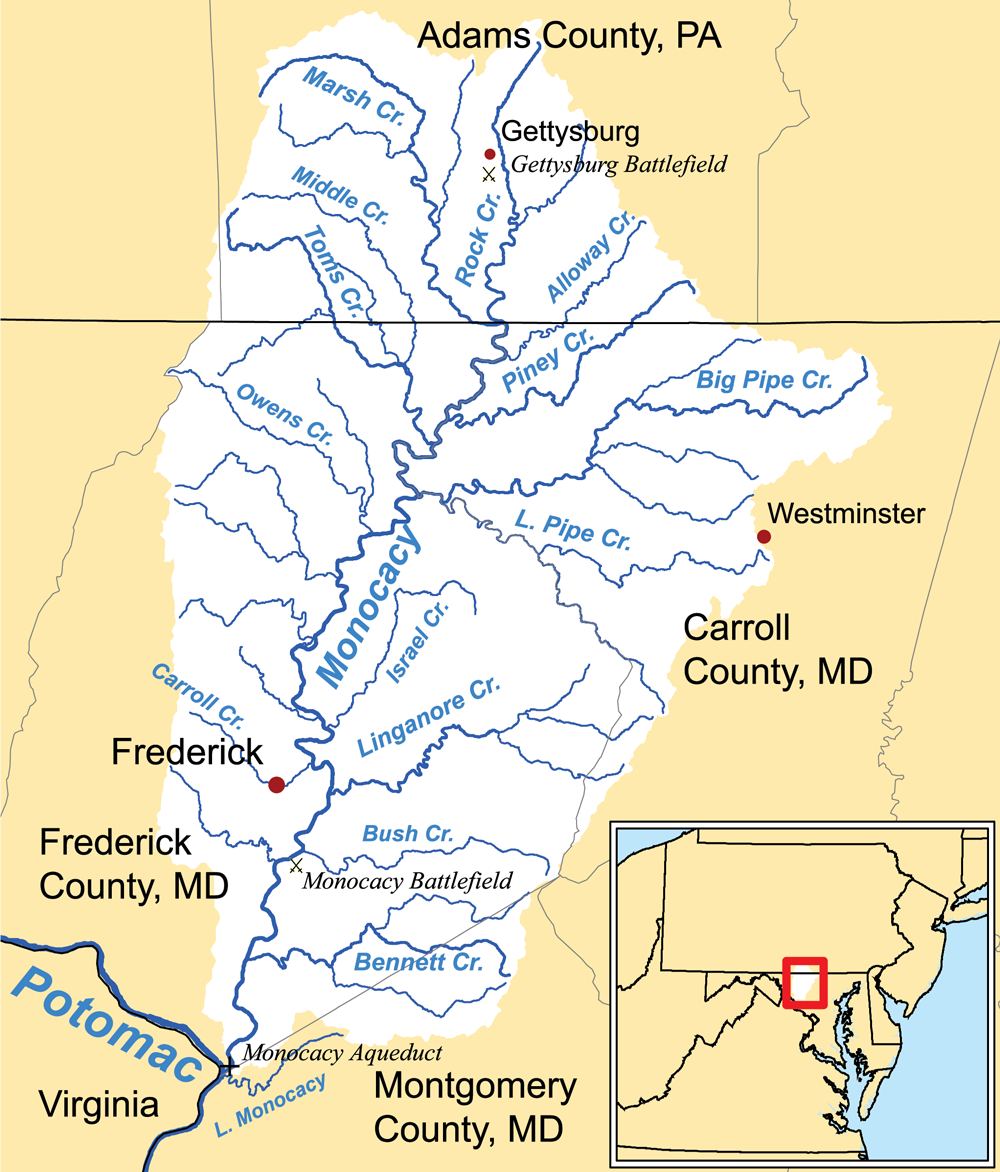
Watershed map showing Marsh Creek

Marsh Creek is a 26.6-mile-long (42.8 km) tributary of the Monocacy River in south-central Pennsylvania and north-central Maryland in the United States.

Marsh Creek and Rock Creek join below Gettysburg and the Gettysburg Battlefield to form the Monocacy River. The height of land between Marsh and Rock creeks is the site of the Battle of Gettysburg.

== See also ==
- List of rivers of Maryland
- List of rivers of Pennsylvania
