= Cumberland Township, Adams County, Pennsylvania =

Township in Pennsylvania, US

Coordinates: 39°44′00″N 77°15′29″W

- Township
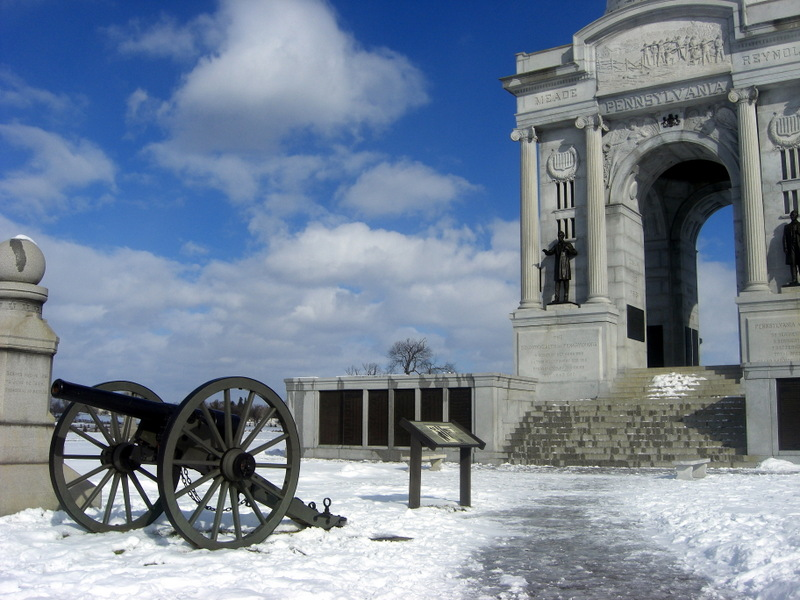
- Gettysburg National Military Park

- Seal

- Location in Adams County and the state of Pennsylvania.
- Country: United States
- State: Pennsylvania
- County: Adams
- Settled: 1733
- Incorporated: Before 1800

Area
  - Total: 33.61 sq mi (87.04 km^{2})
  - Land: 33.43 sq mi (86.58 km^{2})
  - Water: 0.18 sq mi (0.46 km^{2})

Population (2020)
  - Total: 7,031
  - Estimate (2023): 7,138
  - Density: 186.0/sq mi (71.83/km^{2})
- Time zone: UTC-5 (Eastern (EST))
  - Summer (DST): UTC-4 (EDT)
- Area code: 717
- FIPS code: 42-001-17640
- Website: www.cumberlandtownship.com

Cumberland Township is a township in Adams County, Pennsylvania, United States. The population was 7,031 at the 2020 census. In 1863, the American Civil War Battle of Gettysburg took place mainly in Cumberland Township, which surrounds the borough of Gettysburg on three sides.

== Geography ==
According to the United States Census Bureau, the township has a total area of 33.6 square miles (87.0 km^{2}), of which 33.4 square miles (86.6 km^{2}) is land and 0.19 square miles (0.5 km^{2}), or 0.53%, is water.

3,785 acres (1,532 ha) of area is held by the Gettysburg National Military Park, making up almost 20% of the municipality's area. Eisenhower National Historic Site is also mainly in the township.

Populated places in the township include an unincorporated community named Greenmount.

== Demographics ==
Historical population
Census	Pop.	Note	%±
2000	6,300		—
2010	6,162		−2.2%
2020	7,031		14.1%
2023 (est.)	7,138		1.5%

As of the census, there were 6,300 people living in the township. The population density was 171.0 inhabitants per square mile (66.0/km^{2}). There were 2,365 housing units at an average density of 70.7 per square mile (27.3/km^{2}). The racial makeup of the township was 93.84% White, 2.54% African American, 0.30% Native American, 1.45% Asian, 0.02% Pacific Islander, 1.05% from other races, and 0.80% from two or more races. Hispanic or Latino of any race were 2.15% of the population.

There were 2,231 households, out of which 27.1% had children under the age of 18 living with them, 59.7% were married couples living together, 8.6% had a female householder with no husband present, and 28.8% were non-families. 24.9% of all households were made up of individuals, and 12.3% had someone living alone who was 65 years of age or older. The average household size was 2.38 and the average family size was 2.83.

In the township the population was spread out, with 20.6% under the age of 18, 6.0% from 18 to 24, 23.6% from 25 to 44, 28.8% from 45 to 64, and 20.9% who were 65 years of age or older. The median age was 45 years. For every 100 females, there were 94.1 males. For every 100 females age 18 and over, there were 92.1 males.

The median income for a household in the township was $48,580, and the median income for a family was $54,890. Males had a median income of $41,250 versus $25,909 for females. The per capita income for the township was $22,782. About 3.7% of families and 5.5% of the population were below the poverty line, including 5.6% of those under age 18 and 2.2% of those age 65 or over.

== Transportation ==
Cumberland Regional Airport is in the township.

== Education ==
The school district is Gettysburg Area School District.

James Gettys Elementary School, which has a Gettysburg postal address, is in Cumberland Township. Northern portions of the township are zoned to Gettys Elementary, while southern portions are zoned to Lincoln Elementary School in Gettysburg borough. The district's comprehensive middle and high schools are Gettysburg Area Middle School and Gettysburg Area High School.

Vida Charter School Charter School is in Cumberland Township. A bilingual school, it began operations in 2009.

Harrisburg Area Community College Gettysburg Campus is in Cumberland Township.

Lutheran Theological Seminary at Gettysburg (of the United Lutheran Seminary) is mostly in Gettysburg borough, but extends into the township.
