= List of people from Dubuque, Iowa =

This is a list of the people born in, residents of, or otherwise closely associated with the city of Dubuque, Iowa, United States, and its surrounding metropolitan area.

== General ==
- Austin Adams, judge, Iowa state supreme court chief justice (1880–87)
- Don Ameche, actor, Loras College, buried in nearby Asbury, Iowa
- Francis Beckman, bishop, an American prelate of the Roman Catholic Church, served as Bishop of Lincoln (1924–30) and as Archbishop of Dubuque (1930–46)
- Alfred S. Bennett, judge, educator, attorney in Oregon, 49th Associate Justice of the Oregon Supreme Court (1919–1920)
- Leo Binz, Archbishop of the Archdiocese of Dubuque
- Richard Pike Bissell, author
- Gottfried Blocklinger, rear admiral in US Navy; in 1879, as a lieutenant, he commanded survey of Madeira river in the Amazon; lieutenant on board USS Baltimore (C-3) during Baltimore Crisis of 1891; executive officer on board USS Charleston (C-2) during the Capture of Guam during Spanish–American War in 1898
- Donald G. Bloesch, theologian
- Charles H. Bradley Jr., businessman
- James Byrne, Archbishop of Dubuque, died in Dubuque
- Robert Byrne, author, billiards player, Hall of Fame instructor of pool and billiards
- LeRoy E. Cain, flight director during the Space Shuttle Columbia disaster
- Sabin Carr, pole vault gold medalist at 1928 Summer Olympics
- John Patrick Carroll, bishop
- Saint Cessianus, whose remains are kept inside the altar at St. Raphael's Cathedral
- Mark Chamberlain, photographic, environmental, and installation artist, curator, educator
- Tom Churchill, TV and radio meteorologist for ABC, NBC, PBS
- Andrew Clemens, sand artist
- Mary Clement, Luxembourgish-American serial killer who poisoned several family members
- Ada Langworthy Collier (1843–1919), poet, writer
- Ira Davenport, 1912 Olympic bronze medalist and Dubuque coach
- Julien Dubuque, explorer, first white settler in Dubuque
- Peter H. Engle, first Speaker of the House of Wisconsin Territory, which at that time included all of what is now Iowa (and Minnesota, and parts of the Dakotas)
- David Farley, author and journalist, writing about travel, food, and culture for the New York Times, Washington Post, Condé Nast Traveler, and World Hum
- Victor Feguer, convicted murderer, last federal inmate executed in the United States before the moratorium on the death penalty following Furman v. Georgia, last person put to death in Iowa
- Margaret Feldner, nun, educator; served as Quincy University's 21st president, assumed the post January 1, 2004; first woman president appointed to the role at Quincy University; excused in 2006
- William Arthur Ganfield, educator, figure in higher education, president of Centre College in Danville, Kentucky, 1915–1921; later president of Carroll College from 1921 until his retirement in 1939; supported athletic programs at both schools
- Thomas Gifford, author, best-selling author of thriller novels
- John Graas, musician, known primarily as one of the first and best French horn players in jazz
- Carl L. Hamilton, named partner in the Booz Allen Hamilton management and information technology consulting firm
- Jerome Hanus, archbishop of the Catholic Church; Bishop of Saint Cloud, Minnesota, 1987–1994; former archbishop of Dubuque
- James H. Hawley, ninth Governor of Idaho; born in Dubuque
- Geoff Herbach, novelist
- Fridolin Heer, architect, he and his son set up practice in Dubuque in 1864; buildings by Fridolin Heer and Son include the Dubuque County Courthouse, 1891–1893
- Gwen Hennessey, activist, religious sister; known for protests at Fort Benning, Georgia, home of the Army's School of the Americas, a facility for training Latin American soldiers
- John Hennessey, bishop of the Diocese of Dubuque 1866–1893, then named the first archbishop of Dubuque
- Jack Hicks, sculptor
- Henry J. Messing (1847–1913), rabbi
- Kelly Ortberg, engineer, current CEO of Boeing
- Doron Jensen, founder of Timber Lodge Steakhouse
- Richard A. Jensen, theologian and Carlson Professor of Homiletics at Lutheran School of Theology at Chicago
- Frederick William Kaltenbach, American who served Nazis as wartime radio broadcaster known as "Lord Hee-Haw"
- Frank Keenan, actor, stage director and manager during silent film era; among first stage actors to star in Hollywood, pursued work in feature films
- Dallas Kinney, photojournalist who won the 1970 Pulitzer Prize in photography for his pictures of Florida migrant workers
- Kevin Kunnert, NBA Basketball Player, First Team All American at the University of Iowa
- Kay Kurt, New Realist painter known for her large-scale candy paintings
- Anna B. Lawther, leader in the women's suffrage movement
- Mathias Clement Lenihan, 20th-century archbishop in the Catholic Church; bishop of the Diocese of Great Falls, Montana 1904–30
- Alexander Levi, French Jew of Sephardic origin; first foreigner to be naturalized in Iowa; a grocer, miner, mine provisioner and department store owner; founded the first two Jewish congregations in the city
- Margaret Lindsay, actress, noted for her supporting work in successful films of the 1930s and 1940s such as Jezebel (1938) and Scarlet Street (1945) and for leading roles in lower-budgeted B-movies such as the Ellery Queen series at Columbia in the early 1940s
- Bill Lipinski, politician; attended Loras College; U.S. Representative for Illinois' 3rd and 5th districts (1983–2005)
- Francis MacNutt, religious author; a leading member of the Catholic Charismatic Renewal
- Dennis Mahony, journalist, a founder of the Telegraph Herald
- ShaChelle Devlin Manning, businesswoman, change agent for nanotechnology, attempting to pave the way for nanotechnology's commercialization at the university, company, state, federal, and international level
- Robert Martin, original Tuskegee Airmen and war hero who flew in World War II
- Michael Joseph Melloy, judge of the Court of Appeals for the Eighth Circuit
- Kate Mulgrew, actress, Star Trek: Voyager, Mrs. Columbo and Orange is the New Black
- Thomas C. Power, 19th-century senator of Montana
- Louie Psihoyos, documentary film director; in 2009 he directed and appeared in the feature-length documentary The Cove, which won an Oscar for Best Documentary Feature
- David Rabe, playwright; won the Tony Award for Best Play in 1972 (Sticks and Bones); received Tony award nominations for Best Play in 1974 (In the Boom Boom Room), 1977 (Streamers) and 1985 (Hurlyburly)
- John F. Rague (1799–1877), architect who designed and built the 1837 Old Capitol of Illinois and the 1840 Territorial Capitol of Iowa, the Dubuque city hall, central market house, and jail
- Anna M. Morrison Reed, poet, lecturer, suffragist, editor/publisher of a newspaper and a magazine
- Robert Reuland, novelist
- Raymond Roseliep, poet and haiku writer, Loras College
- Alexander Rummler, painter
- Albert Sale, soldier in the U.S. Army who served with 8th U.S. Cavalry in the Arizona Territory during the Apache Wars; was awarded the Medal of Honor for gallantry against a hostile band of Apache Indians
- Debra Saylor, pianist and singer
- John P. Schlegel, educator, 23rd President of Creighton University, 26th President of the University of San Francisco (1991–2000)
- Dennis Schmitz, contemporary poet
- William A. Shanklin, educator, president of Upper Iowa University in 1905–09 and thereafter president of Wesleyan University
- George Shiras Jr., Associate Justice of the Supreme Court of the United States; practiced law in Dubuque 1855–1858
- Oliver Perry Shiras, first federal judge on the United States District Court for the Northern District of Iowa
- Hilda Siller (1861-1945), poet and short story writer
- J. R. Simplot, entrepreneur and formerly world's oldest billionaire
- Laurel Sprengelmeyer, musician better known as Little Scream
- Mark Steines, TV anchor and reporter on Entertainment Tonight
- James Huff Stout, Wisconsin politician and businessman, founded Stout Manual Institute (now University of Wisconsin-Stout)
- Jessie Taft, early authority on child placement and therapeutic adoption; best remembered for her work as the translator and biographer of Otto Rank, an outcast disciple of Sigmund Freud
- John Tomkins, criminal, arrested and charged with sending several threatening letters and bomb-like devices to financial firms in the Midwestern United States under the pseudonym The Bishop
- William Vandever, U.S. Representative for Iowa's 2nd district (1859–61) and California's 6th district (1887–91)
- James F. Watson, 25th Associate Justice of the Oregon Supreme Court, 1876–1878; previously in state legislature and later served as United States Attorney for the District of Oregon
- Loras Joseph Watters, Roman Catholic bishop
- Westel W. Willoughby, educator

== Politicians ==
- John T. Adams, businessman; former chairman of the Republican National Committee (1921–24)
- William B. Allison, U.S. Senator, representative from Iowa
- Mike Blouin, United States Representative representing Iowa's 2nd district (1975–79)
- David Bly, Minnesota House of Representatives (2007–11)
- Rod Blum, U.S. representative
- William W. Chapman, politician and lawyer in Oregon and Iowa; served as a United States Attorney in Iowa when it was part of the Michigan and Wisconsin territories; represented the Iowa Territory in the United States House of Representatives (1838–40); later immigrated to the Oregon Country, where he served in the Oregon Territorial Legislature (1848–49)
- Lincoln Clark, US Representative from Iowa (1851–53)
- Maurice Connolly, elected in 1912 to a single term as a Democratic member of the U.S. House of Representatives from Iowa's 3rd congressional district; gave up his House seat in an unsuccessful bid for election to the U.S. Senate in 1914; then served as an aviation officer in World War I and died in a plane crash in 1921
- Mike Connolly, Iowa state senator (1990–2008)
- Clarence A. Darrow, Illinois state legislator and lawyer
- Timothy Davis, United States Representative from Iowa (1857–59); only Iowa Representative born before 1800; first Republican representative from Iowa
- Carl DeMaio, San Diego city councilman (2008–2012)
- Thomas O. Edwards; elected as a Whig from Ohio to the Thirtieth Congress (March 4, 1847 – March 3, 1849); attended former President John Quincy Adams, who was then a Congressman, when he suffered a fatal stroke in the Hall of the House of Representatives; inspector of marine hospitals; during the Civil War served as surgeon in the Third Regiment, Iowa Volunteer Infantry
- James H. Hawley, ninth Governor of Idaho, 1911–1913; mayor of Boise, 1903–1905
- David B. Henderson, speaker of the U.S. House of Representatives
- Pam Jochum, member of both the Iowa state house and senate
- George Wallace Jones, one of the first two United States Senators to represent the state of Iowa after it was admitted to the Union in 1846
- Barbara Larkin, U.S. Assistant Secretary of State for Legislative Affairs, 1996–2001
- John Hooker Leavitt, early banker and Iowa state senator
- Algernon Lee, Socialist Party of America leader
- Shannon Lundgren, member of the Iowa House of Representatives
- Thomas McKnight, businessman, member of Wisconsin Territorial Council
- James Henry Mays, politician; insurance agent in Dubuque in the 1890s; United States representative from Utah (1915–21)
- Thomas John Miller, politician and lawyer; 31st and 33rd Attorney General of the state of Iowa (1979–91; 1995–present)
- Dan Mozena, U.S. Foreign Service Officer; member of the Senior Foreign Service; United States Ambassador to Angola, 2007–2010; on May 16, 2011, President Obama nominated Mozena to be the next U.S. Ambassador to Bangladesh
- Pat Murphy, politician, Iowa state representative (1989–2015)
- Richard L. Murphy, senator from Iowa (1933–36); Louis Murphy Park is named after him
- Mike Obermueller, former member of Minnesota House of Representatives (2009–11)
- Francis W. Palmer, nineteenth-century politician, publisher, printer, editor and proprietor; editor of Dubuque Times, 1858–61; Public Printer of the United States, 1889–94
- Thomas C. Power, Senator from Montana (1890–95)
- John F. Rague (1799–1877), architect who designed and built the 1837 Old Capitol of Illinois and the 1840 Territorial Capitol of Iowa, the city hall, central market house, and jail
- John R. Reilly, political adviser; joined John F. Kennedy's 1960 presidential campaign and was hired as an aide by Attorney General of the United States Robert F. Kennedy; served as a campaign aide to the presidential campaigns of all three of the Kennedys; for John in 1960, Robert in 1968 and Edward in 1980; campaign aide to Edmund S. Muskie in 1972, Walter Mondale in 1984 and Joseph Biden in 1988
- Tom Tauke, United States Representative
- Sara Taylor, Deputy Assistant to the President and Director of Political Affairs in the administration of George W. Bush
- Travis Tranel, Wisconsin state assemblyman (2010–present)
- William Tripp, served in the Maine House of Representatives in 1841 and the Maine Senate in 1848–9, becoming Senate President in 1849; opened a law practice in Dubuque, 1852–57; after the war he was appointed Surveyor General for the Dakota Territory under President Andrew Johnson
- Suzanne VanOrman, Member of Oregon House of Representatives (2009–2011)
- Mike Vondran, member of the Iowa House of Representatives (2023–present)
- Martin Joseph Wade, US Representative from Iowa (1903–05)
- Frank M. Ziebach, noted political figure in the Dakota Territory during the territorial period, 1861–1889; pioneer newspaperman, founding a number of newspapers in the Iowa and Dakota Territories, including the Yankton Weekly Dakotan in 1861; Ziebach County, South Dakota is named for him
- Ted Eischeid, member-elect for the 22nd district of the Alaska House of Representatives

== Notable athletes/coaches ==
- Eddie Anderson, head football coach at Columbia College in Dubuque (1922–1924), DePaul University (1925–1931), the College of the Holy Cross (1933–1938, 1950–1964), and the University of Iowa (1939–1942, 1946–1949); played professional football in the NFL for the Rochester Jeffersons in 1922 and the Chicago Cardinals 1922–1925; inducted into the College Football Hall of Fame as a coach in 1971
- Johnny Armstrong, football player and coach; played on the Rock Island Independents of the National Football League, and later the first American Football League, 1923–1926; in 1924, he coached the Independents to a 5–2–2 record, and a fifth-place finish
- Kayla Banwarth, former libero for Team USA women's volleyball team and Nebraska; current head women's volleyball coach at Ole Miss
- Charlie Buelow, outfielder; Major League Baseball infielder for the New York Giants in 1901
- Jay Berwanger, first Heisman Trophy winner (1935, University of Chicago); first pick in 1936 NFL Draft by the Philadelphia Eagles
- Aaron Brant, NFL offensive lineman
- Charlie Buelow, outfielder; Major League Baseball infielder for the New York Giants in 1901
- Sabin Carr, athlete; won gold medal in the pole vault in the 1928 Amsterdam Olympics
- John Chalmers, head football coach at Franklin & Marshall College (1902), University of Iowa (1903–1905), Columbia College in Dubuque, Iowa, now known as Loras College (1907–1914), and University of Dubuque (1914–1924); head men's basketball coach at Iowa for one season (1904–1905); baseball coach at Iowa for two seasons (1904–1905) and at Columbia College (1915–1921)
- Ira Davenport, head football coach at Columbia College, 1920–1921; general manager and treasurer of the Dubuque Boat and Boiler Works; competed in the 1912 Summer Olympics held in Stockholm, Sweden in the 800 metres where he won the bronze medal
- Gary Dolphin, radio play-by-play broadcaster for the University of Iowa Hawkeyes football and men's basketball teams for Learfield Sports and the Iowa Hawkeye Sports Network
- Gus Dorais, head football coach at Columbia College (1914–1917), Gonzaga University (1920–1924), and the University of Detroit (1925–1942); head coach of the NFL's Detroit Lions (1943–1947); head basketball coach at Notre Dame, Detroit Mercy, and Gonzaga; head baseball coach at Notre Dame and Gonzaga; inducted into the College Football Hall of Fame as a coach in 1954
- Fred Glade, starting pitcher; played for the Chicago Orphans (1902), St. Louis Browns (1904–1907) and New York Highlanders (1908)
- Fred Gloden, NFL player
- Sigmund Harris, football player; University of Minnesota's All-American quarterback, 1902–04
- Dick Hoerner, NFL fullback; fullback for the University of Iowa in 1942 and 1946 and for the Los Angeles Rams 1947–1951; concluded his professional football career as a member of the Dallas Texans in 1952
- Joe Hoerner, relief pitcher; played for the Houston Colt .45s (1963–1964), St. Louis Cardinals (1966–1969), Philadelphia Phillies (1970–72, 1975), Atlanta Braves (1972–1973), Kansas City Royals (1973–1974), Texas Rangers (1976), and Cincinnati Reds (1977)
- Frederick M. Irish, first head football coach at the Territorial Normal School, 1896–1906; first athletic director at Territorial/Tempe Normal, 1896–1913; also taught science at the school
- Max Kadesky, All-American college football player for the University of Iowa; later played one season in the NFL with the Rock Island Independents
- Ed Keas, Major League Baseball pitcher for the 1888 Cleveland Blues of the American Association
- Keith Krepfle, NFL tight end; played for the Philadelphia Eagles (1975–81) and the Atlanta Falcons (1982)
- Walton Kirk Jr., 1945 consensus All American in basketball, University of Illinois; played five years in the NBA for Tri-City Blackhawks, Ft. Wayne Zollner Pistons and Milwaukee Hawks; Dubuque Senior and Dubuque Hempstead basketball coach, 1960–1973
- Dan Koppen, offensive lineman for the New England Patriots
- Kevin Kunnert, basketball player; played for the Chicago Bulls, Houston Rockets, Los Angeles Clippers, and Portland Trail Blazers, 1973–82
- Elmer Layden, one of the Four Horsemen of Notre Dame; later commissioner of the NFL; coached at Loras College in the 1920s
- Tom Loftus, baseball player and manager
- Ace Loomis, NFL player for the Green Bay Packers
- Pete McMahon, NFL offensive lineman
- Bill McWilliams, baseball player for the Boston Red Sox (1931)
- Karl Noonan, NFL wide receiver; played for Miami Dolphins (1966–72); an AFL All-Star in 1968
- Johnny Orr, basketball coach at Iowa State University and the University of Michigan; coached at Dubuque Senior High in the 1950s; remains the winningest coach in Iowa State history, with 218 wins and 200 losses
- Oran Pape, NFL football player; law enforcement officer; only member of the Iowa State Patrol murdered in the line of duty
- Tucker Poolman, professional ice hockey player for the Vancouver Canucks
- David Reed, football player; wide receiver for the Baltimore Ravens of the NFL
- Kevin Rhomberg, baseball player, Cleveland Indians (1982–84); head baseball coach for Cleveland State University (1992–96)
- John R. Richards, head coach at Colorado College (1905–1909), the University of Wisconsin–Madison (1911, 1917, 1919–1922), and Ohio State University (1912)
- Bill Roberts, NFL running back for the Green Bay Packers (1956)
- Tom Ryder, 19th-century professional baseball outfielder
- Bob Stull, college athletics administrator; former football player and coach
- Don Vosberg, NFL player for the New York Giants
- Len Watters, coach
- Landon Wilson, NHL player for the Colorado Avalanche, Boston Bruins, Phoenix Coyotes and Dallas Stars
