= Richard A. Jensen =

American Lutheran theologian (1934–2014)

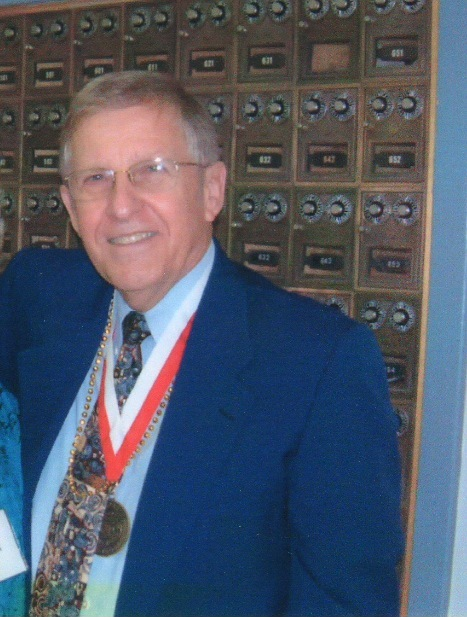
- Jensen at Dana College in 2003
- Born: Richard Alvin Jensen; July 4, 1934; Fremont, Nebraska, US
- Died: November 19, 2014 (aged 80); Lakeville, Minnesota, US
- Spouse: Bonnie L. Jensen (m. 1957)
- Children: Doron; Dodi; Derek

Academic background
- Education: Dana College; Wartburg Theological Seminary; Chicago Theological Seminary; Aquinas Institute of Theology
- Academic advisors: Robert J. Marshall; Gerhard von Rad
- Influences: Søren Kierkegaard; Gerhard von Rad

Academic work
- Discipline: Theology
- Sub-discipline: Homiletics; systematic theology
- School or tradition: Charismaticism; Lutheranism
- Institutions: Mekana Yesus Seminary; Lutheran School of Theology at Chicago; Wartburg Theological Seminary; Luther Seminary

Richard Alvin Jensen (July 4, 1934 – November 19, 2014) was an American Mainline Protestant theologian who served as the Carlson Professor of Homiletics Emeritus at the Lutheran School of Theology at Chicago.

== Early life and education ==
Jensen was born on July 4, 1934, in Fremont, Nebraska, where he attended Fremont Senior High School. He earned his Bachelor of Arts degree cum laude in philosophy from Dana College in 1956. Jensen attended college with future US Senator from Illinois Paul Simon and was lifelong friends with Simon. Jensen later earned his Bachelor of Divinity degree from Wartburg Theological Seminary in 1959 and his Master of Sacred Theology degree from Chicago Theological Seminary in 1962. Jensen began doctoral work at Princeton Theological Seminary under Gerhard von Rad, but departed before completion to take a professorship in Addis Ababa, Ethiopia. Jensen later completed his Doctor of Philosophy degree from Aquinas Institute of Theology in 1972.

== Academic career ==
Jensen studied in Chicago and wrote his master's thesis, The Covenant in The Deuteronomic and Priestly Traditions, under Robert J. Marshall. Jensen left Chicago in 1960 to study under Gerhard von Rad and Otto Piper at Princeton Theological Seminary. Jensen left his doctorate program after a year to become a professor and co-found the Mekana Yesus Seminary in Addis Ababa, Ethiopia, in 1962. Jensen returned to the United States in 1965 to teach at his alma mater Dana College. He returned to Wartburg Theological Seminary to teach from 1972 to 1981. He briefly taught at Luther Seminary before leaving academia in 1982 to host the television and radio program, Lutheran Vespers. In 1997, Jensen was invited to become the first Axel Jacob and Gerde Maria Carlson Professor of Homiletics at Lutheran School of Theology at Chicago, a post he held until his retirement in 2002. Richard A. Jensen was also the Dean of the Doctorate of Ministry program sponsored by the Association of Chicago Theological Seminaries in the late 1980s. In 1986, Jensen along with his wife Bonnie, assisted with merging the American Lutheran Church and Lutheran Church in America into the Evangelical Lutheran Church in America.

=== Contributions to theology ===
In the late 1960s the charismatic movement was causing a controversy in the Lutheran church. Jensen had become a leading scholar on the application of a Lutheran theological understanding of neo-Pentecostalism. Jensen wrote his first book in 1974, Touched by the Spirit, developing a Lutheran perspective on his personal experiences, and attempting to embrace the charismatic movement rather than condemn it. Jensen's research was met some skepticism, but ultimately received positive reception from parish pastors, theologians, and college professors.

Although, Jensen's doctorate was in systematic theology, he developed a story-based preaching technique that emphasized preaching as an oral art of communication rather than written discourse memorized or read to listeners. In 1993, Jensen published Thinking in Story. This was followed by three books that understood the gospels of Matthew, Mark, and Luke as oral narratives from which the preacher used biblical narrative to enable the listener to participate more holistically in the stories of Jesus. Jensen further expanded his understanding of preaching to incorporate the use of art and visual images in the sermon and worship experience. This thinking culminated in the book published in 2005, Envisioning the Word: The Use of Visual Images in Preaching.

== Personal life ==
Richard Jensen was married to Bonnie L. Jensen, ELCA Global Mission executive director (retired), they had three children: Doron, Dodi, and Derek. Jensen was also a relative of Moritz Thomsen. A scholar of ancient texts, he could read and write in Hebrew, Greek, and Latin. On November 19, 2014, he died at the age of 80.

While in Ethiopia, Jensen and his wife served with fellow Lutheran missionaries Irvin and Jerene Mortenson family, parents of Greg Mortenson. While in Ethiopia they became friends with Luther Youngdahl and the Youngdahl family.

Richard Jensen along with his wife Bonnie, received honorary doctorates from Dana College.

== Selected works ==
- Touched by the Spirit: One Man's Struggle to Understand His Experience of the Holy Spirit. Augsburg Publishing House. 1975. ISBN 978-0-8066-1484-7.
- Telling the Story: Variety and Imagination in Preaching. Augsburg Publishing House. 1980. ISBN 978-0-8066-1766-4.
- The Crucified Ruler: Sermons for Lent and Easter. Lima, Ohio: CSS Publishing Co. 1987. ISBN 978-0-89536-870-6.
- What Is God's Plan for My Life? Ten Questions Christians Most Often Ask. Augsburg Fortress Publishing. 1988. ISBN 978-0-8066-2365-8.
- Thinking in Story: Preaching in a Post-Literate Age. Lima, Ohio: CSS Publishing Co. 1993. ISBN 978-1-55673-573-8.
- Preaching Mark's Gospel: A Narrative Approach. Lima, Ohio: CSS Publishing Co. 1996. ISBN 978-0-7880-0833-7.
- Preaching Luke's Gospel: A Narrative Approach. Lima, Ohio: CSS Publishing Co. 1997. ISBN 978-0-7880-1110-8.
- Preaching Matthew's Gospel: A Narrative Approach. Lima, Ohio: CSS Publishing Co. 1998. ISBN 978-0-7880-1221-1.
- Envisioning the Word: The Use of Visual Images in Preaching. Minneapolis, Minnesota: Fortress Press. 2005. ISBN 978-1-4514-1673-2.
