= Chuck Bradley =

Chuck Bradley may refer to:

- Chuck Bradley (tight end) (1950–2022), American football player
- Chuck Bradley (offensive tackle) (born 1970), American football player

== See also ==
- Charles Bradley (disambiguation)
