= Franklin Fry =

Franklin Fry may refer to:

- Franklin Clark Fry (1900–1968), American Lutheran clergyman
- Franklin Foster Fry (1864–1933), Lutheran minister
