= Charles Bradley =

Charles or Charlie Bradley may refer to:

== Sports ==
- Charles Bradley (basketball) (born 1959), retired American basketball player
- Charlie Bradley (basketball) (born 1963), American basketball player
- Charles Bradley (footballer) (1922–1984), English professional footballer
- Charles Bradley (bowls) (born 1919), Rhodesian lawn bowler
- Chuck Bradley (tight end) (Charles John Bradley, 1950–2022), American football player
- Chuck Bradley (offensive tackle) (Charles Warren Bradley II, born 1970), American football player

== Others ==
- Charles Bradley (medical doctor) (1902–1979), American physician who did early research on using stimulants for behavioural disorders
- Charles Bradley (preacher) (1789–1871), preacher and sermon writer
- Charles Bradley (sailor) (c. 1838–?), Irish sailor who fought in the American Civil War
- Charles Bradley (singer) (1948–2017), American singer
- Charles C. Bradley (1911–2002), American professor of geology
- Charles H. Bradley Jr. (1899–1972), American businessman
- Charles S. Bradley (1819–1888), American judge
