= Bonnie L. Jensen =

American missionary and academic (1938–2024)

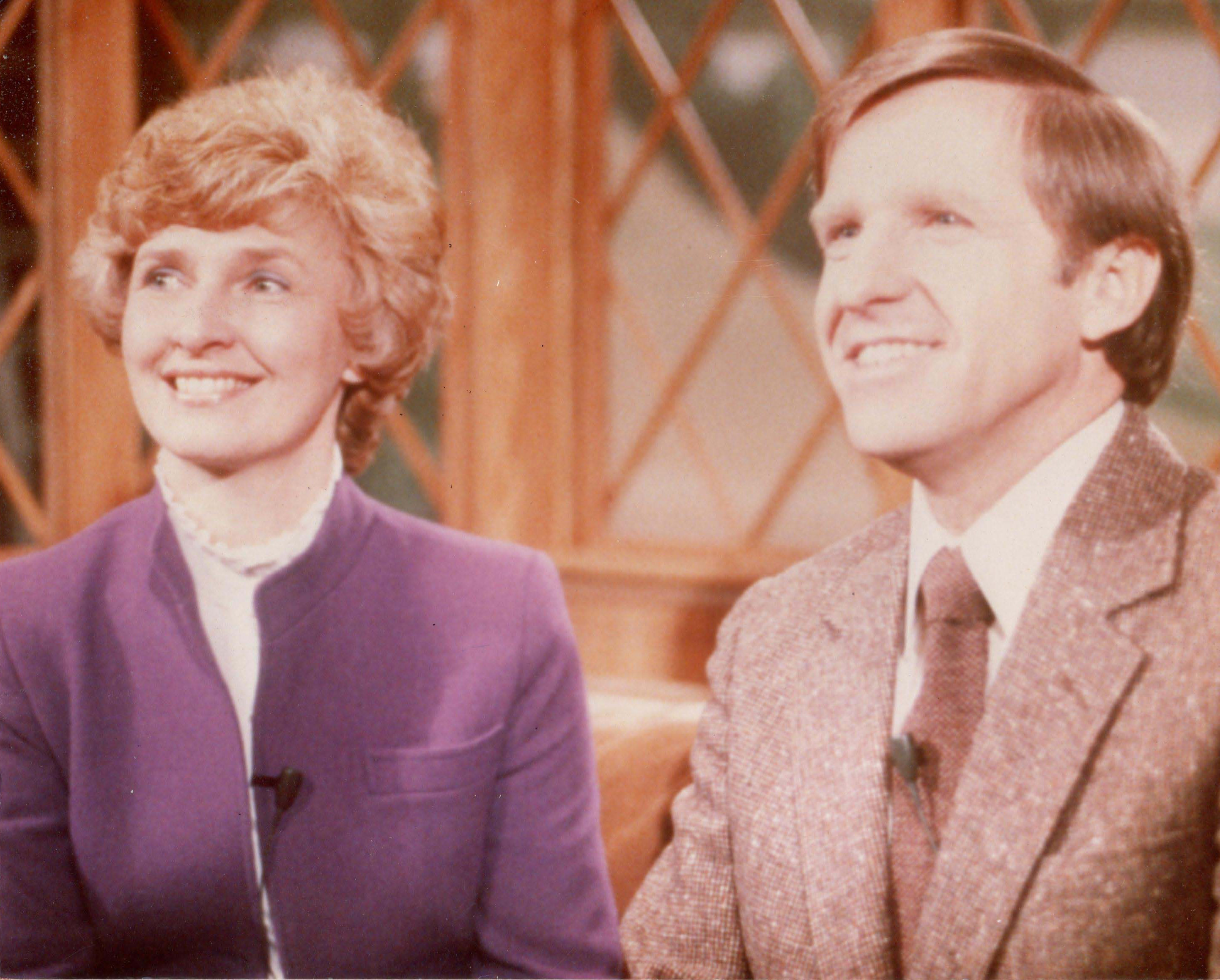
- Bonnie with her husband on the set of Lutheran Vespers.
- Born: Bonnie Lou Hagedorn; October 11, 1938; Royal, Iowa, U.S.
- Died: March 31, 2024 (aged 85); Eagan, Minnesota, U.S.
- Resting place: Riverside Cemetery in Spencer, Iowa
- Education: Dana College B.A. DD.Min. (Hon); Wartburg Theological Seminary, M.Div. D.Div. (Hon)
- Occupations: Minister; ELCA Global Mission, Director
- Spouse: Richard A. Jensen
- Children: 3
- Theological work
- Tradition or movement: Evangelical Lutheran Church in America

Bonnie Lou Jensen (October 11, 1938 -- March 31, 2024) was an American Mainline Protestant missionary, international relations specialist, and director of the ELCA Global Mission.

== Early life and education ==
Bonnie Lou Hagedorn was born in Royal, Iowa, and received degrees from Dana College and Wartburg Theological Seminary. She married American theologian Richard A. Jensen in 1957. Jensen moved to Addis Ababa, Ethiopia, to assist with the founding of the Mekane Yesus Seminary in 1962.

== Career ==
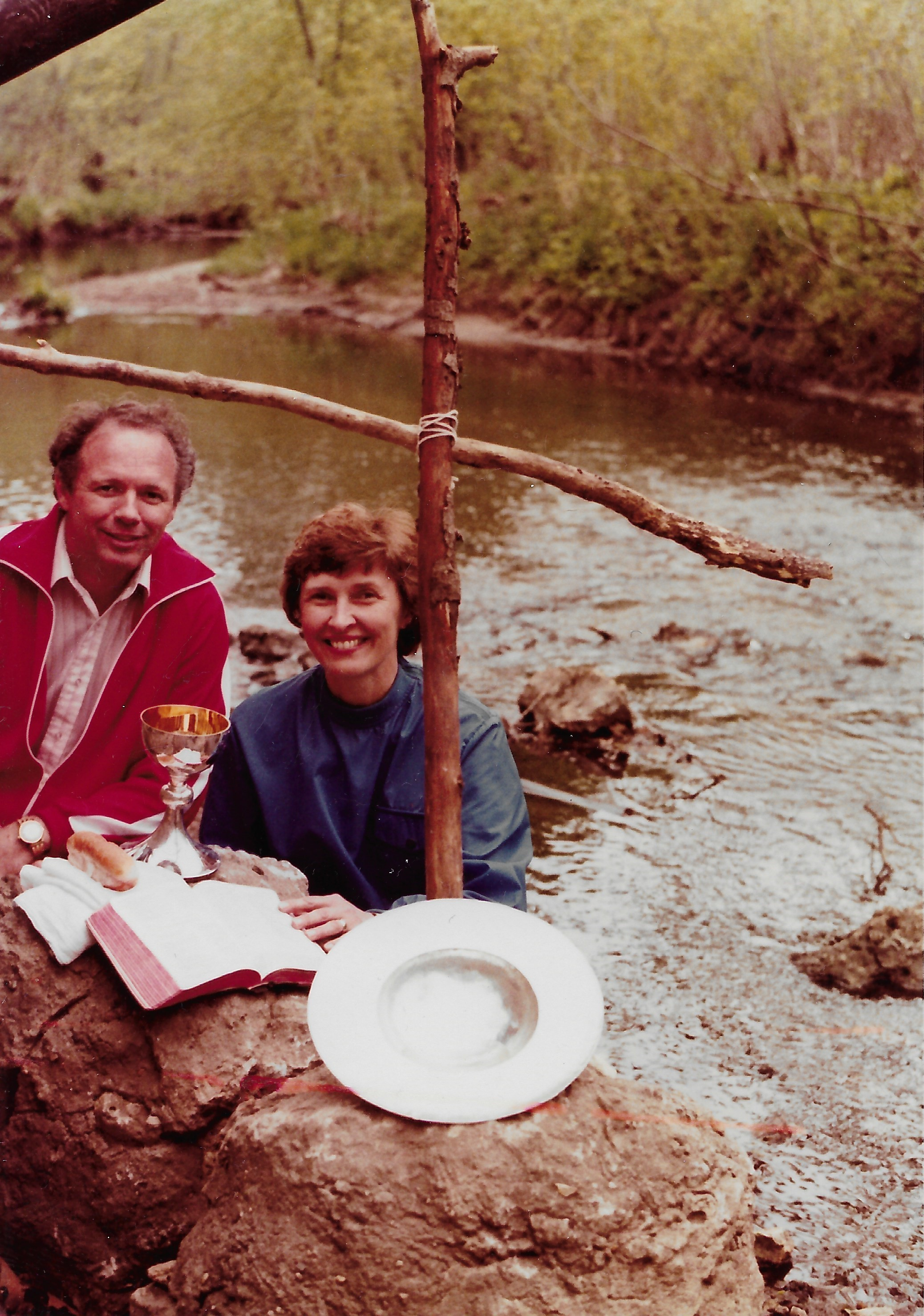
Jensen with her ELCA Global Mission predecessor, Mark Thomsen.

Jensen served as executive director of the former American Lutheran Church Women (ALCW), Minneapolis, Minnesota from 1981 to 1987. From 1982 to 1987, Jensen and her husband, served as co-hosts of Reflections, a 30-minute Christian television series. From 1993 to 1995, Jensen served as director for planning and evaluation and program director for Papua New Guinea and the South Pacific for the Evangelical Lutheran Church in America.

=== ELCA Global Mission ===
Jensen became the director the ELCA Global Mission in 1995. Under her leadership in mission education, the ELCA companion synod program grew its relationships between the ELCA's 65 synods and Lutheran churches overseas. The ELCA's 8,894 congregations are organized into synods across the United States and Caribbean. Under her leadership the ELCA Global Mission had a presence in 70 countries with 300 missionaries and volunteers, 47 division staff based, with annual expenditures of $29 million.

Jensen was also involved in Track II diplomacy, serving on the Lutheran World Federation (LWF) in Geneva, Switzerland during the 1980s, during this time the LWF had a NGO chair at the United Nations.

== Personal life ==
In 1957, she married Richard A. Jensen. They had three children together, Doron, Dodi, and Derek.

== Legacy ==
Jensen served on the board of Dana College and upon her retirement in 2003, she was awarded an honorary doctorate in divinity for her work in her field. She previously received an honorary doctorate from Wartburg Theological Seminary in 1997. She is noted as the first female to take leadership role within the ELCA and was one of the earliest feminist leaders in Lutheranism.

=== Honorary degrees ===
Location	Date	School	Degree
Nebraska	May 2003	Dana College	Doctor of Divinity (DDiv)
Iowa	May 1997	Wartburg Theological Seminary	Doctor of Divinity (DDiv)

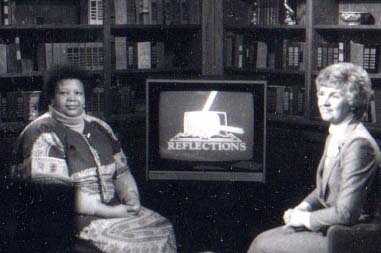
Jensen on the set of Reflections.
