= Franklin Clark Fry =

American Lutheran clergyman

- Time magazine cover on April 7, 1958
- Born: August 30, 1900; Bethlehem, Pennsylvania
- Died: June 6, 1968 (aged 67); New Rochelle, New York
- Other name: Mr. Protestant
- Education: Lutheran Theological Seminary at Philadelphia

Ecclesiastical career
- Religion: Lutheranism
- Church: United Lutheran Church in America (ULCA); Lutheran Church in America (LCA)
- Ordained: June 10, 1925
- Offices held: President, ULCA (1944–1962); President, LCA (1963–1968); President, LWF

Franklin Clark Fry (August 30, 1900 – June 6, 1968) was a leading American Lutheran clergyman, known for his work on behalf of interdenominational unity.

== Early years ==
Fry's parents were Franklin Foster Fry and Minnie C. Fry, née McKeown. He was born in Bethlehem, Pennsylvania, on August 30, 1900; he had no brothers or sisters. He attended Hamilton College in Clinton, New York; the American School of Classical Studies at Athens; and the Lutheran Theological Seminary at Philadelphia, Pennsylvania. He was ordained in Ithaca on June 10, 1925. Following his ordination, Fry served as pastor for congregations in Yonkers, New York, and Akron, Ohio.

== Interdenominational work ==
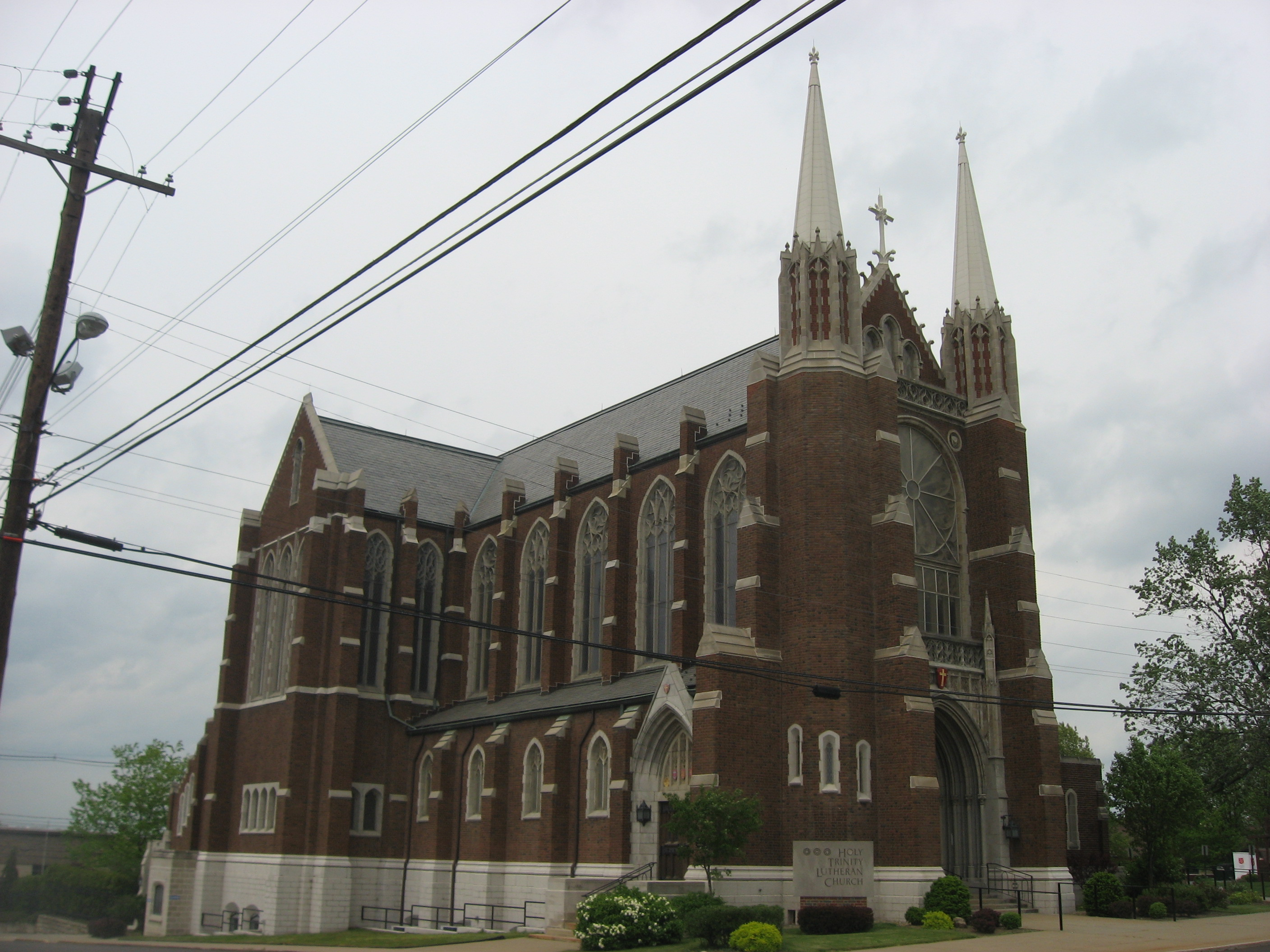
Akron's Holy Trinity Lutheran church, which Fry served for fifteen years

In 1944, Fry was elected president of the United Lutheran Church in America, one of the larger of many U.S. Lutheran denominations, which had been established in 1918 with the merger of three independent German synods. He expressed a wry ambivalence following his election, claiming that he "would much rather have a pastorate than squirt grease into ecclesiastical machinery".

Nonetheless, during his time as president, Fry became known among many church leaders as "Mr. Protestant", a moniker that captured his tireless work on behalf of greater unity among Protestant church bodies and made famous by the cover story on Fry in Time magazine in 1958. Seeing it as his mission to heal the Christian church's fragmentation into numerous splinter groups, Fry was a prime mover behind the formation of the Lutheran World Federation in 1947, the World Council of Churches in 1948, and the National Council of Churches in 1950. Among his many activities with these groups, Fry presided over the constituting convention of the National Council of Churches, and he headed the policy-making central committee of the World Council of Churches. He described the World Council as a means to "hold Christianity together, to keep the means of communication open, to keep conversation going even if there is no success in our lifetime." Fry also became president of the 72-million-member Lutheran World Federation in 1957.

== Forming the Lutheran Church in America ==
In the early 1960s, the nation's many independent Lutheran church bodies moved progressively toward greater unity. A number of such bodies merged in 1960, for example, to form the American Lutheran Church. From his position as head of the United Lutheran Church in America, Fry engineered a similar move in 1962, organizing the merger of his own church with three other independent bodies –- the Finnish Evangelical Lutheran Church of America, the American Evangelical Lutheran Church, and the Augustana Evangelical Lutheran Church –- to form the Lutheran Church in America (LCA), of which he was elected president.

Fry was elected as the head of the Lutheran World Federation in 1957 making him the most powerful figure among U.S. Lutherans, and one of the most influential leaders of world Protestantism. The new LCA cut across traditional ethnic distinctions among Finnish, Danish, German, and Swedish Lutherans, and with 3.3 million members was the largest Lutheran church body in the United States. Theologically, the LCA was most often considered the most liberal and ecumenical branch in American Lutheranism. In church governance, the LCA was clerical and centralistic, in contrast to the congregationalist or "low church" strain in American Christianity.

His accumulation of jobs was very impressive, serving as chairman of the policy making Central and Executive Committees of the World Council of Churches, and as a member of the Policy and Strategy Committee of the National Council of Churches. At the same time, he was president (since 1944) of the United Lutheran Church in America, a member of the Executive Committee of the National Lutheran Council, and the first American ever elected president of the 50-million-member Lutheran World Federation.

Fry lived in New Rochelle in Westchester, New York, commuting to his offices in Manhattan in the former J.P. Morgan mansion on Madison Avenue in Manhattan.

In 1962 he was chosen as "Clergy Churchman of the Year" by the Religious Heritage of America.

In January 1968, Fry issued a stirring appeal to fellow church members to "unstop your ears" to the need for a "massive improvement in the lot of Negro ghettos," warning of the prospects for "spiraling and spreading violence" if racial justice were not achieved swiftly.

Fry, as the Los Angeles Times put it several years after his death, was "known everywhere for his brilliant parliamentarian tactics, his shortcutting of time-consuming wrangles, the pungency with which he cut through intricate debate snarls, and for his wit and incisive dominance of any situation." He was also known as a fan of the New York Yankees baseball club.

== Death and aftermath ==
Fry resigned midway through his second four-year term as president of the LCA, only days before his death of cancer, when it became apparent that he had not long to live. The Rev. Dr. Robert J. Marshall, president of the LCA's Illinois Synod, was selected to fill the remainder of Fry's term, and Marshall went on to win the office in his own right in 1970. Fry died of cancer at New Rochelle Hospital on June 6, 1968.

His funeral, held at St. Thomas Episcopal Church in Manhattan, New York City, was attended by dozens of church leaders from around the world. Fry is buried at Augustus Lutheran Church in Trappe, Pennsylvania. His son, Franklin Drewes Fry, followed him into the ministry, was a leading clergyman in the ELCA, and died in 2006 at the age of 78. The Lutheran Church in America, meanwhile, followed Fry's ecumenical blueprint by merging in 1988 with two other Lutheran groups to form the Evangelical Lutheran Church in America, today the largest and most liberal U.S. Lutheran church body.
