= California–Nevada–Hawaii District of the Lutheran Church – Missouri Synod =

Subdivision of Christian denomination in the U.S.

California–-Nevada–Hawaii District of the LCMS

Location
- Country: United States
- Territory: Northern & Central California, Northern Nevada, & Hawaii
- Headquarters: Livermore, California

Statistics
- Congregations: 188
- Schools: 36 preschool; 32 elementary; 1 secondary
- Members: 39,000

Information
- Denomination: Lutheran Church – Missouri Synod
- Established: 1899

Current leadership
- President: Rev. Michael R. Lange

Map
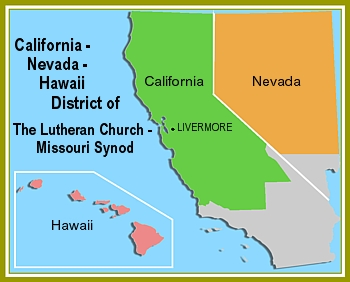

Website
- www.cnh-lcms.org

The California–Nevada–Hawaii District is one of the 35 districts of the Lutheran Church – Missouri Synod (LCMS), and encompasses the state of Hawaii, California with the exception of its eight southernmost counties, and Nevada with the exception of Clark County at its southern end. Southern California and the Las Vegas area form part of the Pacific Southwest District; in addition, three congregations in the San Francisco Bay Area are in the non-geographic English District. The California–Nevada–Hawaii District includes approximately 188 congregations and missions, subdivided into 19 circuits, as well as 36 preschools, 32 elementary schools and 1 high school. Baptized membership in district congregations is approximately 39,000.

The California–Nevada–Hawaii District was formed in 1899 as the California and Nevada District when the California and Oregon District was divided, also creating the Oregon and Washington District (renamed the Northwest District in 1948); the Southern California District (later renamed the Pacific Southwest District) was separated from the district's area in 1930. The district was renamed the California–Nevada–Hawaii District in 1985. District offices are located in Livermore, California. Delegates from each congregation meet in a convention every three years to elect the district president, vice presidents, circuit counselors, a board of directors, and other officers. The Rev. Michael R. Lange was elected to his first term as District President in 2018.

== Presidents ==
- Rev. J. M. Bühler, 1899–1901
- Rev. George P. Runkel, 1901–1905
- Rev. George A. Bernthal, 1905–1920
- Rev. J. W. Theiss, 1920–1924
- Rev. Arthur Clemens Henry Brohm, 1924–1945
- Rev. C. Fickenscher, 1945–1954
- Rev. Arthur C. Nitz, 1954–1959
- Rev. Paul E. Jacobs, 1959–1977
- Rev. Orval M. Oswald, 1977–1991
- Rev. Walter C. Tietjen, 1991–2003
- Rev. Robert D. Newton, 2003–2018
- Rev. Michael R. Lange, 2018–present

Jacobs resigned in protest in January 1977 following widespread criticism for his having ordained graduates of Seminex, and became bishop of the Pacific Regional Synod of the Association of Evangelical Lutheran Churches (AELC) before his death in September of that year.
