= Robert J. Marshall =

American clergyman and religious leader

Robert James Marshall (c. 1918 – December 22, 2008) was an American clergyman and religious leader who was president of the Lutheran Church in America in the 1970s, at the time the largest Lutheran church in the United States. During his leadership, he played a pivotal role in the merger of his Lutheran Church in America with the American Lutheran Church and the Association of Evangelical Lutheran Churches to form the Evangelical Lutheran Church in America.

== Early life and education ==
Marshall was born and raised in Burlington, Iowa. He grew up in a poor family, which helped him become more attuned to the concerns of those who were disadvantaged. Marshall graduated from Wittenberg University in 1941 with a Bachelor of Arts degree and from the Chicago Lutheran Theological Seminary in 1944. Marshall received a PHD from the University of Chicago.

== Ministerial and academic career ==
He spent three years as the pastor of a California church. He became a professor of Old Testament Interpretation at the Chicago Lutheran School of Theology (now the Lutheran School of Theology at Chicago. Marshall was hired by Muhlenberg College, where he was later appointed as head of the school's religion department. He served as president of the Lutheran Illinois Synod until 1968.

In balloting at the Lutheran Church in America's biannual convention held in June 1966 in Kansas City, Missouri, Marshall received 70 of the 615 votes cast for president, behind Rev. Franklin Clark Fry, who was re-elected to another four-year term with 489 votes.

Marshall was elected in June 1968 to serve as president of the Lutheran Church in America, succeeding Franklin Clark Fry, who had died earlier that month. Marshall was installed in ceremonies held at Riverside Church in October 1968, with clergymen from around the world in attendance. Marshall was elected to a full four-year term at the biannual convention held in Minneapolis in June 1970, receiving 545 votes out of the 593 cast.

On March 31, 1978, Marshall announced that he would not seek re-election to another term as president, and would instead take a position with the Lutheran World Ministries. In an interview with The New York Times, Marshall pointed to successful fundraising, adoption of a new book of worship and ecumenical outreach to the Episcopal, Roman Catholic and evangelical movements as among his achievements. He stated that the reasons for his decision were not based on health but reflected his desire for "some new vision to come in".

== Legacy ==
During his ten years in the office, Marshall led the 3 million-member group and restructured the church's ministries in the United States and around the world.

In 1976 in Philadelphia, at the 41st International Eucharistic Congress, an interfaith ecumenical gathering of scholars and church leaders, Marshall received a lengthy standing ovation after opening his remarks with the two words "Fellow Christians". He continued his remarks by noting that "we should not exalt our differences, we should work on them".

In 1988, building on the outreach and dialogue that Marshall had worked on, the Evangelical Lutheran Church in America was formed by the merger of the relatively liberal Lutheran Church in America with the more conservative American Lutheran Church and Association of Evangelical Lutheran Churches. The combined body had 10,500 congregations and 4.8 million members in the United States and the Caribbean by the time of Marshall's death.

== Death ==
Marshall died at age 90 on December 22, 2008, of heart failure in Allentown, Pennsylvania. He was buried in Burlington, Iowa.
