= Pacific Lutheran Theological Seminary =

Lutheran (ELCA) seminary in Berkeley, California

Pacific Lutheran Theological Seminary of California Lutheran University
- Type: Seminary
- Established: 1950
- Religious affiliation: Evangelical Lutheran Church in America
- Academic affiliations: Graduate Theological Union
- Endowment: $20 million
- Rector: Raymond Pickett
- Faculty: 7 Full Time
- Postgraduates: 54
- Location: Berkeley, California, United States; 37°52′11″N 122°16′13″W
- Campus: Urban
- Website: www.plts.edu

Pacific Lutheran Theological Seminary (PLTS) is a private Lutheran seminary in Berkeley, California. It is affiliated with California Lutheran University and is a member school of the Graduate Theological Union.

== History ==
Pacific Lutheran Theological Seminary was founded in 1950 and held its first classes in 1952 as a seminary of the United Lutheran Church in America, later the Lutheran Church in America and American Lutheran Church and currently the Evangelical Lutheran Church in America (ELCA). As one of seven seminaries training ministers and educators for the ELCA, PLTS was preceded by a school called the Pacific Lutheran Seminary, which was located first in Portland, Oregon, and then in Seattle, Washington, from 1910 to 1934.

On January 1, 2014, PLTS became the seminary of California Lutheran University located in Thousand Oaks, California.

PLTS provides theological education for the training of clergy and lay leaders through ordination, non-ordination, and research level degrees and certificates. The seminary relocated from its hilltop campus to 2000 Center Street in 2017.

== Academics ==
PLTS has nine faculty members, two adjunct faculty members, and five emeriti faculty members. The seminary offers the following degrees and certificates: Master of Divinity, Master of Theological Studies, Certificate of Theological Studies, and Certificate of Advanced Theological Studies. In collaboration with the Graduate Theological Union, PLTS offers two degrees: Master of Arts and Doctor of Philosophy or Theology. The seminary serves all of the ELCA and has specific ties to Regions 1 and 2 and the eleven synods of the western U.S. PLTS was founded to meet the missional needs of the Lutheran Church in the western United States. PLTS was a founding member of the Graduate Theological Union.

PLTS partners with eleven ELCA synods and with the national units of the ELCA, and several foundations. Together they have worked to develop the Theological Education for Emerging Ministries program.

On April 24, 2009, the Board of Directors of PLTS voted unanimously to seek a Reconciling in Christ (RIC) designation from Lutherans Concerned/North America (LC/NA), the first seminary in the ELCA to do so.
