= Evangelical Lutheran Church of Canada =

- Classification: Protestant
- Orientation: Lutheran
- Origin: 1967
- Branched from: American Lutheran Church
- Merged into: Evangelical Lutheran Church in Canada
- Defunct: 1986

The Evangelical Lutheran Church of Canada (ELCC) was a Lutheran Christian denomination active in Canada from 1967 to 1985. Prior to gaining autonomy, its congregations comprised the Canada District of the American Lutheran Church. The first presiding officer of the ELCC was Karl Holfeld.

On January 1, 1986, the ELCC merged with the Lutheran Church in America - Canada Section, to form the Evangelical Lutheran Church in Canada.
