= Will Herzfeld =

Willie Lawrence Herzfeld (June 9, 1937 – May 9, 2002) was an American clergyman and civil rights activist who was presiding bishop for the Association of Evangelical Lutheran Churches. He was the first African American to lead a national Lutheran church body in the United States. Additionally, he served as pastor of Bethlehem Lutheran Church in Oakland from 1973 to 1992.
