= ShaChelle Devlin Manning =

ShaChelle Devlin Manning is an American business person involved in the commercialization of nanotechnology.

== Education ==
Manning graduated in 1990 from Loras College in Dubuque, Iowa with a BA in English and Communications. She received an MBA from the University of Dallas.

== Career ==
From 1998 to 2002, she was Vice President for Winstar Communications, where she introduced wireless and internet technology.

=== Nanotechnology ===
In 2002 Manning became Director of Alliances at Zyvex Corporation, a nanotechnology company with research partnerships with United States governmental agencies such as DARPA, NIST, NASA, and the DoE. In 2005, she became a consultant to the Governor of the State of Texas as Director of Advanced Technology Alliances where she promoted the development of the Texas nanotechnology strategic plan, including a $30 Million fund to attract researchers in nanotechnology. In 2007 Manning joined Authentix, a Texas nanotechnology company.

In 2011, Manning co-founded MalibuIQ, LLC, an entrepreneurial private investment partnership in Malibu, California

She has been a board member for several organizations, including Astrotech Corporation and Loras College. She cofounded The Virtual Wall, an online site honoring Vietnam veterans.
