= Charles Bradley (footballer) =

English footballer (1922–1984)

Personal information
- Full name: Charles Bradley
- Date of birth: 15 May 1922
- Place of birth: York, England
- Date of death: 23 July 1984 (aged 62)
- Place of death: York, North Yorkshire, England
- Position: Inside forward

Senior career*
Years	Team	Apps	(Gls)
- York Railway Institute
1941–1947	York City	10	(2)
1948–????	Scarborough		
Total		10	(2)
- * Club domestic league appearances and goals

Charles Bradley (15 May 1922 – 23 July 1984) was an English professional footballer who played as an inside forward in the Football League for York City, in non-League football for York Railway Institute and Scarborough, and played wartime football for York.
