= Kay Kurt =

American new realist painter (born 1944)

- Born: March 21, 1944 (age 82); Dubuque, Iowa
- Education: University of Wisconsin, Madison (MFA)
- Spouse: Klaus Jankofsky

Kay Kurt (born March 21, 1944) is an American new realist painter known for her large-scale candy paintings.

== Biography ==
Kurt was born in Dubuque, Iowa. She attended Clark College in her home town, earning a BFA in 1966. In 1968 she completed an MFA in painting from the University of Wisconsin, Madison. Kurt discovered her niche while standing in line at an ice cream parlor. While waiting in line, she peered down at a box of white chocolates and was instantly inspired to paint. Kurt bought the box of chocolates and immediately went back to her studio. After rearranging the chocolates, she stretched a 5 x 12-foot canvas, the largest she had ever done at the time. Utilizing a rudimentary grid, the chocolates were enlarged from one inch to one foot and then sketched in with charcoal. Kurt typically paints a single candy in the middle of the composition, which serves as the keystone for the rest of the painting. After hours of diligent labor, For All Their Innocent Airs, They Know Exactly They’re Going was created.

Typical candies featured in her oeuvre include licorice, bon bons, jordan almonds, jujubes and gummi bears. Kurt chooses and collects these candies from various countries, specifically interested in those of German origin, which reflect the values, attitudes, and cultures associated with the people who produce them. Kurt prefers painting generic-looking candy, as the luxurious ones are too refined for her taste. The sole instance of exquisite candy in her oeuvre is a Godiva chocolate box painting that she made for a friend. Her choice of subject reflects her interest in mass production and consumer culture around the world.

Kurt creates her paintings using the physical objects in front of her as a reference, rather than looking at photographs. Her painting technique involves sketching a rudimentary grid and patiently painting each object one at a time using oil paint and multiple brushes. In combination with her methodical, laborious painting technique and the grand scale of her works, most of her pieces take roughly 1–4 years to complete. Her first major painting entitled For All Their Innocent Airs, They Know Exactly Where They’re Going (1968) measures 5 x 12 feet and depicts an open box of candies in various shapes and pastel hues, which the artist chose based on the differing textures, colors, and lighting effects. The intense frontal formality of the piece is common throughout her major candy works.

Kurt chooses to create large-scale compositions because of the powerful effect it has on the viewer. "I thought that if I really blew [the candies] up, one inch to one foot, then they would have a whole different effect visually~~.~~ How do you relate the size of your body to the size of the candy? You get a different energy, rhythm, that pushes it completely". In the process of making For All Their Innocent Airs, They Know Exactly Where They’re Going, she was concerned that her painting may appear to be an advertisement. Another benefit of painting in large-scale is that more information on the subject can be produced, which not only diminishes the potential advertisement misperception, it also empowers and adds a lively energy to it. Kurt is associated with both the super-realist and pop art movements, which explains her fine eye for detail and her choice of subject matter.

Through her friend and fellow artist Jack Beal, Kurt met Ivan C. Karp, then Assistant Director of the Leo Castelli Gallery. Karp showed her work to gallerist Jill Kornblee, who began showing Kurt's paintings at the Kornblee Gallery in New York City in 1968. A year later her work was featured in London's Hayward Gallery Pop Art exhibition, curated by John Russell, then art critic of The Sunday Times, and artist and art critic Suzi Gablik. Kurt was one of the youngest artists included in the exhibition and was also one of the only women. Her work was later featured in the 1973 Whitney Biennial and in numerous other group and solo exhibitions throughout the 1980s and 1990s.

Aside from a brief tenure in (Germany) in 1968–69, Kurt has remained in the Midwest. She moved to Duluth, Minnesota when her husband, Medieval scholar Klaus Jankofsky, began teaching at the University of Minnesota, Duluth in 1969. She continues to live and work in Duluth today.

== Exhibitions ==
- 1968 Kornblee Gallery, New York, [Group Show]
- 1968 Swarthmore College, Swarthmore, Pennsylvania, "The Big Detail"
- 1969 Finch College, New York, "The Dominant Woman"
- 1969 Hayward Gallery, London, England, "Pop Art"
- 1970 Kornblee Gallery, New York, [One-Woman Show]
- 1971 Neuberger Art Museum, SUNY Purchase, New York, "New Realism"
- 1972 Suffolk Museum, Virginia, "Unmanly Art"
- 1972 Cleveland Museum of Art, Ohio, "Contemporary Realists"
- 1973 Whitney Museum of American Art, New York, Whitney Biennial
- 1974 Land Art Gallery at Scripps College, Claremont, California, "The Fine Art of Food"
- 1978 Whitney Museum of American Art, Downtown Branch, New York, "Out of the House"
- 1978 Kornblee Gallery, New York, "Some Observations About Scale"
- 1979 Kornblee Gallery, New York, "Grand Paintings" [Ten Year One-Woman Retrospective]
- 1980 Walker Art Center, Minneapolis, Minnesota "Kay Kurt: Paintings" [traveling exhibition]
- 1983 Kornblee Gallery, New York, [One-Woman Show]
- 1985 San Francisco Museum of Modern Art, California, "American Realism, 20th Century Drawings and Watercolors"
- 1991 Museum of Art, Dubuque, Iowa, "A Closer Look" [One-Woman Show]
- 1995 Artworks Gallery WARM/Duluth Chapter, Minneapolis, Minnesota, [Inaugural Group Show]
- 1997 Duluth Art Institute, Duluth, Minnesota, "Celebrate: Women in the Arts" [traveling exhibition]
- 2010 University of the Arts, Philadelphia, Pennsylvania, "Seductive Subversion: Women Pop Artists, 1958–1968" [traveling exhibition]

== Collections ==
- Corcoran Gallery of Art, Washington, D.C.
- Boise Art Museum, Glenn C. Janss Collection, Boise ID
- Neuberger Museum of Art, SUNY, Purchase NY
- Metropolitan Museum of Art, New York NY
- Tweed Museum of Art, University of Minnesota, Duluth MN
- Walker Art Center, Minneapolis MN
- Whitney Museum of American Art, New York NY

== Works ==
- For All Their Innocent Airs, They Know Exactly Where They're Going
- Weingummi
- Weingummi II
- L'Icarus
- Green Jujube Alligator
- Yellow Jujube Lion
- Orange Jujube Elephant
- Just the Four of Us
- Jujubes from the National
- Hold It!
- Red 'C'
- X-Mas Candies
- Jordan Almonds
- Triptych
- Frankenstein's Monster
- Minnesota Landscape
- Disco Sound

== Bibliography ==
1. "Kay Kurt: Resume," http://www.kaykurt.com/kaykurtresume.htm.
2. Kay Kurt, "Artist Statement." http://www.kaykurt.com/kaykurtartiststatement.htm.
3. "Kay Kurt in the Press," http://www.kaykurt.com/kaykurtpress.htm.
4. John Russell, ""Kay Kurt and Others" [Review]", New York Times, December 9, 1983.
5. John Russell, "2 Unsung Painters", New York Times, December 21, 1979.
6. Hilton Kramer, "Art: 2 Interesting Talents Make Debut", New York Times, June 13, 1970, pg. 26.'
7. Hilton Kramer, "Nowadays It's Terribly Hard to Be Scandalous," New York Times, July 27, 1969, pg. D19.
8. "50 Years/50 Artworks. 49. Kay Kurt, Jordan Almonds (1975–79)." http://www.d.umn.edu/tma/collections/language/cat49.html
9. Sid Sachs and Kalliopi Minioudaki, Seductive Subversion: Women Pop Artists, 1958–1968. Philadelphia, PA: University of the Arts, Philadelphia, 2010.
