= Hilda Siller =

American poet and short story writer

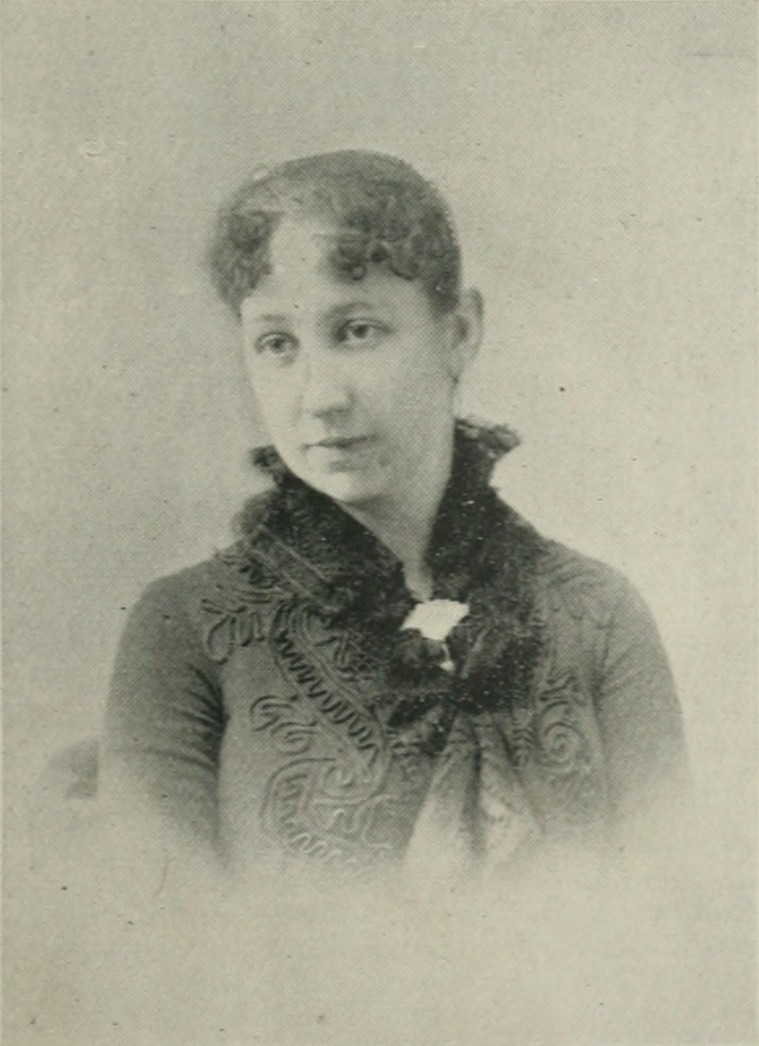
- Portrait from A Woman of the Century
- Born: August 7, 1861; Dubuque, Iowa
- Died: October 8, 1945 (aged 84); Tryon, North Carolina
- Occupation: writer
- Writing career
- Pen name: Hilda
- Genres: poetry; short stories

Hilda Siller (pen name, Hilda; August 7, 1861 – October 8, 1945) was an American poet and short story writer. Although given to the writing of poetry, she was practical in her composition. Siller was also something of a linguist, a musician, and had was said to have "views".

== Early life and education ==
Hilda (or Hulda) Louise Siller was born in Dubuque, Iowa, (Note: Familysearch records Siller's place of birth as Milwaukee, Wisconsin.) August 7, 1861. Her father was Frank Siller (1835-1911), of Milwaukee, Wisconsin, who was known as "the German poet" but who emigrated to the U.S. from Saint Petersburg, Russia, when he was a boy of fifteen. Her mother's maiden name was Sarah Ann Baldwin (1834-1884); she was an English woman. Hilda's siblings were: Charles (b. 1863) and Frederick (b. 1875).

She studied music with the best teachers in Europe as well as in Milwaukee, including the works of Frédéric Chopin and Ludwig van Beethoven.

== Career ==
Siller inherited from her parents a love of literature and art. She used the pen name, "Hilda". She wrote for Our Continent, later for the Springfield, Massachusetts Republican, Boston Transcript, New York Post, Chicago Inter Ocean, The South, and the St. Louis Globe-Democrat. She wrote regularly for the Wisconsin Weekly, and other Wisconsin papers generally.

The fact that father and daughter were both poets and both possessed conspicuous German traits gave them a sort of unified personality. Both had striking artistic temperaments and the same appreciation of humor, though the latter did not show itself in her poetic writings. On the contrary, the poems of Frank and Hilda Siller were alike distinguished for their pathos. They were widely translated from English into German and extensively copied in German periodicals.

== Personal life ==
Among Siller's characteristics was a noted indifference to "matters matrimonial".

In 1886, she left for Europe for a year.

Hilda Siller died October 8, 1945, in Tryon, North Carolina.

== Selected works ==
=== Poems ===
- "Nothing New" (1884)
- "An Echo" (1885)
- "One Soul" (translated from the German of Günther Walling) (1891)
- "The Boys" (1894)
- "Imperishable" (1908)

=== Short stories ===
- Her Chief Oddity (1884)
- "Something About Venice" (1887)
- "His Name" (1890)
