= Robert Reuland =

American novelist and attorney (born 1963)

Robert Charles Reuland
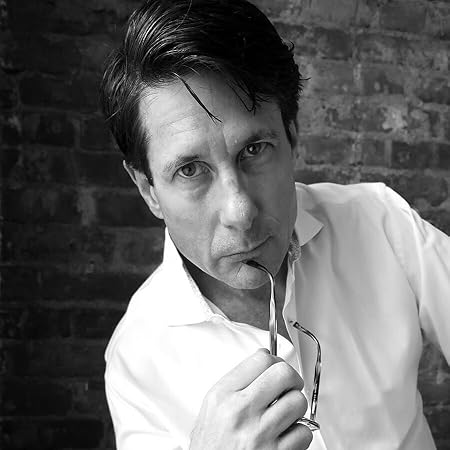
- Born: November 1, 1963 (age 63); Dallas, Texas
- Occupations: Novelist, Criminal Lawyer
- Writing career
- Period: 2001—present
- Genres: Literary fiction, Crime fiction

Robert Charles Reuland (born November 1, 1963) is an American novelist and attorney.

Reuland commenced his legal career in 1990 in Manhattan, working in the litigation departments of two large corporate firms before joining the district attorney's office in Brooklyn in 1996. Since 2001, Reuland has had a parallel career as a novelist. He is the author of two published novels, Hollowpoint (Random House 2001) and Semiautomatic (Random House 2004). Both books are set in the Brooklyn District Attorney's office, where Reuland was a prosecutor in the homicide bureau. Reuland gained national notoriety in 2001 when fired from his position after District Attorney Charles J. Hynes objected to his first book, Hollowpoint. Reuland brought a federal lawsuit claiming infringement of his First Amendment rights and prevailed at trial in 2004. Upon leaving the district attorney's office in 2001, Reuland established himself in private practice in New York City specializing in homicide defense and litigation to free persons wrongly convicted due to police and prosecutorial misconduct. Reuland took a hiatus from writing following the publication of his second novel in order to raise his children and devote more time to his criminal practice. His third novel, Brooklyn Supreme, was published in 2021.

Reuland's hard-edged but elegant writing is known for its gritty realism and has drawn praise from Dennis Lehane, Alan Furst, and George Pelecanos. A reviewer for the Washington Post referred to Semiautomatic as "the best-written legal thriller I've ever read, hands down." The New York Times said Hollowpoint "may just keep you up all night . . . Sometimes a murder story is just a murder story, but this is not one of those times." Marilyn Stasio of The New York Times called Reuland "a daring writer." Of Reuland's second novel, "Semiautomatic," Kirkus, in a starred review wrote, "Reuland is a real-life ADA, and if he prosecutes as effectively as he writes, Brooklyn is a lucky borough."

Born in Dallas, Texas, and raised in Dubuque, Iowa, Reuland has lived in Park Slope, Brooklyn, since 1990. He is a graduate of the University of Cambridge, where he was a member of Queens' College, and the Vanderbilt University Law School.

== Bibliography ==
Hollowpoint (2001)

Semiautomatic (2004)

Brooklyn Supreme (2021)
