= Moritz Thomsen =

American writer, farmer, and Peace Corps volunteer

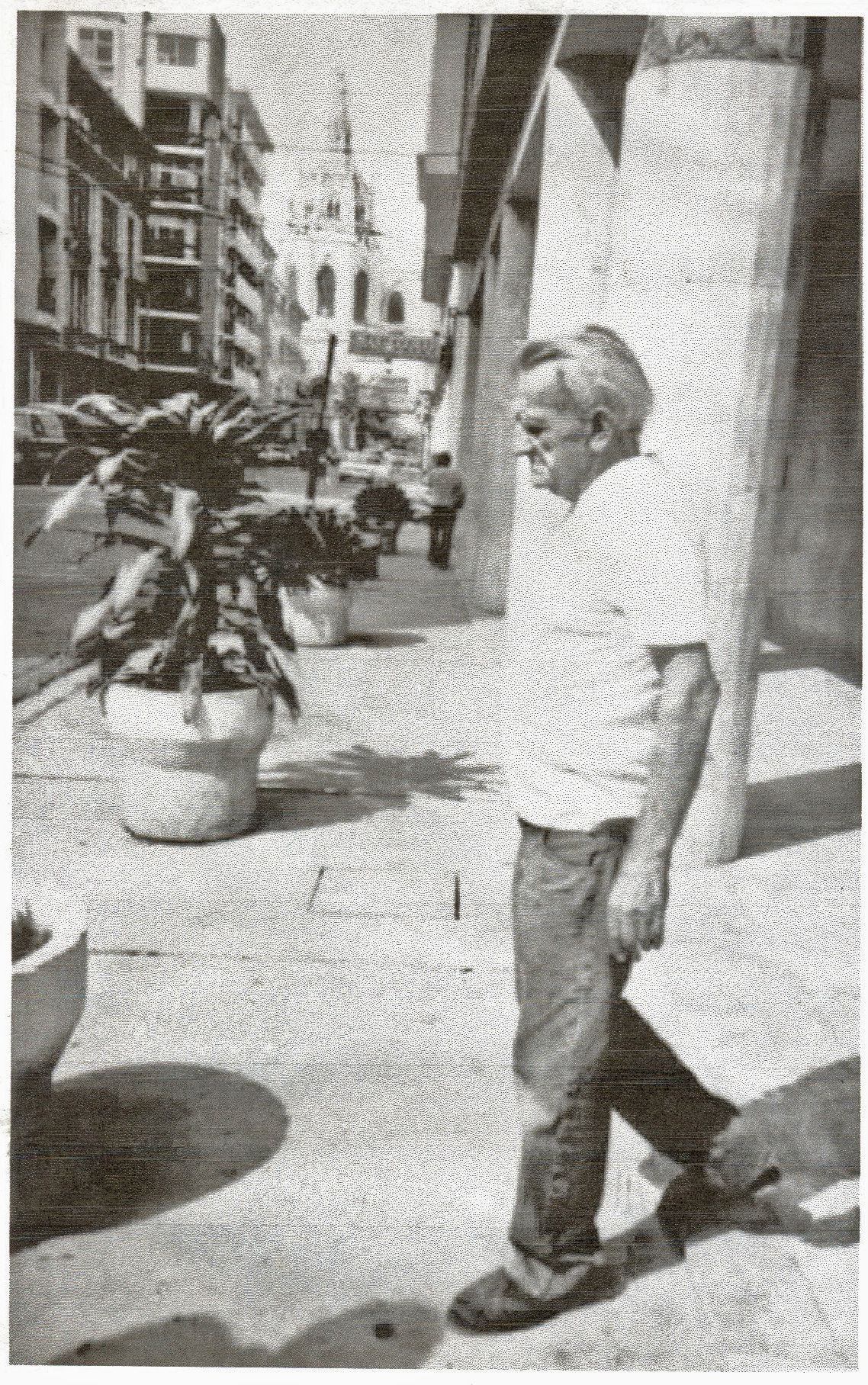
Thomsen in Ecuador circa 1990

Martin Moritz Thomsen Titus (1915–1991), known as Moritz Thomsen, was an American writer, farmer and Peace Corps volunteer. He worked and wrote in the small town of Rio Verde, Ecuador. His books have been praised by writers such as Paul Theroux, Thomas Cahill and Larry McMurtry.

== Early and later life ==
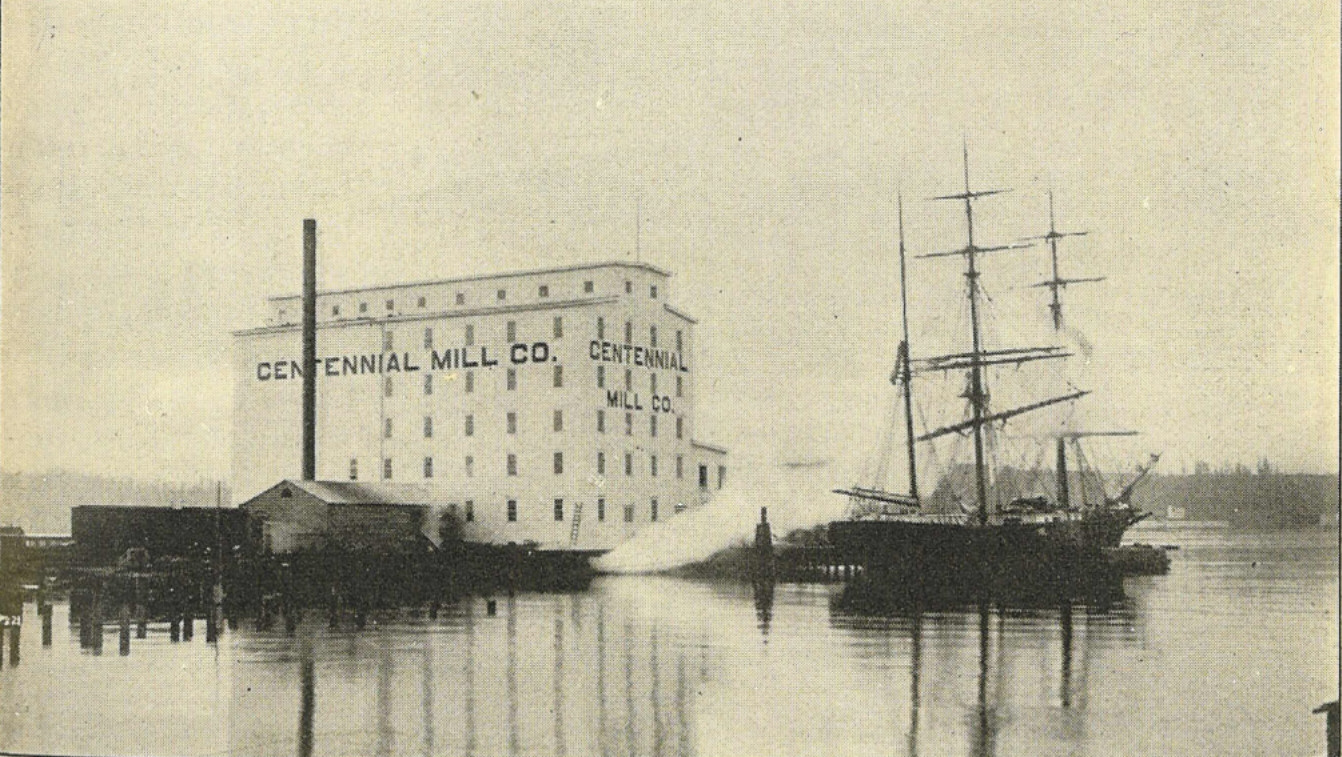
Chinese ship in harbor of Thomsen's family business circa 1898

Thomsen was born in 1915 into a wealthy American family in Seattle. His namesake was his grandfather, a powerful Washington businessman. Charlie, his father, was President of Centennial Mills (Krusteaz Brand) and a multi-millionaire at the turn of the 20th century. As detailed in his memoirs, his relationship with his father was extremely strained, with Thomsen describing the man as "tyrannical."

During World War II, Thomsen served as a B-17 Flying Fortress bombardier in the Eighth Air Force. At age 44 he was working as a farmer in California when he decided to join the Peace Corps. In 1964, at 48 years old, Thomsen went to Ecuador as one of the first Peace Corps volunteers. Upon arrival, and after many wanderings, he was assigned as agricultural expert to the small fishing town of Green River, north of the province of Esmeraldas. Thomsen lived for four years in that village, and a total of 35 years in Ecuador. After serving as a volunteer for four years, he remained in Ecuador. He died in 1991 of cholera.

== Writings ==
During his time in Ecuador, Thomsen wrote and published four books of memories and impressions, most of them on Ecuador and experience with poverty.

=== Living Poor: a Peace Corps Chronicle ===
The first of these books, Living Poor: a Peace Corps Chronicle originally appeared as a series of vignettes in the San Francisco Chronicle, in its Sunday edition. By 1968, these texts were collected, edited and appeared in the form of a printed book by University of Washington Press. From then until the present, the book has remained in print continuously, with editions in the US, UK, Germany and more recently France. In the US alone the book has sold over a hundred thousand copies. It was officially published in 1969 and is ranked as one of the best Peace Corps memoirs ever written.

=== Other works ===
Thomsen published a second book about his experience in Ecuador's agriculture in 1978: The Farm on the River of Emeralds and then, in 1989 and 1990 his two recent texts: The Saddest Pleasure: a Journey on Two Rivers , about his experiences in Ecuador and in a series of trips to Brazil. It won a 1991 Governor's Writers Award (now the Washington State Book Awards). In his introduction to The Best Travel Writing, 2005, author Tom Miller writes that The Saddest Pleasure: A Journey on Two Rivers "embodies some of the very finest elements of travel literature: constant doubt, a meddlesome nature, and a disregard for nationalism."

My Two Wars (published posthumously) looks at both his "tempestuous" relationship with his father and his experiences as a World War II bombardier.

A fifth Thomsen book, Bad News From a Black Coast, has been recently published (available on Amazon).

The San Francisco-based literary journal Zyzzyva published "The Bombardier's Handbook" in Winter 2013. A selection of entries from Thomsen's World War II diaries, "The Bombardier's Handbook" was selected as a Notable Essay in Best American Essays 2014. According to the introduction by Pat Joseph, Thomsen did not have his journals when he wrote his combat memoir, "My Two Wars."

== Legacy ==
Thomsen's literary work has been recognized and exalted by writers such as Paul Theroux, his personal friend and the prologue of The Saddest Pleasure, Tom Miller, Martha Gellhorn, Larry McMurtry, Wallace Stegner and Page, and Tony D'Souza. Thomsen received a number of literary awards, including the Washington State Book Award in 1991 and the Paul Cowan Award 1989. Since 1992, an organization named Peace Corps Writers awards an annual prize for the best short written about the experience of the body Peace named Moritz Thomsen Peace Corps Experience Award. Several scholarly studies affirm and confirm the idea, widespread among a wide group of readers, that Moritz Thomsen is one of the most important but least known of the second part of the twentieth century American writers.

Miller calls Thomsen "one of the great American expatriate writers of the twentieth century" and describes him as "A soft-hearted cuss, a man of almost insufferable integrity, a lousy farmer and a terrific writer." He describes Thomsen's style as one that "pledged allegiance to nothing except his station as an expatriate. And as an expat he was free to judge us all, an undertaking he finessed with acute observations, self-deprecation, and a flavorful frame of reference that ranged from a Tchaikovsky symphony to a Sealy Posturpedic mattress."

Thomsen was a descendant of the powerful Thomsen family of Washington. His grandfather, Mortiz Thomsen his namesake, was a renowned adventurer. John D. Rockefeller hailed him in a journal article as one of the 12 Men Who Shaped the West and a biography of his life Wind in His Sails chronicled his adventures. His grandfather started the first flour mill on the west coast in the 1800s. It is estimated that his father, Charles Thomsen would have been a billionaire in modern-day with inflation accounted for. Thomsen was also of related to the fellow Danish Jensen family of Minnesota.

== Worldview ==
Thomsen's worldview is reflected in a statement he once made: "Living poor is like being sentenced to exist in a stormy sea in a battered canoe, requiring all your strength simply to keep afloat; there is never any question of reaching a destination. True poverty is a state of perpetual crisis, and one wave just a little bigger or coming from an unexpected direction can and usually does wreck things."

== Bibliography ==
=== Selected works ===
- Living Poor: A Peace Corps Chronicle (1969; new edition by Eland in 2011)
- The Farm on the River of Emeralds (1978)
- The Saddest Pleasure: A Journey on Two Rivers (1990)
- My Two Wars (1996) (published posthumously)
- Bad News from a Black Coast (2018)
