= Timber Lodge Steakhouse =

Coordinates: 44°8′18.5″N 93°15′11″W

- Type: Wholly owned subsidiary Private
- Industry: Restaurants
- Genre: Casual dining
- Founded: 1991; 35 years ago
- Founder: Doron Jensen
- Headquarters: Bloomington, MN, US
- Number of locations: 1
- Area served: Minnesota
- Products: American cuisine
- Website: www.timberlodgesteakhouse.com

Timber Lodge Steakhouse is a single restaurant in Minnesota that was once a part of a larger American steakhouse chain that had eighty-five locations at its peak.

== Early history and growth ==
Timber Lodge Steakhouse Inc. was founded under the name Minnesota Steakhouse in September 1991 in Burnsville, Minnesota. The founder of Minnesota Steakhouse, Doron Jensen, changed the name to Timber Lodge in 1995 to make it more marketable in other areas of the country. After the founder split off due to conflicts with his business partner, the company grew from 16 Minnesota locations to 85. Restaurants ranged from New York to Arizona under mainly the name Timber Lodge Steakhouse, with a couple exceptions (Paul Bunyans Steakhouse in New York).

== Bankruptcy and closings ==
Bad locations plagued the company and it dwindled back down to a few Minnesota restaurants. All locations outside the state of Minnesota have closed. The chain operated 18 locations when it filed for Chapter 11 bankruptcy protection in 2006.

In August 2008 Taher Inc. acquired Timber Lodge Steakhouse Inc. Minnetonka-based Taher Inc., led by founder and CEO Bruce Taher, provides foodservice management for schools, senior-housing facilities and corporate cafeterias in 10 states. "They have really good food," Bruce Taher said about Timber Lodge. "They cook from scratch, which fits our culture of chef-driven restaurants, and I think they provide a good value to customers." Bob Campbell, who was part of the previous ownership group that consisted of 10 local investors, said it was a good deal. "I think it's a very positive change for Timber Lodge, our employees and our customers, and in the long run for our vendors and everyone else involved," he said. Timber Lodge was down to ten locations by the time of its sale to Taher.

In November 2009, restaurants closed in St. Cloud, and Rochester, Minnesota. As a result of the closings, a judge levied a $3.57 million judgment against Timber Lodge for not fulfilling its leases. The Fargo, North Dakota, location closed its doors on July 24, 2010. The Sioux Falls, South Dakota, location also closed late July 2010.

The Duluth location closed permanently on January 1, 2016. Owner Bruce Taher cited lack of customer parking, high rent, and the restaurant's large footprint as reasons for the closing. The Duluth restaurant had been located in the Waterfront Plaza building in Canal Park for 20 years.

Following the May 2019 closure of their Bloomington location, the independently owned Timber Lodge Steakhouse in Owatonna, Minnesota, became the only remaining location. In February 2020, the Owatonna restaurant was put up for sale.
