= Finnish Evangelical Lutheran Church of America =

Defunct Christian denomination in the United States

- Amerikan suomalainen evankelis-luterilainen kirkko
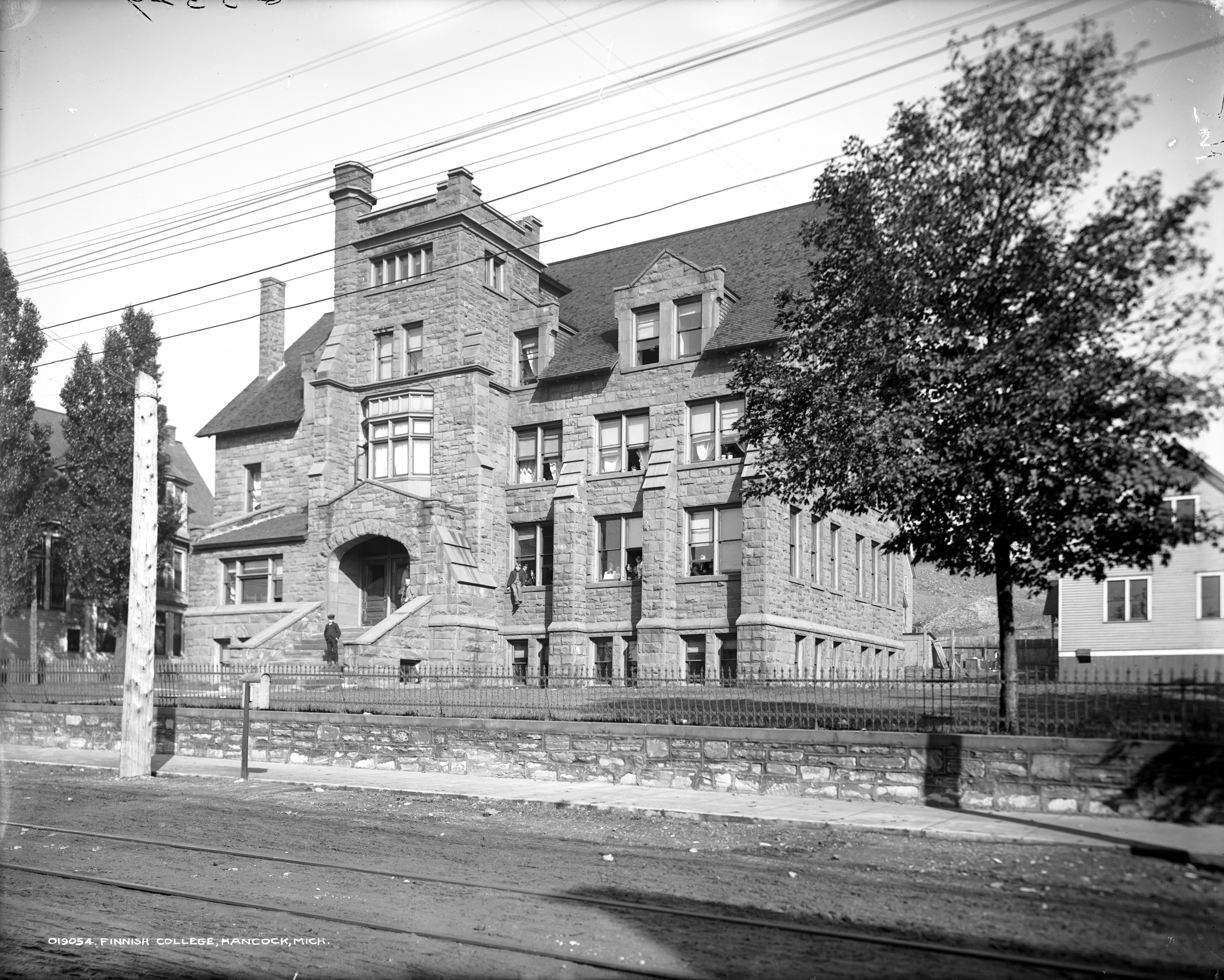
- Old Main at the FELC's Suomi College in Hancock, Michigan
- Classification: Protestant
- Orientation: Lutheran
- Region: Michigan and other states
- Headquarters: Calumet, Michigan
- Origin: March 25, 1890; Calumet, Michigan
- Branched from: Evangelical Lutheran Church of Finland
- Merged into: Lutheran Church in America (1962)
- Congregations: 153 (1961)
- Members: 36,274 (1961)
- Ministers: 105 (1961)
- Tertiary institutions: Suomi College and Theological Seminary
- Other name: Suomi Synod

The Finnish Evangelical Lutheran Church of America (commonly known as the Suomi Synod, Finnish: Amerikan suomalainen evankelis-luterilainen kirkko) was a Lutheran church body which existed in the United States from 1890 until 1962.

== History ==
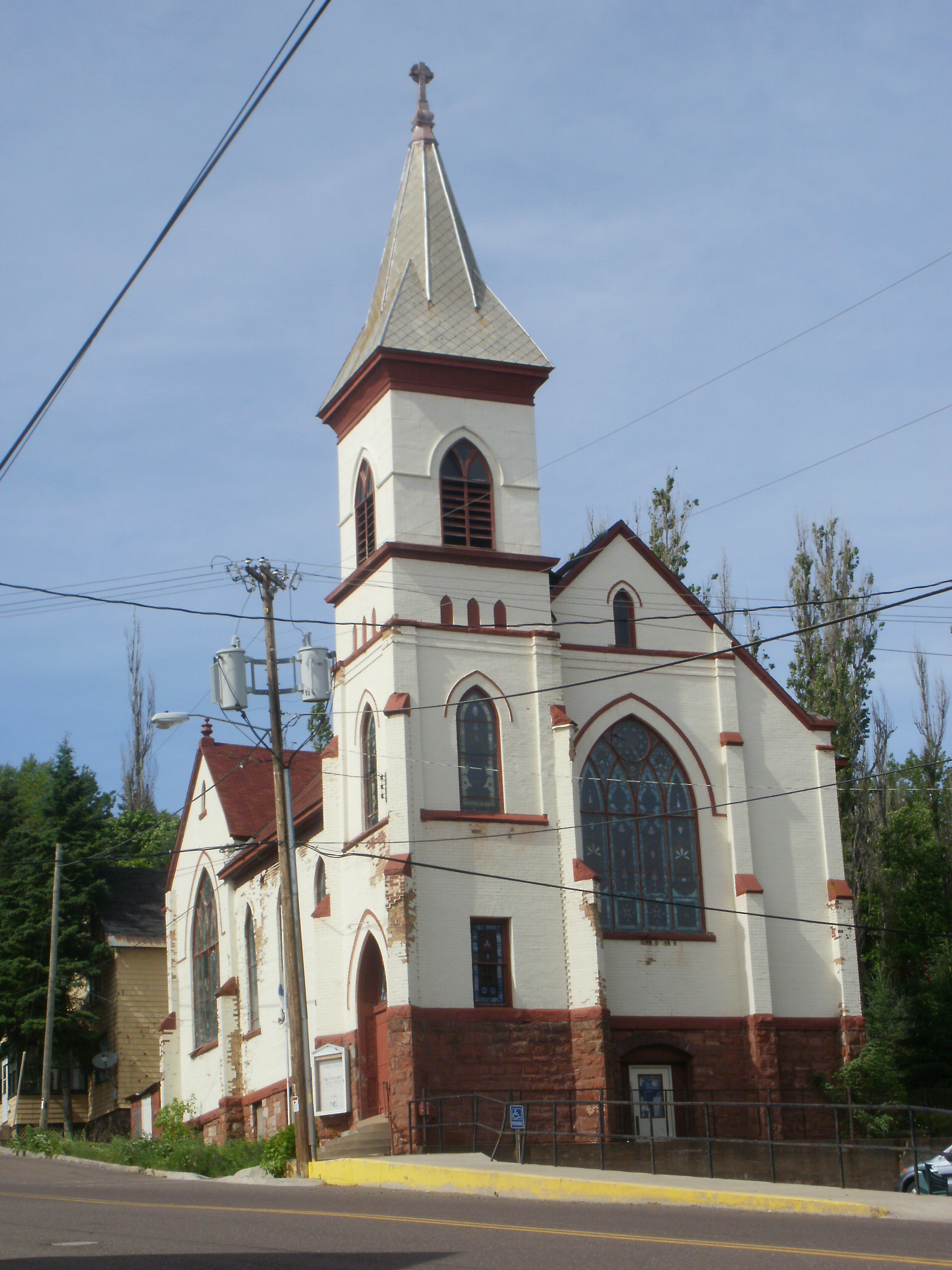
Finnish Evangelical Church in Hancock, Michigan

The Finnish Evangelical Lutheran Church of America (FELC) was organized at Calumet, Michigan in 1890. FELC was defined more by its Finnish ethnic origin than by any specific theological strain. In 1896, the church established Suomi College and Theological Seminary (now called Finlandia University) in Hancock, Michigan. At the time of its closure in 2023, Finlandia was the only private institution of higher learning in Michigan's Upper Peninsula and the only remaining university in North America founded by Finnish immigrants.

FELC was one of the Lutheran church bodies that merged into the Lutheran Church in America (LCA) in 1962. At that time, FELC had 36,274 members and 105 ministers in 153 congregations, and was the smallest of LCA's founding church bodies. The LCA was subsequently party to the merger that created the Evangelical Lutheran Church in America in 1988.

== Presidents ==
- Juho K. Nikander (1890–1898)
- Kaarle Leonard Tolonen (1898–1902)
- Juho K. Nikander (1902–1919)
- John Wargelin (1919–1919)
- Alvar Albert Rautalahti (1919–1922)
- Alfred Haapanen (1922–1950)
- John Wargelin (1950–1955)
- Raymond Waldemar Wargelin (1955–1962)

== See also ==
- National Evangelical Lutheran Church
- Apostolic Lutheran Church of America

== Other sources ==
- Wolf, Edmund Jacob (1889) The Lutherans in America; a story of struggle, progress, influence and marvelous growth (New York: J.A. Hill)
- Bente, F. (1919) American Lutheranism Volume II (St. Louis: Concordia Publishing House)
- Nichol, Todd W. (1986) All These Lutherans (Minneapolis: Augsburg Publishers)
