= Lutheran Church in America =

Defunct Christian denomination in the United States

- Classification: Protestant
- Orientation: Lutheran
- Structure: National church, middle level synods, and local congregations
- Associations: Lutheran World Federation; Lutheran Council in the United States of America
- Region: United States and Canada
- Headquarters: New York City, New York, U.S.
- Origin: 1962; Detroit, Michigan, U.S.
- Merger of: United Lutheran Church in America; Finnish Evangelical Lutheran Church of America; American Evangelical Lutheran Church; Augustana Evangelical Lutheran Church
- Separations: Evangelical Lutheran Church of Canada (1986)
- Merged into: Evangelical Lutheran Church in America (1988)
- Congregations: 5,832 (1986)
- Members: 2,896,138 (1986)
- Ministers: 8,586 (1986)

The Lutheran Church in America (LCA) was an American and Canadian Lutheran church body that existed from 1962 to 1987. It ceased to exist on January 1, 1988, as it joined with two other churches to form the Evangelical Lutheran Church in America (ELCA).

The LCA's immigrant heritage came mostly from Germany, Sweden, present-day Czech Republic, present-day Slovakia, Denmark, and Finland, and its demographic focus was on the East Coast (centered on Pennsylvania), with large numbers in the Midwest and some presence in the Southern Atlantic states.

Theologically, the LCA was often considered the most liberal and ecumenical branch in American Lutheranism, although there were tendencies toward conservative pietism in some rural and small-town congregations. In church governance, the LCA was clerical and centralized, in contrast to the congregationalist or "low church" strain in American Protestant Christianity. With some notable exceptions, LCA churches tended to be more formalistically liturgical than their counterparts in the American Lutheran Church (ALC). Among the Lutheran churches in America, the LCA was thus the one that was most similar to the established Lutheran churches in Europe.

The LCA ordained the country's first female Lutheran pastor, Elizabeth Platz, in November 1970. In 1970, a survey of 4,745 Lutheran adults by Strommen et al., found that 75 percent of LCA Lutherans surveyed agreed that women should be ordained, compared with 66 percent of ALC members and 45 percent of Lutheran Church–Missouri Synod members.

It subsequently ordained the nation's first female African-American Lutheran pastor (Earlean Miller in 1979), first Latina Lutheran pastor (Lydia Rivera Kalb in 1979), and first female Asian-American Lutheran pastor (Asha George-Guiser in 1982).

The LCA was headquartered in New York City and its publishing house was Fortress Press. It was a founding member of the Lutheran Council in the United States of America, which began on January 1, 1967.

== Formation ==
During the late 1950s and early 1960s, many of the independent US Lutheran church bodies moved progressively toward greater unity. In 1960, for example, a number of such bodies joined to form the American Lutheran Church.

The Lutheran Church in America was another product of these trends, forming in 1962 out of a merger among the following independent Lutheran denominations:

- The United Lutheran Church in America (ULCA), established in 1918 with the merger of three independent German-American synods: the General Synod, the General Council and the United Synod of the South. It was later joined by several synods with Slovak and Icelandic roots, thus becoming one of the first American Lutheran bodies to cross ethnic lines. This group, the largest Lutheran church body in the United States at the time, provided the bulk of the eventual LCA's membership.
- The Finnish Evangelical Lutheran Church of America (Suomi Synod), established in 1890.
- The American Evangelical Lutheran Church, traditionally a Danish-American Lutheran denomination, established in 1872.
- The Augustana Evangelical Lutheran Church, traditionally a Swedish-American Lutheran denomination, established in 1860.

The merger was largely engineered through the efforts of Franklin Clark Fry, who had served as president of the United Lutheran Church in America since 1944 and president of the Lutheran World Federation since 1957. Fry was known by contemporaries as "Mr. Protestant", a moniker that captured his tireless work on behalf of greater ecumenical unity among Protestant church bodies.

The merger was made official and celebrated at a convention in Detroit, Michigan, on June 28, 1962. Upon its inception, the LCA became the largest Lutheran church body in the United States.

== Merger into the ELCIC and ELCA ==
On January 1, 1986, Lutheran Church in America-Canada Section merged with the Evangelical Lutheran Church of Canada to form the Evangelical Lutheran Church in Canada. On January 1, 1988, the Lutheran Church in America ceased to exist when its US section, along with the American Lutheran Church and the Association of Evangelical Lutheran Churches, joined together to form the Evangelical Lutheran Church in America (ELCA), today the largest Lutheran church body in the United States. In 1986, just before its merger into the ELCA, the LCA had 8,586 pastors, 5,832 congregations, and 2,896,138 members, making it the largest Lutheran church body in the United States.

== Presidents/Bishops ==
- 1962–1968 Franklin Clark Fry
- 1968–1978 Robert J. Marshall
- 1978–1987 James R. Crumley Jr.

Title changed to Bishop in 1980.

== Educational institutions ==
=== Colleges ===
- Augustana College (Illinois), Rock Island, Illinois
- Bethany College (Kansas), Lindsborg, Kansas
- California Lutheran College, Thousand Oaks, California
- Carthage College, Kenosha, Wisconsin
- Gettysburg College, Gettysburg, Pennsylvania
- Gustavus Adolphus College, St. Peter, Minnesota
- Lenoir Rhyne College, Hickory, North Carolina
- Midland University, Fremont, Nebraska
- Muhlenberg College, Allentown, Pennsylvania
- Newberry College, Newberry, South Carolina
- Roanoke College, Salem, Virginia
- Susquehanna University, Selinsgrove, Pennsylvania
- Thiel College, Greenville, Pennsylvania
- Upsala College, East Orange, New Jersey (now closed)
- Wagner College, Staten Island, New York
- Waterloo Lutheran University, Waterloo, Ont., Canada
- Wittenberg University, Springfield, Ohio
- Grand View University, Des Moines, Iowa
- Suomi College, Hancock, Michigan (2-yr.) (4 year Finlandia University 1996-2023, now closed)

=== Seminaries ===
- Hamma School of Theology, Springfield, Ohio (Merged with Evangelical Lutheran Theological Seminary of the ALC to form Trinity Lutheran Seminary in Columbus, Ohio in 1978)
- Lutheran School of Theology at Chicago, Illinois
- Lutheran Theological Seminary, Gettysburg, Pennsylvania
- Lutheran Theological Seminary, Philadelphia, Pennsylvania
- Lutheran Theological Seminary, Saskatoon, Saskatchewan, Canada (shared with ELCC)
- Lutheran Theological Southern Seminary, Columbia, South Carolina
- Northwestern Lutheran Theological Seminary, Saint Paul, Minnesota; (shared with ALC)
- Pacific Lutheran Theological Seminary, Berkeley, California (shared with ALC)
- Waterloo Lutheran Seminary, Waterloo, Ont., Canada

== Conventions ==
- 1962 LCA Constituting Convention, Detroit, Michigan
- 1964 LCA Convention, Pittsburgh, Pennsylvania
- 1966 LCA Convention, Kansas City, Missouri
- 1968 LCA Convention, Atlanta, Georgia
- 1970 LCA Convention, Minneapolis, Minnesota
- 1972 LCA Convention, Dallas, Texas
- 1974 LCA Convention, Baltimore, Maryland
- 1976 LCA Convention, Boston, Massachusetts
- 1978 LCA Convention, Chicago, Illinois
- 1980 LCA Convention, Seattle, Washington
- 1982 LCA Convention, Louisville, Kentucky
- 1984 LCA Convention, Toronto, Ontario
- 1986 LCA Convention, Milwaukee, Wisconsin
- 1987 LCA Closing Convention, Columbus, Ohio
