= Doron Jensen =

American restaurateur (born 1958)

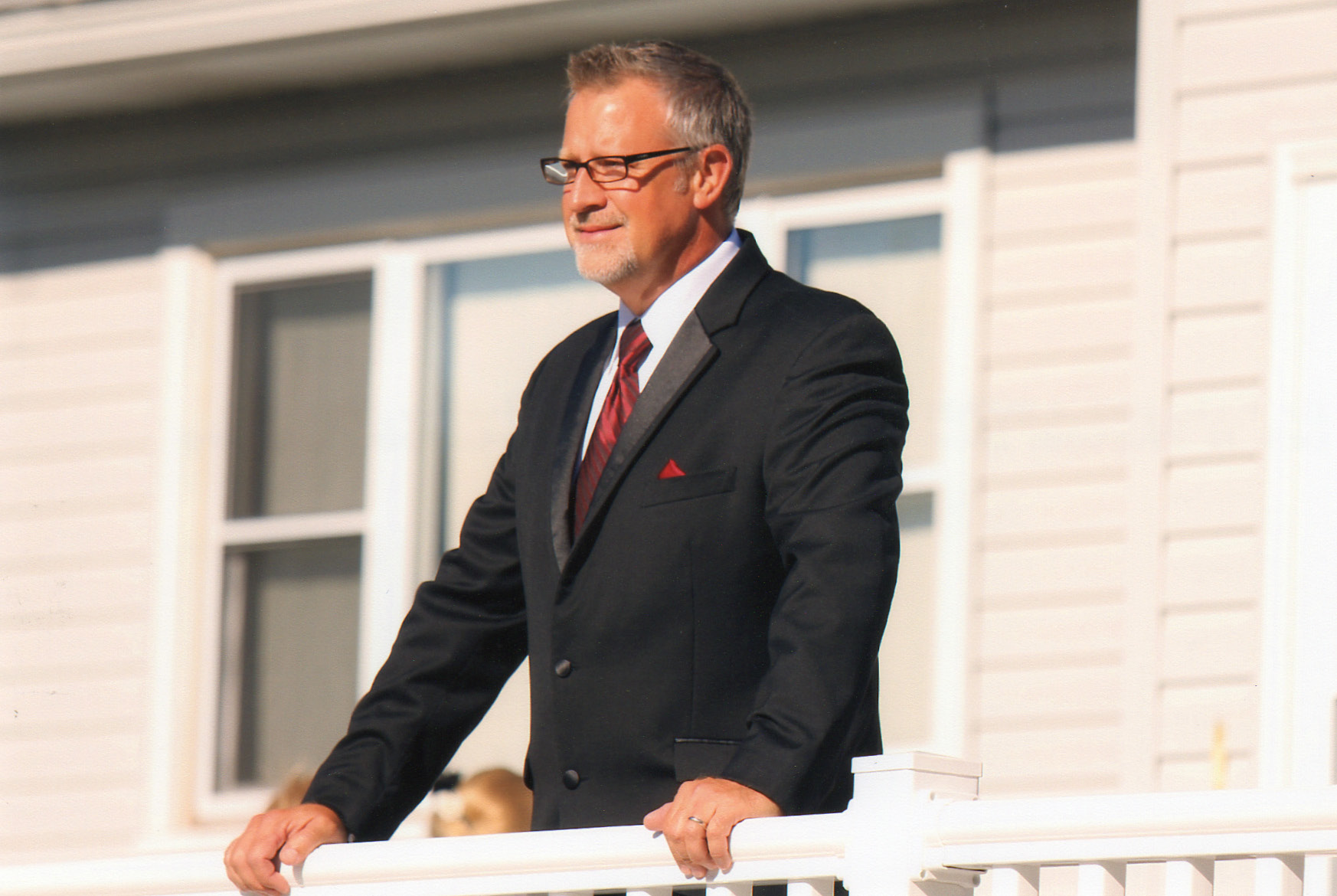
- Jensen in 2010
- Born: Doron Richard Jensen; September 1, 1958 (age 68); Dubuque, Iowa, US
- Occupation: Restaurateur
- Known for: Founding Timber Lodge Steakhouse and Old Country Buffet
- Parents: Bonnie L. Jensen; Richard A. Jensen

Doron Richard Jensen (born September 1, 1958) is an American restaurateur who was the principal founder of Timber Lodge Steakhouse, Homestyle Buffet, and Old Country Buffet.

== Early life ==
Doron Richard Jensen was born in Dubuque, Iowa, to pastors Richard and Bonnie Jensen. Jensen spent much of his formative youth in Addis Ababa, Ethiopia, before returning to the United States in 1965. He dropped out of a secondary school at the age of 16. Influenced by his grandfather's cafe, Jensen's Cafe, Jensen entered the restaurant business as a busboy. Jensen's parents were supportive of his endeavors from an early age. Jensen started his buffet career working as a manager at Sirloin Stockade and Ponderosa and Bonaza Steakhouse in Iowa in the 1970s. After the death of his grandfather, 20-year-old Doron felt ready to take over his grandfather's cafe in Fremont, Nebraska. His parents helped arrange the takeover of the restaurant, but was blocked by other relatives that thought he was too young for the responsibility. Jensen briefly attended the University of Minnesota.

== Old Country Buffet (1983–1986) ==
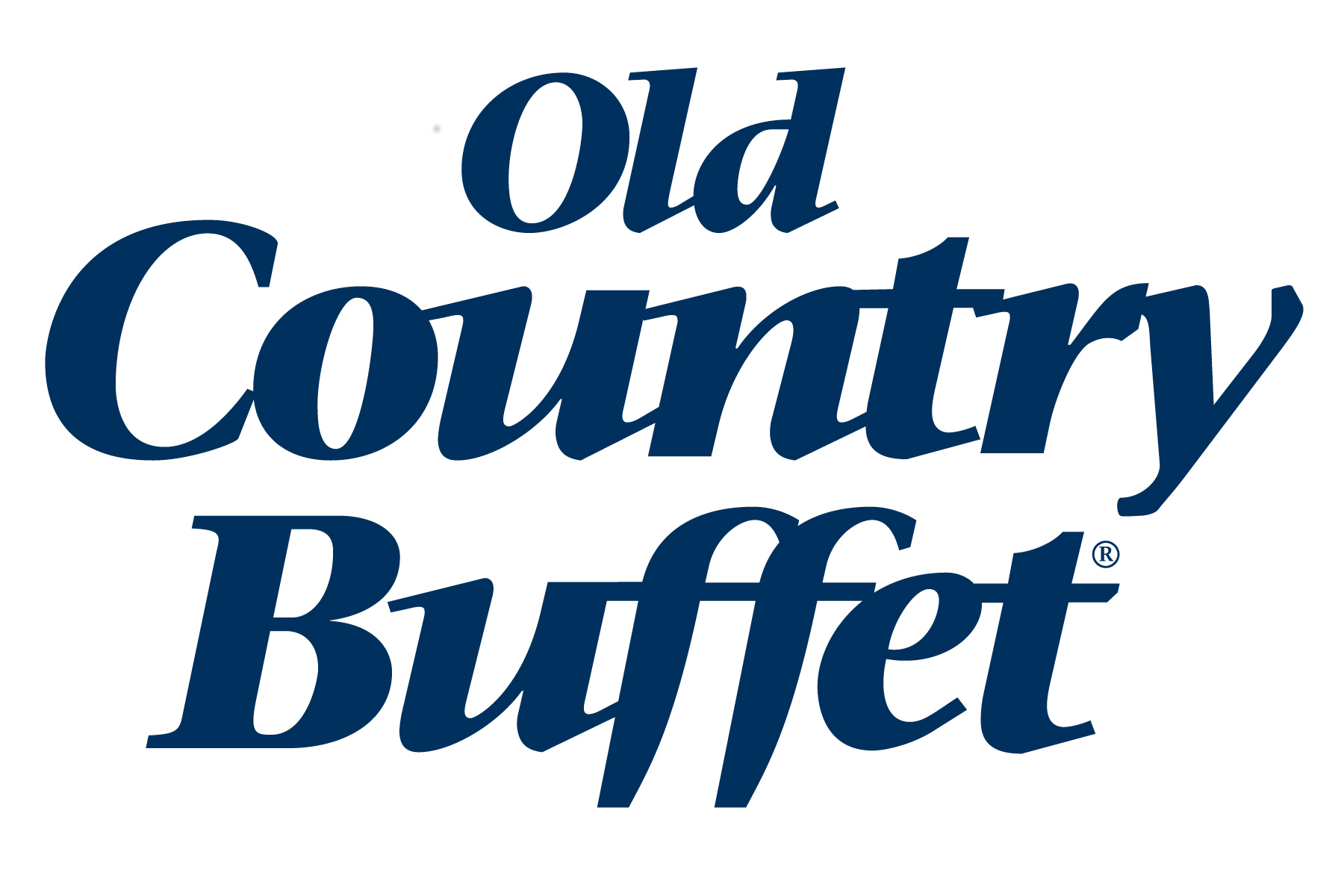
Jensen's restaurant chains included Old Country Buffet.

Jensen was brought into Old Country Buffet by Roe Hatlen and C. Dennis Scott in 1983. Jensen opened the first restaurant in St. Cloud, Minnesota, in 1983. In 1984, Jensen starting opening more locations in the Twin Cities Metropolitan area, eventually expanding its reach outside of Minnesota. Jensen began opening its restaurants along the eastern seaboard, but disagreements began among company leadership whether to expand into the American South. Disagreements within the company continued regarding southern United States expansion, and eventually led to Jensen and major investor and construction magnate Dermot Rowland to leave the company to start their own buffet chain, Homestyle Buffet. Shortly after Jensen's departure, Forbes recognized Old Country Buffett as one of the "200 best small companies in the United States" before becoming the largest buffet chain in the world posting revenues of $808.5 million and $868.9 million by the 1990s. Jensen cited his "youth and entrepreneurial spirit" as reasons why he left the company so early in its development.

== Homestyle Buffet (1986–1990) ==
Jensen left Old Country Buffet to lead what would become Homestyle Buffet. At just the age of 28, Jensen opened Homestyle Buffets Inc. and incorporated them in Clearwater, Florida, in 1986. He took the company public on December 1, 1988. Jensen expanded the reach of the company outside of Florida and across the eastern seaboard and eventually into New England. However, Jensen left the company after just 40 restaurants to return to the Midwest to pursue other ventures.

== Timberlodge Steakhouse (1991–1995) ==
While in Florida, Jensen was influenced by the developing steakhouse concept that would eventually become Outback Steakhouse. Jensen decided to return to Minneapolis, Minnesota, where he founded the company Q-Steaks Inc as the umbrella company for Minnesota Steakhouse in January 1991. Again, Jensen took his company public. Timber Lodge Steakhouse went public on January 1, 1993. Jensen changed the name to Timber Lodge Steakhouse in 1994 when the company's reach expanded outside of Minnesota, with the exception of Paul Bunyan's in New York. In 1995, he resigned as President of the company, again leaving a company that he had founded. Later, Jensen along with Outback Steakhouse founder, Chris T. Sullivan, would be attributed with rebooting the Q-steak American steakhouse concept.

== Later career ==
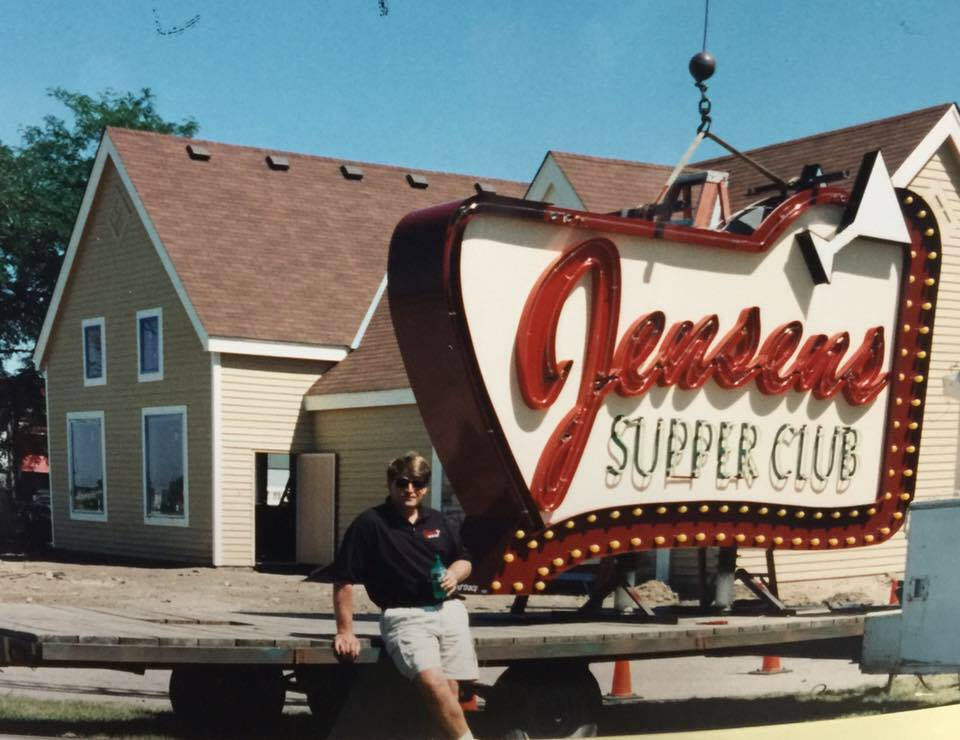
Jensen c. 1996 in Eagan, Minnesota. In the late 1990s, Jensen's career shifted towards a more signature style of restaurants.

Since Timber Lodge Steakhouse, Jensen has primarily focused on signature restaurants over large-scale restaurant chains. Jensen developed the signature restaurant Q-Cumbers in Edina, Minnesota, and later developed his own personal brand of self-titled restaurants Jensen's Cafe, Jensen's Supper Club, and Jensen's food & cocktails. Jensen's Cafe is named in honor of his grandfather's original Jensen's Cafe in Fremont, Nebraska.

Jensen's concepts and designs have been cited as influence for other restaurant brands such as Minervas food & cocktails and Hazelwood food & drinks.

Jensen was elected as the President of the interest group the Minnesota Restaurant Association in 2000. Jensen's career has also included lobbyist efforts representing the National Restaurant Association in Washington, DC. He has also served on various commerce boards in Minnesota.

== Personal life ==
Doron Jensen is the son of American theologian Richard A. Jensen and Bonnie L. Jensen. Jensen was also a relative of writer Moritz Thomsen and Mets Pitcher Noah Syndergaard. Jensen is the older brother of fellow restrauteur Derek Jensen. Jensen currently owns and operates a small collection of restaurants in the Twin Cities.
