= Franklin Foster Fry =

Lutheran minister in the late 1800s

Franklin Foster Fry (1 November 1864 − 13 December 1933) was a Lutheran minister. He was born in Carlisle, Pennsylvania on 1 November 1864; his mother was Eliza Jane Wattles, and his father, Jacob, was also a Lutheran minister. He attended Reading High School in Reading, Pennsylvania. He was educated at Muhlenberg College and Mounty Airy Lutheran Theological Seminary in Philadelphia. He was ordained in 1888, and married his wife, Minnie C. McKeown, on 14 June 1898. He was a minister at Grace Lutheran Church, Bethlehem, Pennsylvania from 1900 to 1901, and then moved to Rochester.

Dr. Fry was involved with the organization of the United Lutheran Church of America (ULCA), from its inception in New York in 1918. He was president of the Lutheran Synod of New York for a time, and also was president of the Rochester Federation of Churches. From 1927 until the time of his death he was secretary of the Board of American Missions of the ULCA.

He died of a heart attack on 13 December 1933. His children included Franklin C. Fry, also a prominent Lutheran.
