= Chuck Bradley (tight end) =

American football player (1950–2022)

No. 53, 88, 81
- Positions: Tight end, center

Personal information
- Born: October 13, 1950; Hinsdale, Illinois, U.S.
- Died: October 8, 2022 (aged 71)
- Listed height: 6 ft 6 in (1.98 m)
- Listed weight: 243 lb (110 kg)

Career information
- High school: Menlo-Atherton (Atherton, California)
- College: Oregon
- NFL draft: 1973: 2nd round, 52nd overall pick

Career history
- Miami Dolphins (1973); Southern California Sun (1974–1975); San Diego Chargers (1975–1977); Chicago Bears (1977)

Awards and highlights
- Super Bowl champion (VIII)
- Stats at Pro Football Reference

Charles John Bradley (October 13, 1950 – October 8, 2022) was an American professional football tight end who played three seasons in the National Football League (NFL) with the San Diego Chargers and Chicago Bears. He was selected by the Miami Dolphins in the second round of the 1973 NFL draft after playing college football at the University of Oregon. Bradley was also a member of the Southern California Sun of the World Football League (WFL).

== Early life and college ==
Charles John Bradley was born on October 13, 1950, in Hinsdale, Illinois. He attended Menlo-Atherton High School, in Atherton, California.

Bradley played college football for the Oregon Ducks of the University of Oregon. He caught 12 passes for 202 yards and one touchdown in 1971 as a tight end. He converted to center in 1972. After the 1972 season, Bradley was invited to play in the Senior Bowl and the East–West Shrine Game.

== Professional career ==
Bradley was selected by the Miami Dolphins in the second round, with the 52nd overall pick, of the 1973 NFL draft as a guard and center. He never played for the Dolphins. He was injured during the 1973 preseason and placed on injured reserve and then waived by the Dolphins before the 1974 season.

Bradley signed with the Southern California Sun of the World Football League (WFL) on September 17, 1974. He played in nine games for the Sun as a center during the 1974 season. He re-signed with the team on June 12, 1975. Bradley appeared in 12 games as a tight end during the 1975 WFL season, catching 27 passes for 459 yards and one touchdown.

Bradley was signed by the San Diego Chargers on November 26, 1975. He played in four games at tight end during the 1975 NFL season and caught one pass for 42 yards. He played in seven games for the Chargers in 1976 and recorded one reception for seven yards. Bradley played in one game for San Diego in 1977 before being released on September 19, 1977.

Bradley signed with the Chicago Bears on September 28, 1977. He played in seven regular season games and one postseason game for the Bears during the 1977 season. He was released on August 27, 1978.

== Personal life ==
Bradley graduated from Portland State University with a master's degree. He worked as a special education teacher and also started a custom home building company. He died on October 8, 2022, at age 71.
