= Association of Evangelical Lutheran Churches =

Defunct Christian denomination in the United States

- Abbreviation: AELC
- Classification: Lutheran
- Associations: Lutheran Council in the United States of America
- Region: United States
- Origin: December 1976
- Separated from: Lutheran Church–Missouri Synod
- Merged into: Evangelical Lutheran Church in America (1988)
- Congregations: 250 (1986)
- Members: 103,263 (1986)
- Ministers: 672 (1986)

The Association of Evangelical Lutheran Churches (AELC) was a U.S. church body that existed from 1976 through the end of 1987. The AELC formed when approximately 250 dissident congregations withdrew from the Lutheran Church–Missouri Synod (LCMS) in 1976, and ended as an independent body when it became part of the new Evangelical Lutheran Church in America (ELCA) on January 1, 1988.

In 1986, just before its merger into the ELCA, the AELC had 672 pastors, 250 congregations, and 103,263 members.

== Formation ==
The AELC's forerunner was Evangelical Lutherans in Mission (ELIM), a liberal caucus within the LCMS that opposed that body's more conservative turn in the early and mid-1970s. ELIM was formed when, in the wake of conservative victories at the 1973 convention of the LCMS, more liberal opponents had convened a conference in Chicago to chart out strategies. The conference's 800 delegates promised moral and financial support for church members who faced pressure due to their opposition to LCMS convention actions, and established ELIM as a network and rallying point for the moderate wing of the LCMS.

In 1974, the LCMS was rent by the Seminex controversy, a walk-out by most of the students and faculty of Concordia Seminary in St. Louis, Missouri, that led to the establishment of a rival "Seminary in Exile". In 1975, presidents of eight LCMS districts were threatened with removal from office for allowing their congregations to ordain Seminex graduates who had not been certified by Concordia Seminary, and four were removed in April 1976. In the wake of the Seminex controversy and those removals, a movement to leave the LCMS took shape among dissident congregations and church officials, most of them members of ELIM. The largest number of departures came from the LCMS's non-geographical English District, which had been formed when English Synod had joined the LCMS in 1911. The departing English District leadership and congregations immediately reconstituted the pre-1911 English Synod, and a number of officials and congregations from other districts followed their lead by exiting the LCMS.

In the end, approximately 250 congregations left the LCMS. In December 1976, these congregations established the Association of Evangelical Lutheran Churches (AELC). The AELC was a disappointment in some respects, since it garnered far fewer dissident LCMS congregations than its leaders had initially expected. With congregations totaling about 100,000 members, the AELC included less than 4% of the 2.7 million members of LCMS.

In October 1977, the AELC ordained its first female minister, Janith Otte Murphy of Oakland, California. Murphy subsequently took an associate pastor's position at the University Lutheran Chapel in Berkeley, California. The AELC was the third U.S. Lutheran church body to ordain a woman as a minister, following similar moves by the American Lutheran Church (ALC) and the Lutheran Church in America (LCA) in 1970.

The Rev. Will L. Herzfeld, an associate of Martin Luther King Jr. and former president of the Southern Christian Leadership Conference's Alabama chapter, served as the AELC's second and last presiding bishop. He was the first African American to lead a U.S. Lutheran church body.

== Merger ==
The AELC played an important role in efforts toward Lutheran unity in the United States. The AELC's leaders, Seminex president John Tietjen among them, served as the catalyst for merger talks with the American Lutheran Church (formed in 1960, with approximately 2.25 million members), and the Lutheran Church in America (formed in 1962, with approximately 2.85 million members). The effort drew on the expertise of C. Thomas ("Tom") Spitz, the executive director of the Lutheran Council in the United States of America, a coordinating advisory organization for the LCMS, ALC, and LCA, who had authored "A Call for Lutheran Union" in 1978. These two churches, both also more moderate than the LCMS, with the LCA more historically liberal, finally agreed with the AELC in 1982 to unite as one church. The three bodies officially completed their merger on January 1, 1988, thereby creating the current Evangelical Lutheran Church in America (ELCA), which at that time encompassed two-thirds of American Lutherans.

== Presidents/Presiding Bishops ==
- William Kohn (1976–1984)
- Will L. Herzfeld (1984–1987)

The designation used for the AELC leader was initially "president" and the title was later changed to "presiding bishop".
