= Wartburg Theological Seminary =

Lutheran seminary in Dubuque, Iowa, United States

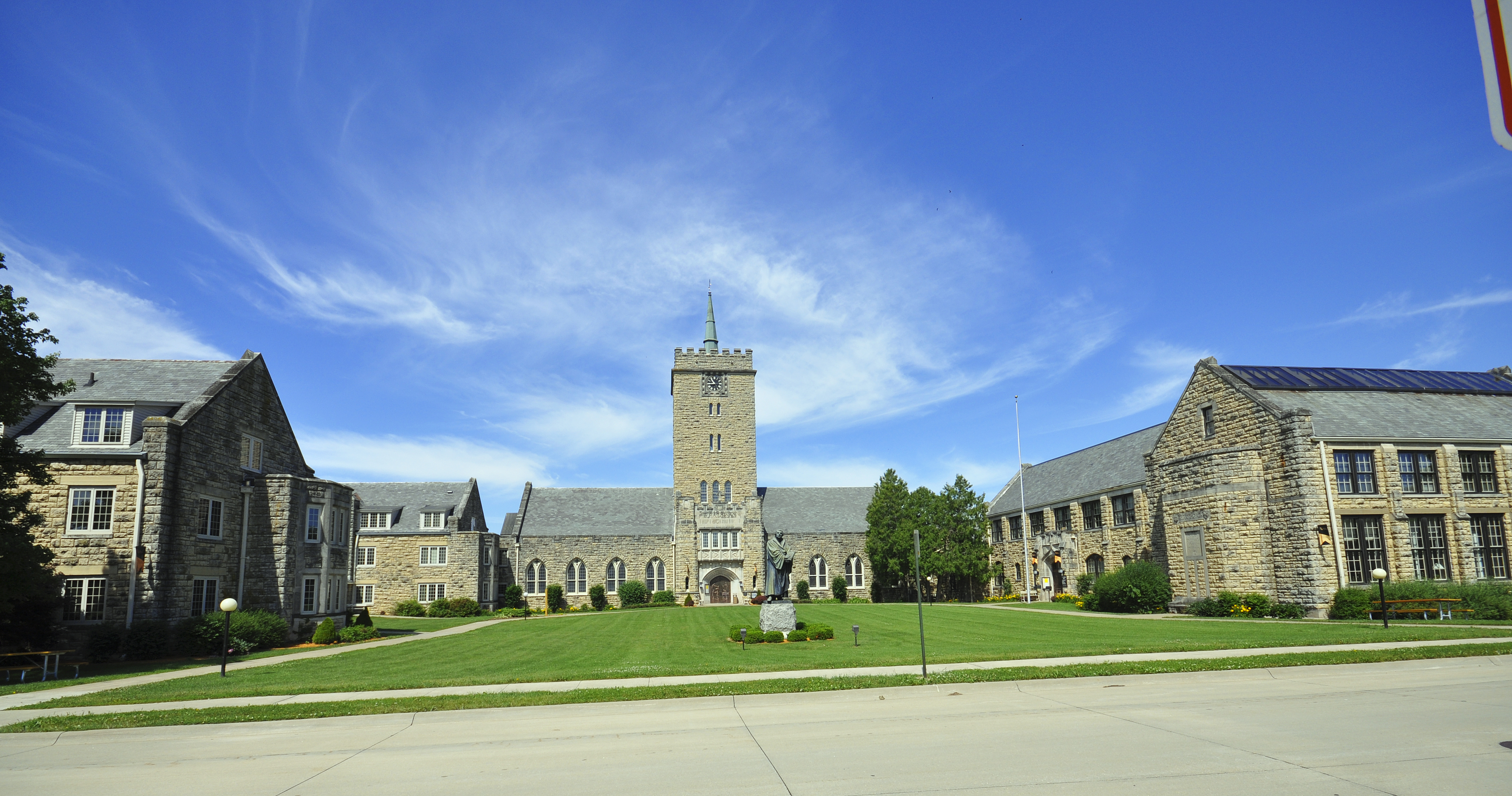
- Type: Seminary
- Established: 1854
- Religious affiliation: Evangelical Lutheran Church in America
- Endowment: $37.6 million (2021)
- President: Kristin Johnston Largen
- Faculty: 16
- Students: 193
- Location: Dubuque, Iowa, United States; 42.485424°N 90.690724°W
- Website: wartburgseminary.edu

Wartburg Theological Seminary is a seminary of the Evangelical Lutheran Church in America in Dubuque, Iowa. It offers three graduate-level degrees (MA, MA Diaconal Ministry, and M.Div.), a Theological Education for Emerging Ministries certificate, and a diploma in Anglican Studies, all of which are accredited by the Association of Theological Schools in the United States and Canada and the Higher Learning Commission. Students can also choose to add two concentrations: Youth, Culture, and Mission; and Hispanic Ministry.

All three of Wartburg Theological Seminary's master's degrees offer the option for Distributed Learning Programs, which combine online learning, intensive courses on-campus, and residential formation. Wartburg also offers a Fully Distributed Master of Arts option without a semester-long residency requirement.

Three academic and missional centers are found at Wartburg Theological Seminary, built on their historic strengths: the Center for Global Theologies, the Center for Theology & Land (rural ministry), and the Center for Youth Ministries.

The Lutheran Seminary Program in the Southwest is a program of Wartburg and the Lutheran School of Theology at Chicago. The program educates women and men for ordained ministry through the Theological Education for Emerging Ministry.

Wartburg Theological Seminary also has long-term ties with global partners, including Haiti, Tanzania, Guyana, Namibia, Papua New Guinea (with the PNG Museum located on campus), and others.

Wartburg is a Reconciling in Christ seminary.

== See also ==
- Wartburg Castle - the inspiration for Wartburg Seminary's architecture
- Johann Konrad Wilhelm Löhe - founder of Wartburg Seminary
- Richard A. Jensen - professor at Wartburg Seminary
