= Charles H. Bradley Jr. =

American businessman (1899–1972)

Charles Harvey Bradley Jr. (April 20, 1899 – September 1, 1972) was an American businessman.

== Biography ==
He was the fourth and youngest child of Charles H. Bradley Sr. of Dubuque, Iowa, a founder of Bradley Brothers Cigars which made the famous Baroness and Bradley brands of cigars, and Katherine Elderkin Wetherbee Bradley of Wabasha, Minnesota.

After attending grade school in Dubuque, Charles Harvey Bradley (“Harve”) entered Thacher Preparatory School in Ojai Valley, California in 1912. In 1915 he transferred to Phillips Academy, Andover, Massachusetts. After graduating from Andover in 1917 he entered Yale College, New Haven, Connecticut in the fall of that year. On the advice of then Colonel Theodore Roosevelt he and six close friends from Yale, one being Roosevelt's nephew, Sheffield Cowles, left the college after mid year exams and enlisted in the Marine Corps in February 1918.

After training at Parris Island, SC, and earning the designation of Sharpshooter, Harve became a Private in the 80th Company, 6th Regiment, Second Marines. He fought in France in the battles of Belleau Wood, Château-Thierry and was wounded for the second time on July 19, 1918, in the battle of Soissons. Here, his left hip was shattered by shrapnel. After lying on the battle field for nearly 18 hours, he was rescued and spent two months recovering at Base Hospital 27 in Angers, France, before returning to a hospital in Portsmouth, Virginia. His entire division was decorated for bravery by the French government.

Harve reentered Yale in the middle of 1919. In spite of his war injury, he was on the 150-pound Yale Crew. He was a member of Delta Kappa Epsilon and was elected to Skull and Bones. He graduated with the class of 1921 with an A.B. degree.

During the summer of 1919 while visiting Culver, Indiana, he met Carolyn Coffin of Indianapolis, daughter of Charles E Coffin, prominent real estate developer and banker, whom he married in January 1922. They spent a two-month honeymoon in Europe, during which they visited the French battlefields where he had fought.

After his marriage, Harve moved to Indianapolis and worked first for the Fletcher Trust Company until 1924 serving as cashier of the Sixteenth Street Branch Bank, a subsidiary of the Fletcher Trust Company.

In 1924 he was employed by W.J. Holiday & Company, Steel Distributors. He became secretary, treasurer of the company in 1927 and president in 1932. He was also president of Monarch Steel Company, cold drawers of steel bars, a subsidiary of W.J. Holiday & Company.

Soon after the United States entered World War II, Harve was appointed chief of the Steel Recovery Program. Materials Branch, Steel Division War Production Board and moved to Pittsburgh in July 1942. He set the pattern and directed the course of that branch for eight months, returning to Indianapolis in 1943. He was appointed the Civilian Defense Director for Indianapolis and served in that capacity for six months.

Harve remained president of W.J. Holiday & Company until the company was sold to Jones and Laughlin Steel Company in 1954. He served as chairman of the advisory board in the warehouse division from 1955 to 1960. . He became president of the Shorewood Corporation in 1960, but left in 1962 to become chairman of the executive committee and vice chairman of the board of directors of P.R. Mallory & Co., Inc. In 1964 he became chairman of the board of this company.

During his career, he was also a director of P.R. Mallory International, the Ransburg Electrocoating Corporation, the Jones & Laughlin Steel Corporation, the Indiana National Bank, Bell Telephone Company, the Indiana Gas & Water Company, Monarch Steel Company, Employers Association of Indiana, and American Steel Warehouse Association (chairman of the executive committee). He was also on the board of directors of the Illinois Central Industries and the Illinois Central Railroad. Bradley was a President of the Indiana Chamber of Commerce and the United Fund.

During his lifetime his memberships included: Yale Alumni Board, Redevelopment Commission of Indiana, State and National American Legion, Navy league, Service Club of Indianapolis, University Club of Indianapolis, Columbia Club, Indianapolis Athletic Club, Woodstock Country Club, Draft Board of Appeals, N.R.A. Labor Board. He was a founder of the Service Club, composed of U.S. Marine Corps veterans of World Wars I and II.

His hobbies included golf and photography. He long maintained his own dark room and enjoyed taking and developing his own photographs. For many years he piloted his own single-engine planes beginning with a Navion and ending with a Beechcraft Bonanza which he owned at the time of his death. He was a member of the Sportsman's Pilot Association and the Quiet Birdmen, also a flying association.

He never lost his love of horse back riding and the West which he had developed as a schoolboy in Ojai, California.

During their fifty-year marriage, he and his wife had three children and seven grandchildren.

Charles Harvey Bradley died of a sudden massive heart attack in Indianapolis at the age of 73.
