= American Lutheran Church =

Defunct Christian denomination in the United States

- Classification: Protestant
- Orientation: Lutheran
- Structure: National church, middle level synods, and local congregations
- Associations: Lutheran World Federation; Lutheran Council in the United States of America
- Region: United States and Canada
- Headquarters: Minneapolis, Minnesota
- Origin: 1960; Minneapolis, Minnesota
- Merger of: first American Lutheran Church; The Evangelical Lutheran Church; United Evangelical Lutheran Church
- Absorbed: Lutheran Free Church (1963)
- Separations: Evangelical Lutheran Church of Canada (1966); American Association of Lutheran Churches (1987)
- Merged into: Evangelical Lutheran Church in America (1988)
- Congregations: 4,959 (1986)
- Members: 2,319,443 (1986)
- Ministers: 7,671 (1986)
- Publications: Lutheran Standard

The American Lutheran Church (ALC) was a Christian Protestant denomination in the United States and Canada that existed from 1960 to 1987. Its headquarters were in Minneapolis, Minnesota. Upon its formation in 1960, the ALC designated Augsburg Publishing House, also located in Minneapolis, as the church publisher. The Lutheran Standard was the official magazine of The ALC.

The ALC's immigrant heritage came mostly from Germany, Norway, and Denmark, and its demographic center was in the Upper Midwest (with especially large numbers in Minnesota). Theologically, the church was influenced by pietism. It was slightly more conservative than the Lutheran Church in America (LCA), with which it would eventually merge. While officially it taught biblical inerrancy in its constitution, this was seldom enforced by such means as heresy trials.

The ALC was a founding member of the "Lutheran Council in the United States of America", which began on January 1, 1967. The ALC cooperated with the Lutheran Church–Missouri Synod in many ventures, but the ties came to an end when talks concerning a merger of The ALC with the Lutheran Church in America began.

After six years, in 1966, Western Canadian congregations of the ALC formed the autonomous Evangelical Lutheran Church of Canada (ELCC), which in 1986 joined with the ALC's Eastern Canadian congregations and the Lutheran Church in America – Canada Section (LCA-CS) (former LCA congregations in separate regional synods in Canada) to form the Evangelical Lutheran Church in Canada (ELCIC).

== Formation ==
The American Lutheran Church was formed in 1960 out of the following Lutheran church bodies:

=== American Lutheran Church (1930–1960) ===
The first American Lutheran Church was formed in 1930 by a merger of the Evangelical Lutheran Synod of Iowa and Other States (est. 1854), the Lutheran Synod of Buffalo (est. 1845), and the Evangelical Lutheran Joint Synod of Ohio and Other States (established 1818 from Ministerium of Pennsylvania), with headquarters in Columbus, Ohio. After the merger of 1960, this body was informally referred to as the "old American Lutheran Church" or the "first American Lutheran Church" to distinguish it from the later body into which it had been absorbed. The merged body was named "The American Lutheran Church" (with "The" as part of the official title and therefore capitalized), which was abbreviated "TALC." Hence "ALC" designates the 1930-1960 body while "TALC" designates the 1960-1987 body.

=== Evangelical Lutheran Church ===
The Evangelical Lutheran Church, established in 1917 and known from its founding until 1946 as the Norwegian Lutheran Church of America (NLCA). The NLCA had itself been formed from a merger of the Hauge Synod (established 1876), the Norwegian Synod (established 1853), and the United Norwegian Lutheran Church of America (established 1890).

=== United Evangelical Lutheran Church ===
The United Evangelical Lutheran Church, founded in 1896, and known until 1946 as the United Danish Evangelical Lutheran Church. The UDELC had been formed from a merger of the Danish Evangelical Lutheran Church Association in America (the "Blair Church", established 1884) and the Danish Evangelical Lutheran Church in North America (the "North Church", established 1894).

== Lutheran Free Church ==
The Lutheran Free Church, which had broken away from the United Norwegian Lutheran Church in 1897, joined the ALC on February 1, 1963. Forty Lutheran Free Church congregations chose not to participate in the merger, and instead formed the Association of Free Lutheran Congregations, today the sixth-largest Lutheran denomination in the U.S. with over 250 congregations.

== Ordination of women ==
The ALC began ordaining women as ministers/pastors in December 1970, when the Rev. Barbara Andrews became the second woman ordained as a Lutheran minister in the United States. In 1970, a survey of 4,745 Lutheran adults by Strommen et al., found that 66% of ALC Lutherans surveyed agreed that women should be ordained, compared with 75% of LCA Lutherans and 45% of LCMS Lutherans. The first Native American woman to become a Lutheran minister in the United States, the Rev. Marlene Whiterabbit Helgemo, was ordained by the ALC in July 1987.

== ELCA Merger ==
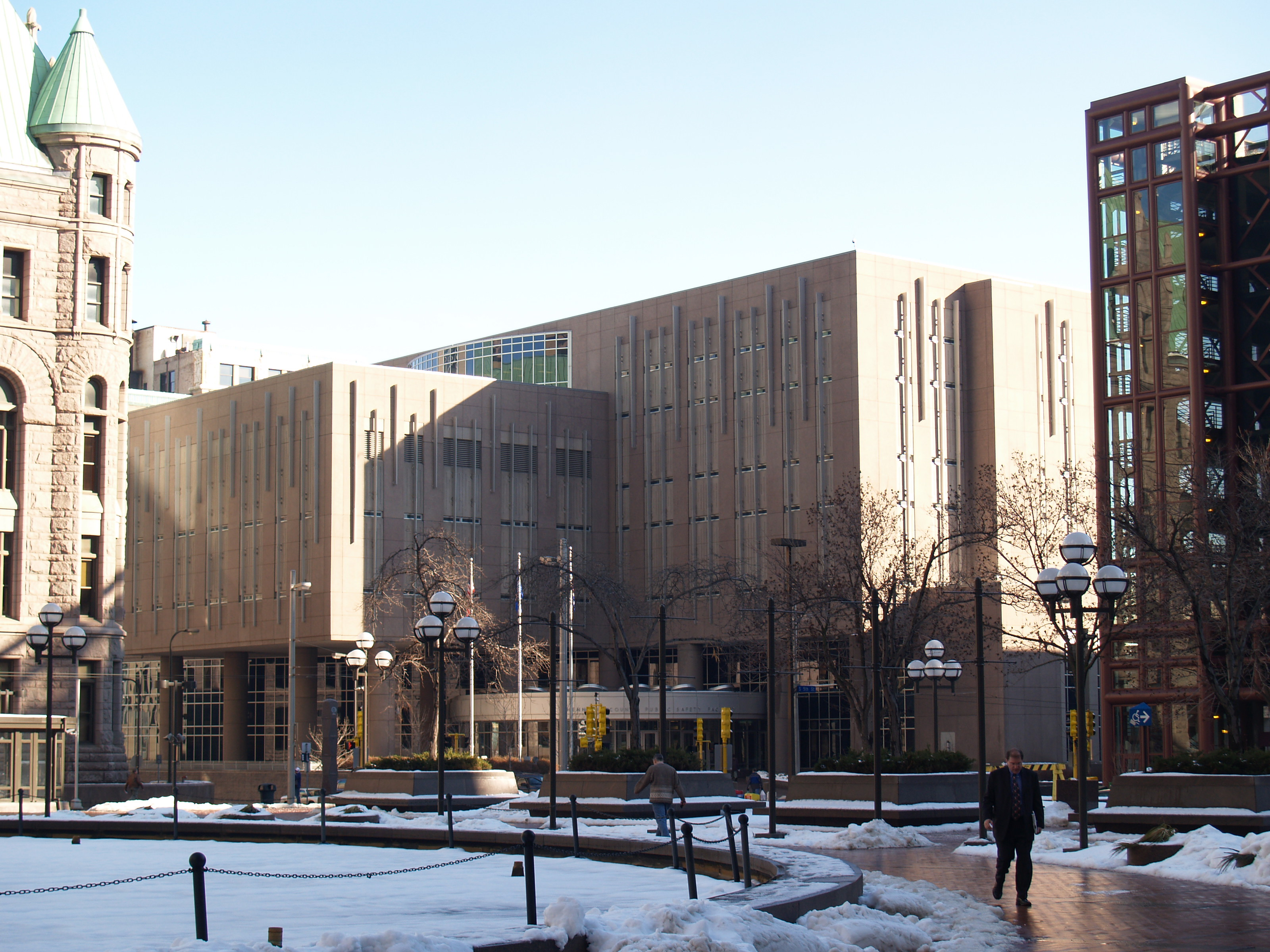
The site of The ALC's former headquarters on South Fifth Street in Minneapolis, Minnesota, now serves as the Hennepin County Jail. The site of the publishing arm of The ALC, Augsburg Publishing House, is adjacent

On January 1, 1988, the American Lutheran Church ceased to exist when it, along with the Lutheran Church in America and the Association of Evangelical Lutheran Churches, joined to form the Evangelical Lutheran Church in America with its new headquarters in the Lutheran Center on West Higgins Road in suburban Chicago, Illinois. At the time of the merger, the ALC was the third largest Lutheran church body in the United States, behind the Lutheran Church in America and Lutheran Church–Missouri Synod.

In 1986, just before its merger into the ELCA, the ALC had 7,671 pastors, 4,959 congregations, and 2,319,443 members. The ALC brought approximately 2.25 million members into the ELCA. Twelve conservative ALC congregations that did not want to participate in the merger formed the American Association of Lutheran Churches, which has since grown to 87 congregations.

== Presidents/presiding bishops ==
- 1960–1970 Fredrik A. Schiotz
- 1971–1973 Kent S. Knutson
- 1973–1987 David W. Preus

Use of the term presiding bishop as an alternative for the term general president was approved in 1980.

== Educational institutions ==
=== Colleges ===
- Augsburg University, Minneapolis, Minnesota
- Augustana University, Sioux Falls, South Dakota
- California Lutheran University, Thousand Oaks, California
- Capital University, Columbus, Ohio
- Concordia College, Moorhead, Minnesota
- Dana College, Blair, Nebraska
- Luther College, Decorah, Iowa
- Pacific Lutheran University, Parkland, Washington
- St. Olaf College, Northfield, Minnesota
- Texas Lutheran University, Seguin, Texas
- Wartburg College, Waverly, Iowa
- Waldorf Jr. College, Forest City, Iowa, now a four-year college

=== Seminaries ===
- The Evangelical Lutheran Theological Seminary, Columbus, Ohio (shared with LCA after 1978 due to its merger with the Hamma Divinity School of Wittenberg University)
- Luther Theological Seminary, Saint Paul, Minnesota (shared with the LCA after merger with Northwestern Theological Seminary in 1982)
- Wartburg Theological Seminary, Dubuque, Iowa
- Pacific Lutheran Theological Seminary, Berkeley, California (shared with the LCA)

== National General Conventions ==
- 1960 The ALC Constituting/General Convention, Minneapolis, Minnesota
- 1962 1st, Milwaukee, Wisconsin
- 1964 2nd, Columbus, Ohio
- 1966 3rd, Minneapolis, Minnesota
- 1968 4th, Omaha, Nebraska
- 1970 5th, San Antonio, Texas
- 1972 6th, Minneapolis, Minnesota
- 1974 7th, Detroit, Michigan
- 1976 8th, Washington, D.C.
- 1978 9th, Moorhead, Minnesota
- 1980 10th, Minneapolis, Minnesota
- 1982 11th, San Diego, California
- 1984 12th, Fargo, North Dakota and Moorhead, Minnesota
- 1986 13th, Minneapolis, Minnesota
- 1987 Closing convention, Columbus, Ohio
