= United Lutheran Seminary =

American Lutheran seminary in Pennsylvania, U.S.

- Type: Private seminary
- Established: 2017
- Religious affiliation: Evangelical Lutheran Church in America
- President: Guy Erwin
- Academic staff: 17
- Students: 326 total, 156 FTE
- Location: Philadelphia and Gettysburg, Pennsylvania, United States
- Website: unitedlutheranseminary.edu

United Lutheran Seminary is a seminary of the Evangelical Lutheran Church in America (ELCA) in Gettysburg and Philadelphia, Pennsylvania, United States. It is one of the seven seminaries of the church. It was created in 2017 when the Lutheran Theological Seminary at Gettysburg and the Lutheran Theological Seminary at Philadelphia consolidated.

== History ==
=== Lutheran Theological Seminary at Gettysburg ===
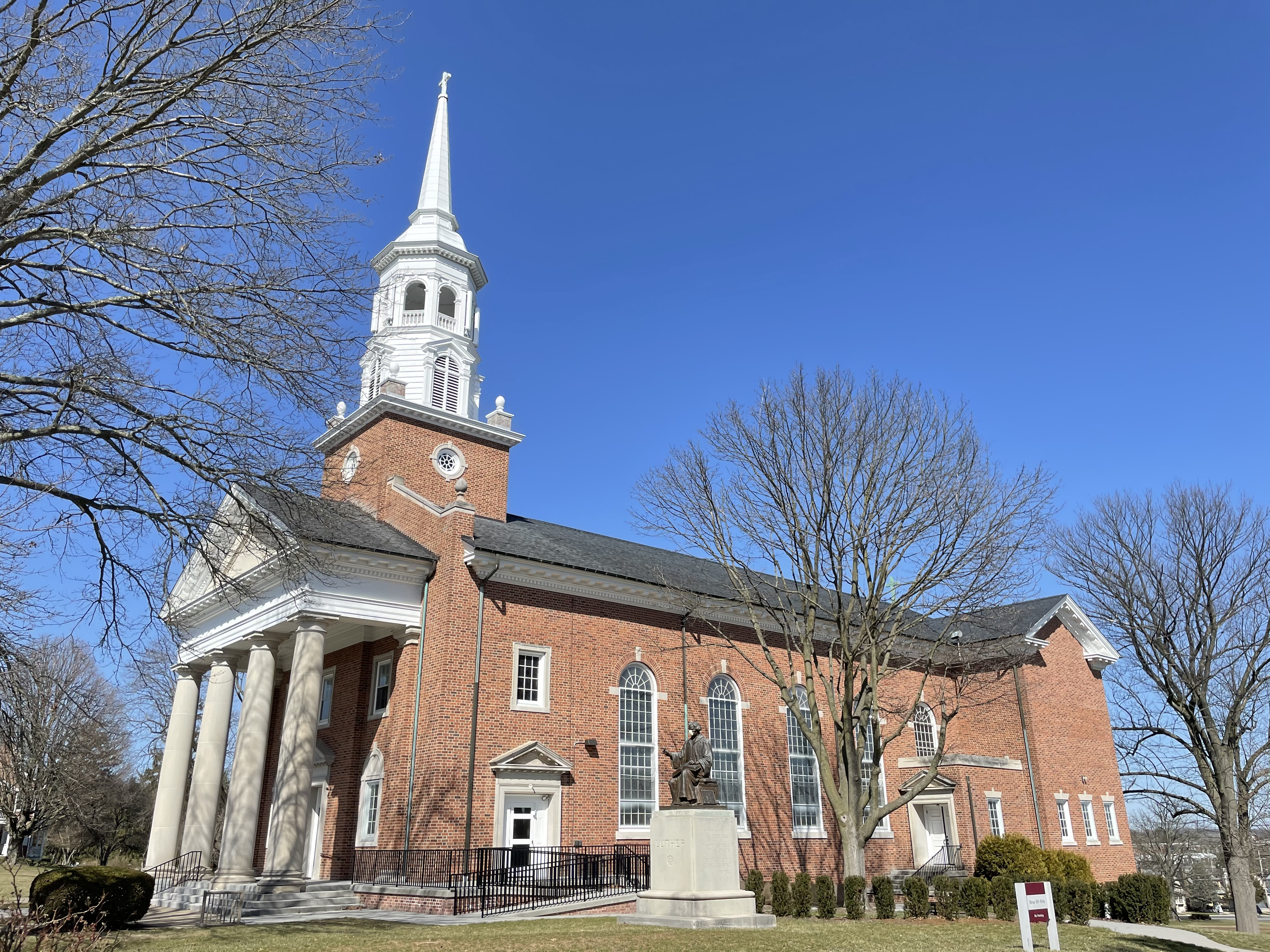
The Church of the Abiding Presence, the chapel of the United Lutheran Seminary-Gettysburg.

On September 5, 1826, what is now the oldest Lutheran seminary in the Americas held its first classes with eight students in the small borough of Gettysburg. In 1832, the seminary relocated to Seminary Ridge overlooking Gettysburg, becoming the Lutheran Theological Seminary at Gettysburg.

In July 1863, the seminary's premises and environs became the stage for the Battle of Gettysburg. Schmucker Hall. the original seminary building, is today a museum dedicated to the battle that took place there, the role of faith in freedom in nineteenth century America, and also Civil War medical practices. Schmucker Hall was the largest fixed field hospital at Gettysburg.

=== Lutheran Theological Seminary at Philadelphia ===
Founded by the Ministerium of Pennsylvania in 1864 to preserve both Lutheran identity and the study of and instruction in the German language, the Lutheran Theological Seminary at Philadelphia was first located in the Center City District. It relocated to Mount Airy in 1889, a historic site where the first shots of the American Revolution's Battle of Germantown had been fired a century before.

=== Consolidation ===
The current school was founded on July 1, 2017, as a consolidation of the Lutheran Theological Seminary at Gettysburg and the Lutheran Theological Seminary at Philadelphia. United Lutheran Seminary continues under the charter of Lutheran Theological Seminary at Gettysburg.

The first president of the seminary, Theresa F. Latini, a Presbyterian, was announced on April 20, 2017. Latini's previous experience working for OneByOne, an organization that performed "gay conversion", caused significant controversy and she was fired on March 14, 2018. Her departure prompted allegations of institutional racism from some students and alumni. On May 16, 2018, the seminary board announced the selection of Richard Green as interim president, beginning June 1. After Green left the institution in late November 2019, Angela Zimmann, who was then the seminary's Vice President of Advancement, served as acting president until the arrival of President Erwin in August 2020.

On June 9, 2020, the seminary board announced the election of R. Guy Erwin as president. Erwin was previously bishop of the Southwest California Synod of the ELCA. He is the first Native American bishop and the first openly gay bishop of that church body.

== Campuses ==
The Gettysburg campus is mostly in the Gettysburg borough limits, though it has portions in Cumberland Township.

== Accreditation ==
United Lutheran Seminary is accredited by the Commission on Accrediting of the Association of Theological Schools in the United States and Canada and the Middle States Commission on Higher Education.

The following degree programs are approved:

- Masters of Divinity (MDiv)
- Master of Arts in Ministerial Leadership
- Master of Arts in Public Leadership
- Master of Sacred Theology (STM)
- Doctor of Ministry (Dmin)
- Doctor of Philosophy (PhD)

== Notable faculty ==
- Paul Rajashekar (retired)

== Notable affiliations ==
In 1835, Lutheran Theological Seminary at Gettysburg welcomed one of the first African Americans to study theology in America, Daniel Alexander Payne, who later became a bishop in the African Methodist Episcopal Church and the first president of Wilberforce University under AME auspices.

A century after its early integration, Gettysburg was also the first among American Lutheran seminaries to grant tenure to a female professor, Bertha Paulssen. Graduating in 1965 was Elizabeth Platz, the first woman to be ordained (in 1970) by a U.S. Lutheran body.

Following his graduation from the Philadelphia seminary, Franklin Clark Fry was elected to the presidency of the United Lutheran Church, the Lutheran World Federation, and the World Council of Churches. On April 7, 1958, Fry was featured on the cover of TIME.
