= Grounds of the University of Virginia =

College campus in Charlottesville, Virginia, US

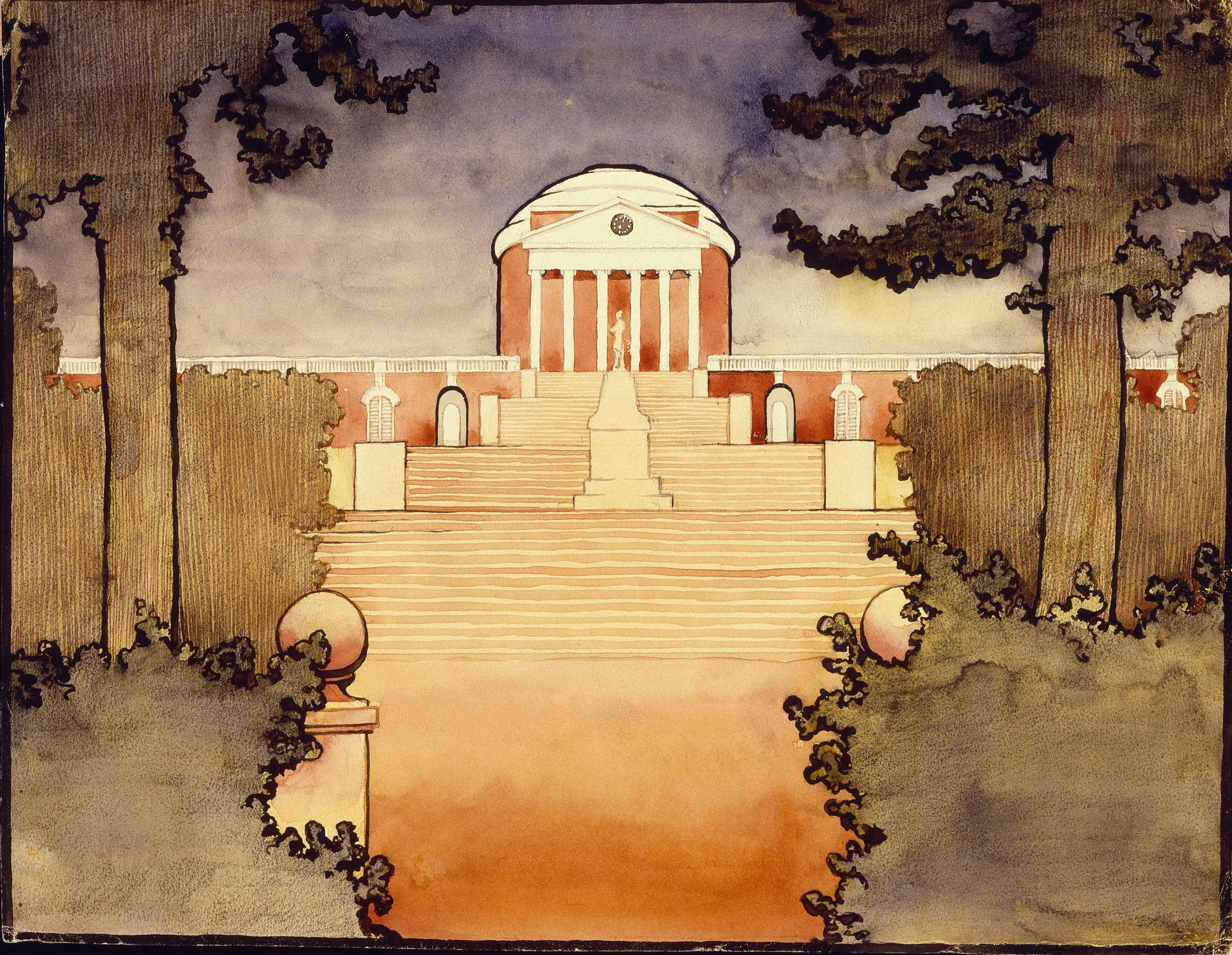
The Rotunda, as painted by American modernist painter Georgia O'Keeffe in the early 1910s when she was a Summer Session student

The University of Virginia campus, referred to as Grounds, straddles the border between the City of Charlottesville and Albemarle County. The university also maintains 562 acres north of the campus at North Fork and 2,913 acres southeast of the city at Morven Farm. It also is in the process of building a campus in Northern Virginia within Fairfax, Virginia.

== Academical Village ==
Throughout its history, the University of Virginia has won praise for its unique Jeffersonian architecture. In January 1895, less than a year before the Great Rotunda Fire, The New York Times said the design of the University of Virginia "was incomparably the most ambitious and monumental architectural project that had or has yet been conceived in this century." In the United States Bicentennial issue of their AIA Journal, the American Institute of Architects called it "the proudest achievement of American architecture in the past 200 years." The Academical Village, together with Jefferson's home at Monticello, which he also designed, is a World Heritage Site. The first collegiate architecture and culture World Heritage Site in the world, it was listed by UNESCO in 1987.

Jefferson's original architectural design revolves around the Academical Village, and that name remains in use today to describe both the specific area of the Lawn, a grand, terraced green space surrounded by residential and academic buildings, the gardens, the Range, and the larger university surrounding it. The principal building of the design, the Rotunda, stands at the north end of the Lawn, and is the most recognizable symbol of the university. It is half the height and width of the Pantheon in Rome, which was the primary inspiration for the building. The Lawn and the Rotunda were the models for many similar designs of "centralized green areas" at universities across the country. The space was designed for students and professors to live in the same area. The Rotunda, which symbolized knowledge, showed hierarchy. The south end of the Lawn was left open to symbolize the view of cultivated fields to the south, as reflective of Jefferson's ideal for an agrarian-focused nation.

Most notably designed by inspiration of the Rotunda and Lawn are the expansive green spaces headed by similar buildings built at Duke University in 1892; Columbia University in 1895; Johns Hopkins University in 1902; Carnegie Mellon University in 1904; Rice University in 1910; Peabody College of Vanderbilt University in 1915; Killian Court at MIT in 1916; the Grand Auditorium of Tsinghua University built in 1917 in Beijing, China; the Sterling Quad of Yale Divinity School in 1932; and the university's own Darden School in 1996.

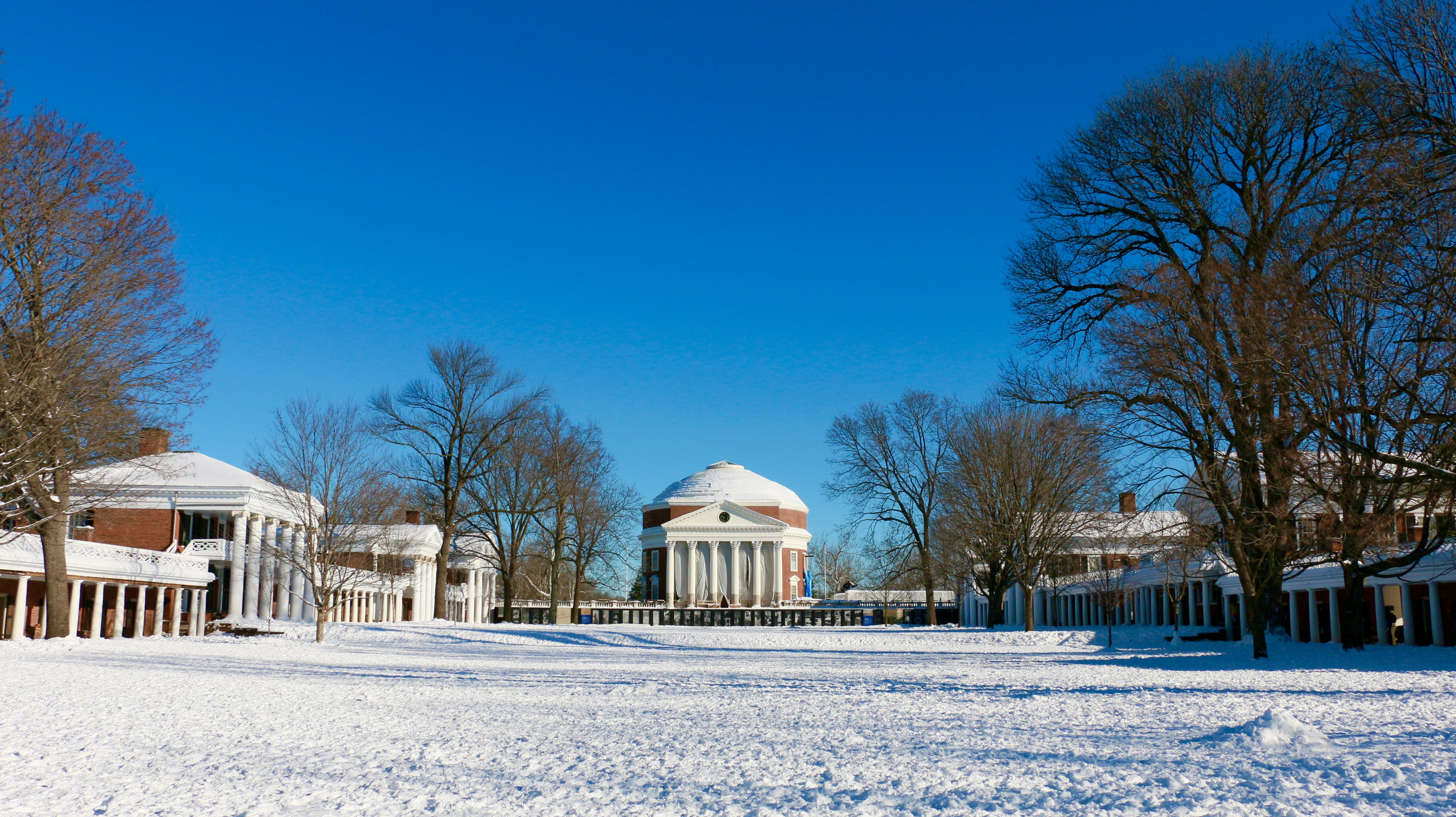
Winter view toward the Rotunda (under renovation)

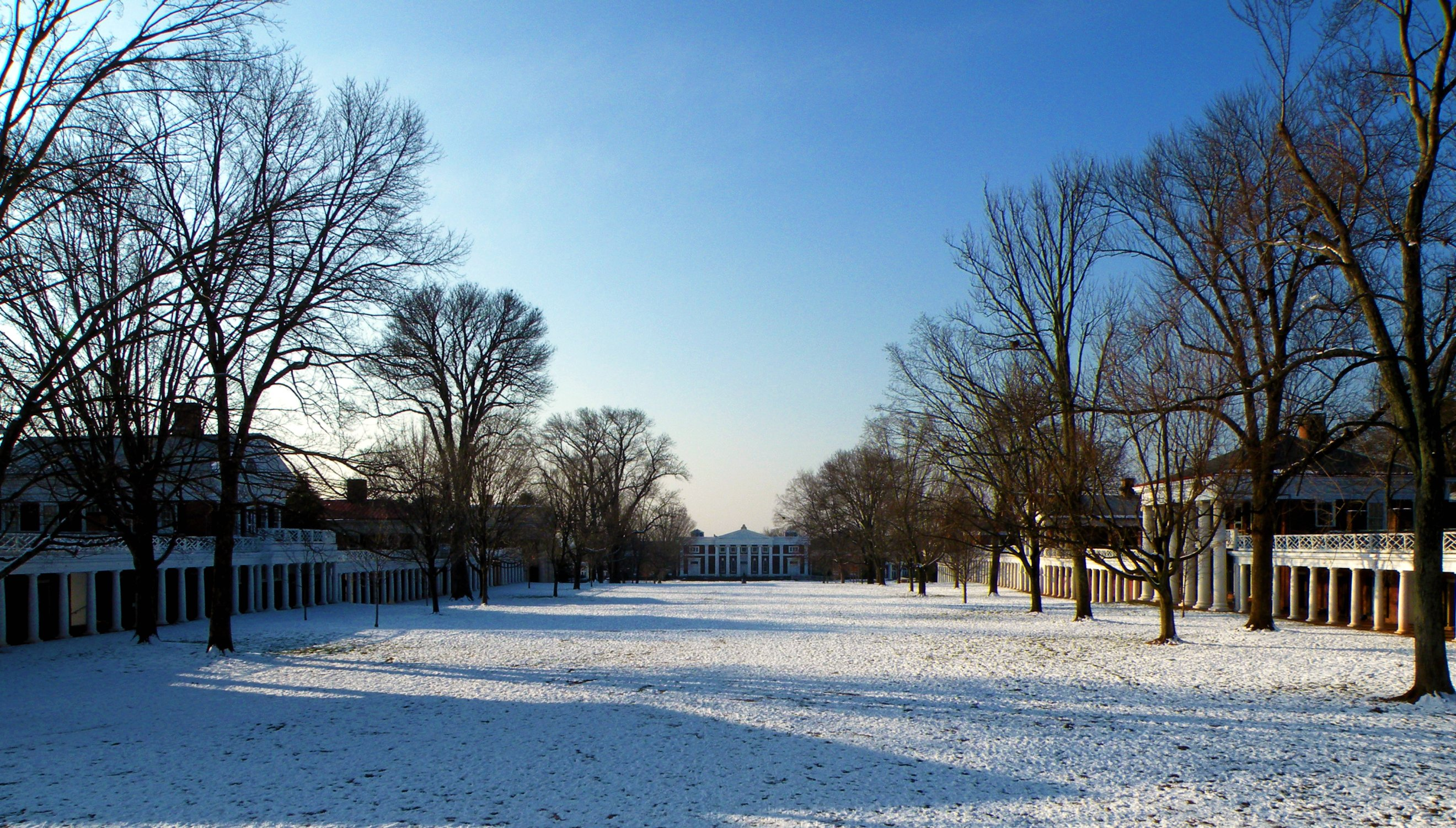
Winter view toward the South Lawn

Flanking both sides of the Rotunda and extending down the length of the Lawn are ten Pavilions interspersed with student housing rooms. Each has its own classical architectural style, as well as its own walled garden separated by Jeffersonian Serpentine walls. These walls are called "serpentine" because they run a sinusoidal course, one that lends strength to the wall and allows for the wall to be only one brick thick, one of many innovations by which Jefferson attempted to combine aesthetics with utility.

On October 27, 1895, the Rotunda burned to a shell because of an electrical fire that started in the Rotunda Annex, a long multi-story structure built in 1853 to house additional classrooms. The electrical fire was no doubt assisted by the help of overzealous faculty member William "Reddy" Echols, who attempted to save it by throwing roughly 100 pounds (45 kg) of dynamite into the main fire in the hopes the blast would separate the burning Annex from Jefferson's own Rotunda. His last-ditch effort ultimately failed. Perhaps ironically, one of the university's main honors student programs is named for him. University officials swiftly approached celebrity architect Stanford White to rebuild the Rotunda. White took the charge further, disregarding Jefferson's design and redesigning the Rotunda interior—making it two floors instead of three, adding three buildings to the foot of the Lawn, and designing a president's house. He did omit rebuilding the Rotunda Annex, the remnants of which were used as fill and to create part of the modern-day Rotunda's northern-facing plaza. The classes formerly occupying the Annex were moved to the South Lawn in White's new buildings.

The White buildings have the effect of closing off the sweeping perspective, as originally conceived by Jefferson, down the Lawn across open countryside toward the distant mountains. The White buildings at the foot of the Lawn effectively create a huge "quadrangle", albeit one far grander than any traditional college quadrangle at the University of Cambridge or University of Oxford.

In concert with the United States Bicentennial in 1976, Stanford White's changes to the Rotunda were removed and the building was returned to Jefferson's original design. Renovated according to original sketches and historical photographs, a three-story Rotunda opened on Jefferson's birthday, April 13, 1976. Queen Elizabeth II came to visit the Rotunda in that same year for the Bicentennial and had a well-publicized stroll of the Lawn. The university was listed by Travel + Leisure in September 2011 as one of the most beautiful campuses in the United States and by MSN as one of the most beautiful college campuses in the world.

== Libraries ==
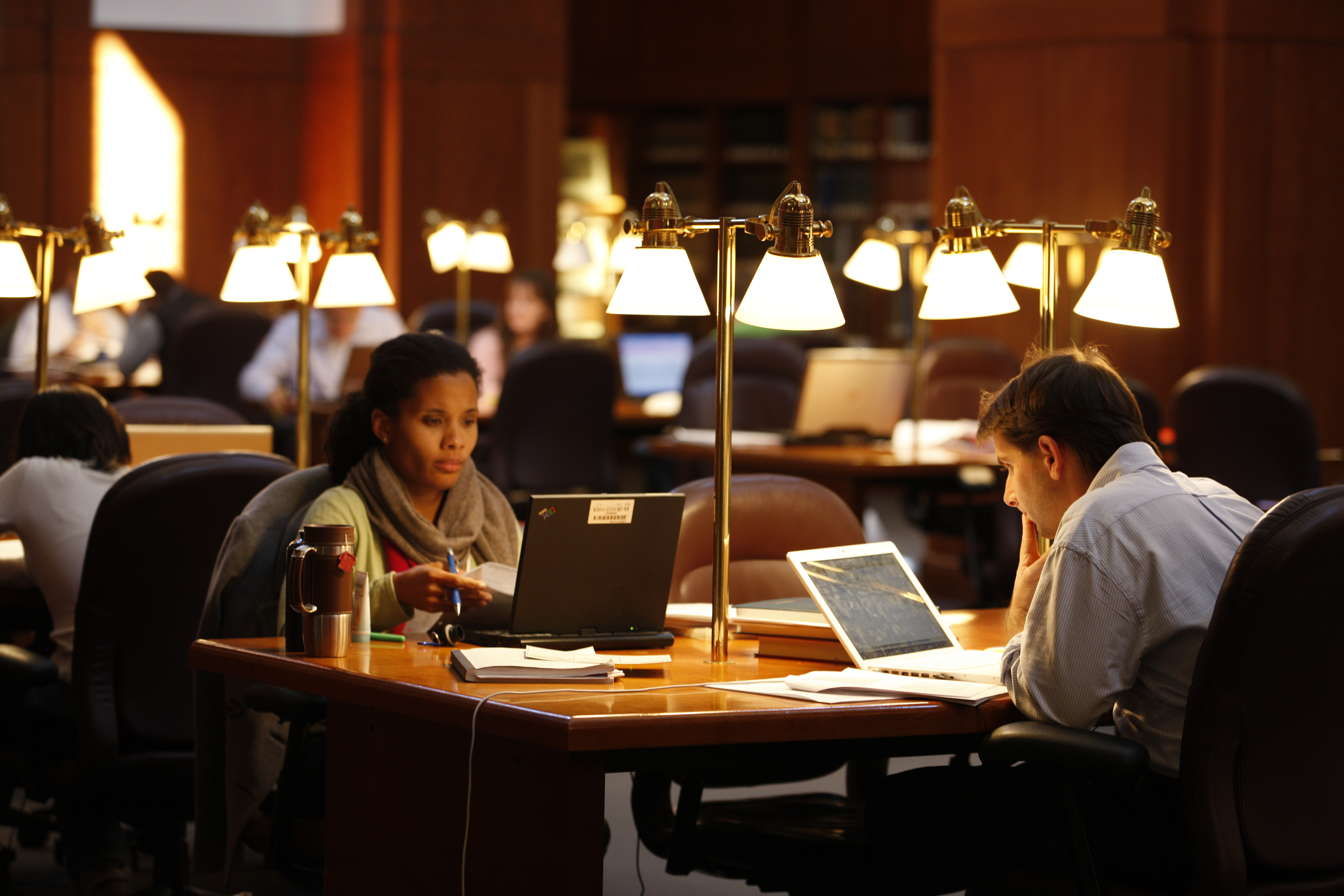
Inside the Law Library

The first library at the University of Virginia was the Rotunda. Rather than a chapel or other religious structure, the university was built around its own library. Thomas Jefferson was deeply engaged in selecting the materials that made up that library's original collection, and in developing the system by which it would be organized. The Rotunda served as the University Library for over a century, until Shannon Library was opened in 1937. Originally named Alderman Library, the Library was renamed to honor Edgar F. Shannon Jr., the University of Virginia's fourth President, in 2024.

The University of Virginia Library System consists of a dozen libraries and holds over 5 million volumes. Its Electronic Text Center, established in 1992, has put 70,000 books online as well as 350,000 images that go with them. These e-texts are open to anyone and, as of 2002, were receiving 37,000 daily visits (compared to 6,000 daily visitors to the physical libraries). Shannon Library holds the most extensive Tibetan collection in the world and holds ten floors of book "stacks" of varying ages and historical value. The Albert and Shirley Small Special Collections Library features a collection of American literature as well as two copies of the original printing of the Declaration of Independence. It was in this library in 2006 that Robert Stilling, an English graduate student, discovered an unpublished Robert Frost poem from 1918. Clark Hall is the library for SEAS (the engineering school), and one of its notable features is the Mural Room, decorated by two three-panel murals by Allyn Cox, depicting the Moral Law and the Civil Law. The murals were finished and set in place in 1934. As of 2006, the university and Google were working on the digitization of selected collections from the library system.

Since 1992, the University of Virginia also hosts the Rare Book School, a non-profit organization in the study of historical books and the history of printing that began at Columbia University in 1983.

== Other areas ==
Housing for first-year students, Brown College, the School of Engineering and Applied Science and the University of Virginia Medical School are near the historic Lawn and Range area. The McIntire School of Commerce is on the actual Lawn, in Rouss-Roberston Hall.

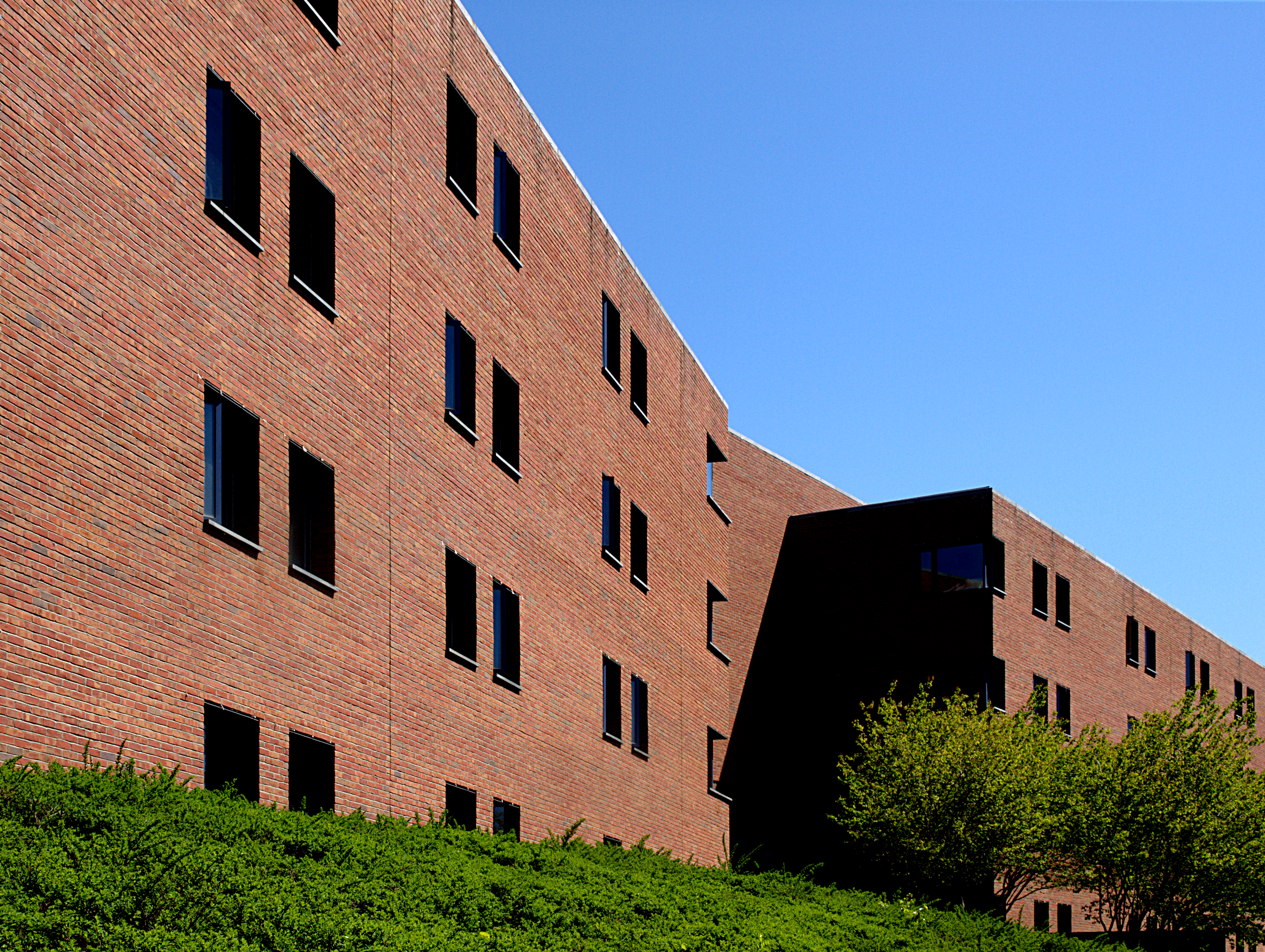
Recessed windows of the monolithic Hereford College

Away from the historic area, UVA's architecture and its allegiance to the Jeffersonian design are controversial. The 1990s saw the construction of two deeply contrasting visions: the Williams Tsien post-modernist Hereford College in 1992 and the unapologetically Jeffersonian Darden School of Business in 1996. Commentary on both was broad and partisan, as the University of Virginia School of Architecture and The New York Times lauded Hereford for its bold new lines, while some independent press and wealthy donors praised the traditional design of the Darden school. The latter group appeared to have the upper hand when the South Lawn Project was designed in the early 2000s.

Billionaire John Kluge donated 7,379 acres (29.86 km^{2}) of additional lands to the university in 2001. Kluge desired the core of the land, the 2,913-acre Morven, to be developed by the university and the surrounding land to be sold to fund an endowment supporting the core. Five farms totaling 1,261 acres (510 ha) of the gift were soon sold to musician Dave Matthews, of the Dave Matthews Band, to be used in an organic farming project to complement his nearby Blenheim Vineyards. Morven has since hosted the Morven Summer Institute, a rigorous immersion program of study in civil society, sustainability, and creativity. As of 2014, the university is developing further plans for Morven and has hired an architecture firm for the nearly three thousand acre property. In addition, the UVA Foundation owns the building and grounds of the Kluge-Ruhe Aboriginal Art Collection. The Collection itself is also owned by the University of Virginia.

== Student and faculty housing ==
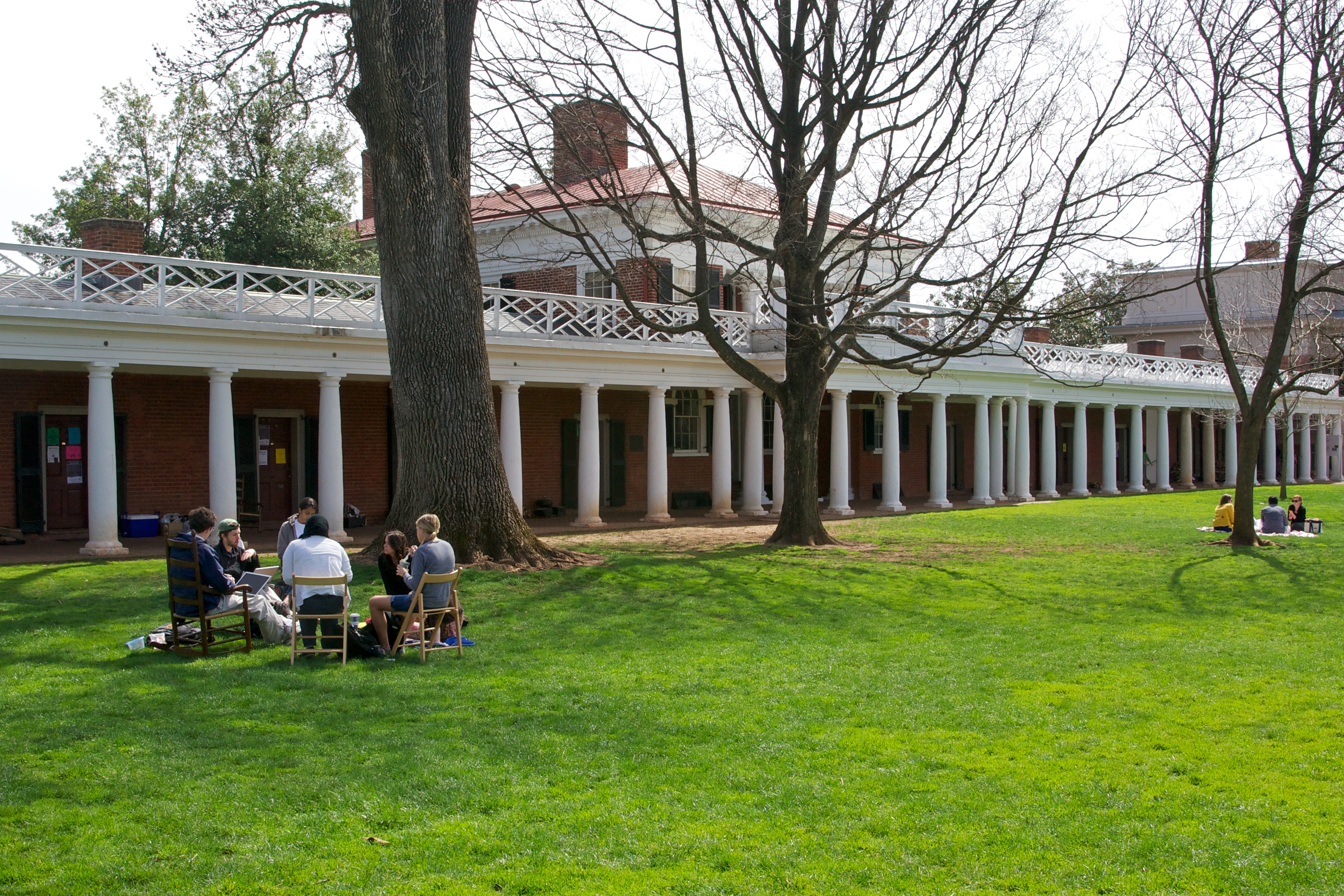
54 students are selected to live on the Lawn during their final year.

The primary housing areas for first-year students are McCormick Road Dormitories, often called "Old Dorms", Alderman Road Dormitories, often called "New Dorms", and suite style dorms located off of Alderman road near the football stadium. The 1970s-era Alderman Road Dorms are being fully replaced with brand new dormitory buildings in the same area. The replacements feature hall-style living arrangements with common areas and many modern amenities. Instead of being torn down and replaced like the original New Dorms, the Old Dorms have seen a $105 million renovation project between 2017 and 2022.

In the 1980s, in response to a housing shortage, the Stadium Road Residential Area was built to the south of the Alderman Road Dormitories. The largest of the houses in this area are the Gooch Dillard Residence Halls which house 610 students and are suite style type dorms.

There are three residential colleges at the university: Brown College, Hereford College, and the International Residential College.

It is considered a great honor and privilege to be invited to live on the Lawn, and 54 fourth-year undergraduates do so each year, joining ten members of the faculty who permanently live and teach in the Pavilions there.

Prior to May 31, 2024, the university had dedicated housing for employees on Grounds. However, the University is considering new affordable housing proposals, one of which is located on the site of the current Piedmont Housing community.

== Campus of the University of Virginia's College at Wise ==
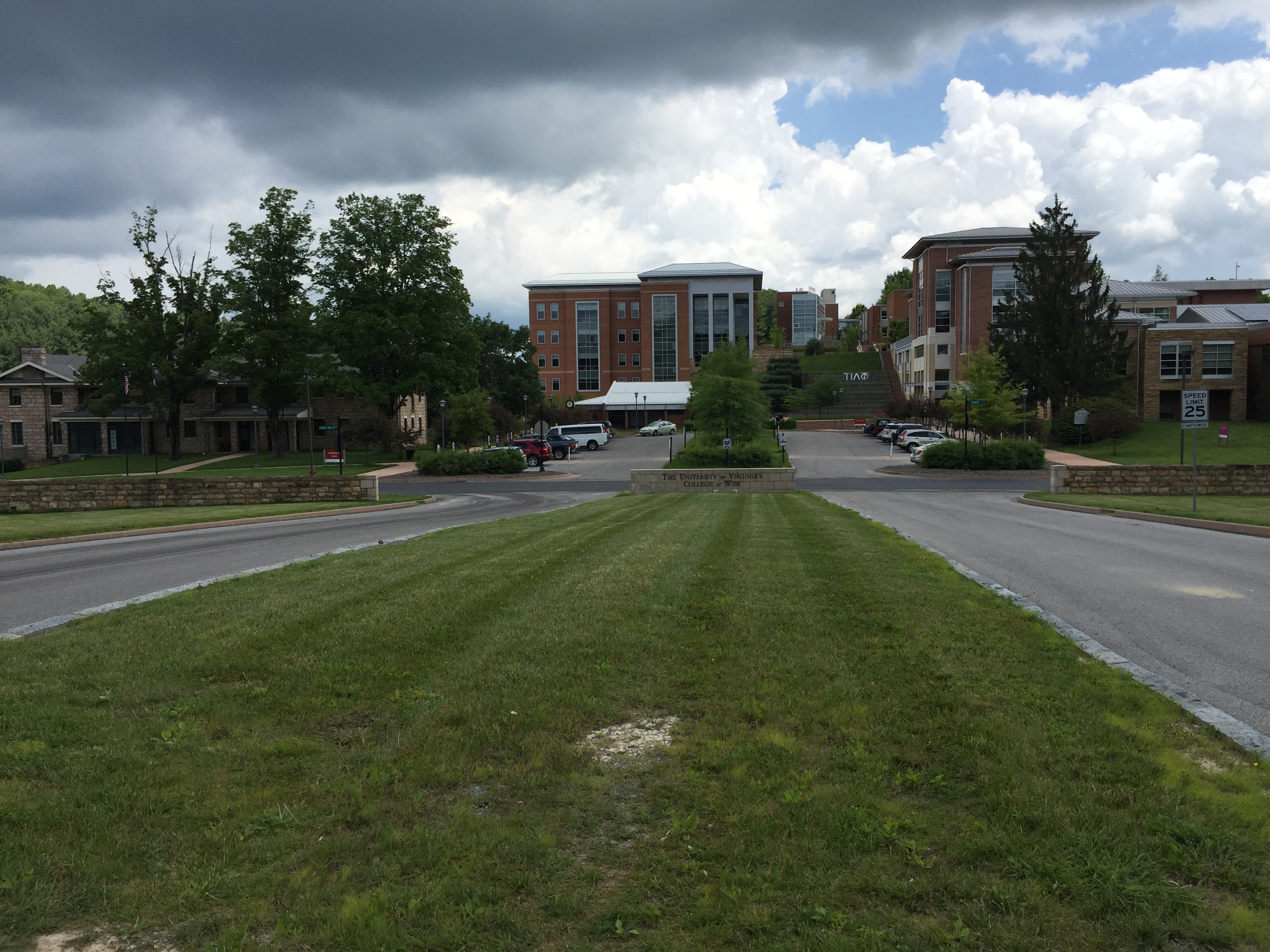
Entrance to the campus, which is designated as SR 382

The University of Virginia's College at Wise comprises 396 acres (160 ha) just outside of the small town of Wise. It is approximately 52 miles (84 kilometers) from Kingsport, Tennessee and 48.5 mi (78.1 km) from Pikeville, Kentucky.

Crockett and Bowers-Sturgill Halls are two examples of a regionally-distinct architecture: simple buildings of local sandstone with shallow-pitched hip roofs and pronounced overhangs. In 2000, VMDO Architects completed an architectural palette plan that the school has followed since.

The university is its own census-designated place, in unincorporated Wise County, Virginia. The school district serving the CDP is Wise County Public Schools.

The series of small buildings on Clinch Valley Drive, some of which had been transported to the school in the 1960s, have been slowly supplanted by larger student residence halls. The remaining buildings have now been converted to fulfill other, non-housing, functions.
