= Old dorm =

Old Dorm may refer to any of the buildings on numerous college campuses with, or previously having, the proper name, including:

- Brossman Center, which has the 1889 Old Dorm facade at the Lutheran Theological Seminary at Philadelphia
- Pennsylvania Hall (Gettysburg, Pennsylvania), of 1838 at Gettysburg College
- Schmucker Hall of 1832 at the Lutheran Theological Seminary at Gettysburg
- McCormick Road Dormitories at the University of Virginia, generally referred to as "Old Dorms"
