= Simeon Walcher Harkey =

American theologian

- Born: 3 December 1811; Iredell County, North Carolina, United States
- Died: 1 March 1889 (aged 77); Knoxville, Knox County, Illinois, United States
- Occupations: Theologian, author

Simeon Walcher Harkey (3 December 1811 – 1 March 1889) was an American Lutheran minister, clergyman and bestselling author.

== Life ==
He was born on 3 December 1811 in Iredell County, North Carolina, United States.

He married Elizabeth Mitman Harkey on September 22, 1834 and married Louisa Rachel Scherer Harkey on August 28, 1866.

He died on March 1, 1889 in Knox County, Illinois, United States.

== Education ==
He graduated from Gettysburg Lutheran seminary in 1834.

He completed his D.D. degree from the Wittenberg College in 1852.

== Career ==
In 1850, he was elected as professor of Christian theology at Hillsboro College.

He served as acting president of Hillsboro College (now called as Illinois State University) until William M. Reynolds took leadership in 1857.

== Bibliography ==
He is the author of a number of notable books:

- The character and value of an evangelical ministry
- The church's best state
- The mission of the Lutheran church in America
- Justification by faith as held and taught by Lutherans
