= Oak Ridge Seminary =

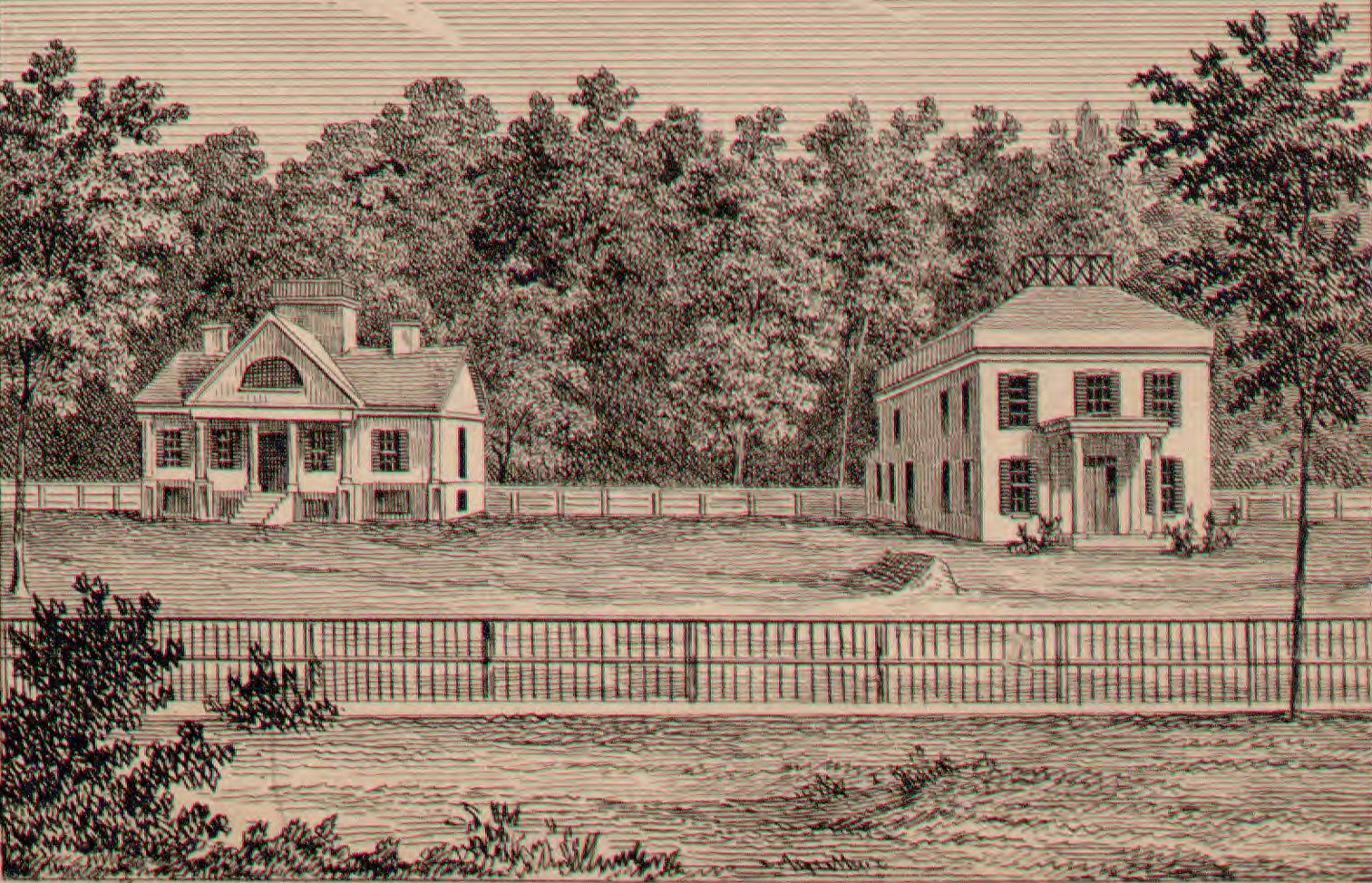
- "Oakridge Select Academy" in 1858, which was "Miss Carrie Sheads' School during the 1863 Battle of Gettysburg. The differing "Sheads House" at 331 Buford Av was claimed in 1988 to have been the 19th-century school building.

General information
- Type: school
- Location: Gettysburg, Pennsylvania, Pennsylvania, United States

The Oak Ridge Seminary (Oak Ridge Female Seminary, Oak-Ridge Academy) was an antebellum school for "young ladies" west of the borough of Gettysburg, Pennsylvania. One of 2 girls schools used as an American Civil War hospital for Battle of Gettysburg casualties, the female seminary had also been used as a prison, and General Lee's "Headquarters and tents [were] pitched in the space adjoining Oak Ridge Seminary" (a field was "on the east side of Miss Carrie Sheads' School".)

== Background ==
The first school in the area that would become Gettysburg was at the Mummasburg Road and Carlisle Street intersection on the south side of Stevens Run and by 1835, Gettysburg had five common schools. Earlier girls' schools in the Gettysburg borough included one for which Deacon James H. Marsden "took charge" after teacher applications were requested on June 23, 1829. Marsden held classes "from Sept. 25th, 1829, to April 1st, 1830, in the room, later occupied by the late Judge Wills' law office" (the school was moved to a 1-story frame building on the Eagle Hotel lot.)

"Building for a Female School"
Miss Mary McClellan's "private school" in the borough was located in a "small brick building on East High street" land donated by Mary and Catherine Leckey adjoining* the jail near Stratton Street (the street had been "Jail street" in 1823.) An 1830 meeting was held for the bidding contractors and to elect trustees, and incorporation was on April 10, 1838, [sic] under the name Gettysburg Female Academy. The Principal in 1840 was Henry W. Thorp; prices per session ranged from $5 (Junior Department, summer) to $11 (Senior Department, winter); and classes included "Latin; French; History, Ancient, Ecclesiastical, American, and English; Botany, Natural Philosophy, Chemistry, Geology, &c. &c." The Gettysburg Female Seminary was incorporated on April 14, 1835; in 1842 the "Winter Session" commenced on October 17, and the 1852 teacher was Miss Darling (Samuel Simon Schmucker was president). After the battle, "Miss Mary D. McClellan" resumed "the exercises of her School on the 10th of August", and in 1883, the brick school on High Street was sold.

By the 1863 Battle of Gettysburg, Rebecca Eyster's Young Ladies Seminary was on the "corner of Washington and High streets" at the "Old Academy Building" built 1813-5 for boys.

== Oak Ridge ==
The Oakridge Seminary was erected by Herman Haupt, later Professor of Mathematics and Engineering at Pennsylvania College (who had built an earlier structure for his residence** on Seminary Ridge.) Located near the 1815 Baltimore and Carlisle turnpike, and the 1838 Tapeworm Railroad bed, Haupt's Oakridge Select Academy was advertised in 1843 for "about 16 pupils", and Rev. William Henry Harrison, D.D., taught there prior to licensure in 1845. The school principal was Miss Carrie Sheads when Early's raids in Pennsylvania arrived at Gettysburg on June 26, 1863, and Oak Ridge Academy was at the July 1 battle area which received Confederate cannon fire. (a captured colonel returned to the school for his sword after escaping from Confederates during their retreat.)

External image
- 1843 sketch

== Notes and references ==
*A reunion was photographed in 1915 for Miss Mary McClellan's "private school", which had been near the site of the 1857 high school building on 40 East High Street which became the elementary school when high school classes moved to the borough's east side (1896 "Meade High School Building").

^{†}The jail built for $3813.12 by 1804 burned in 1850 and the new 1850 1-story jail on East High Street had 13 cells in 1901 (the 1850 jail built for $10,000 became the library.)

**The 1831 Shultz House at "4 West Confederate Avenue" was a differing "OAKRIDGE" property built as Herman Haupt's residence, and sold by Haupt in 1852. The Shultz family occupied the residence at the time of the battle (cf. Sheads and pupils at the Oakridge school), and the Shultz House was for sale in 1869-70 by Cornelia A. Shultz (Executrix) "within the borough limits". Marked with an 1896 Cast Iron Site ID Tablet by the War Department, the Seminary Ridge home is on private property near the Gettysburg National Military Park and outside of the 1999 boundaries of the Gettysburg Battlefield District. (a borough ordinance designated the Shultz House owned by Edwards in 1972 when "owned by the Gettysburg Lutheran Theological Seminary" as 1 of 38 protected historic structures. The "Shultz Farm" owned by the Maclays was part of a 1976 tour of homes, was denied permission for use as one of the American Youth Hostels in 1984 and is zoned for bed and breakfast operations.
