= Barbara Andrews (Lutheran pastor) =

American Lutheran pastor

Barbara Louise Andrews (May 11, 1935 – March 31, 1978) was an American Lutheran pastor.

A native of Minneapolis, Andrews was born with cerebral palsy and used a wheelchair throughout her life. In 1964 she became the first woman accepted as a full-time student to the Lutheran Theological Seminary, from which she graduated in 1969. She took a job on the staff of the Lutheran Campus Ministry of the University of Minnesota while in seminary. She was ordained on December 22, 1970, two months after the ordination of women had been approved by the American Lutheran Church. Elizabeth Platz had been ordained one month earlier, and the two were the first women ordained as Lutheran pastors in the United States. Two months after ordination, Andrews joined the Edina Community Lutheran Church in Edina, Minnesota as its pastor. She remained there until 1974, when she became chaplain of the Luther Haven Nursing Home in Detroit. After two and a half years, she resigned to become interim pastor of Detroit's Resurrection Lutheran Church. During this time, she also served as a chaplain for Lutheran Social Services in Michigan. Andrews died in a fire in her Detroit apartment. For her contributions to ministry, she was posthumously awarded the Faithfulness in Ministry Cross by the Luther Theological Seminary on January 5, 1995.
