= Guy Erwin =

Native American bishop

The Right Reverend Guy Erwin
- Bishop
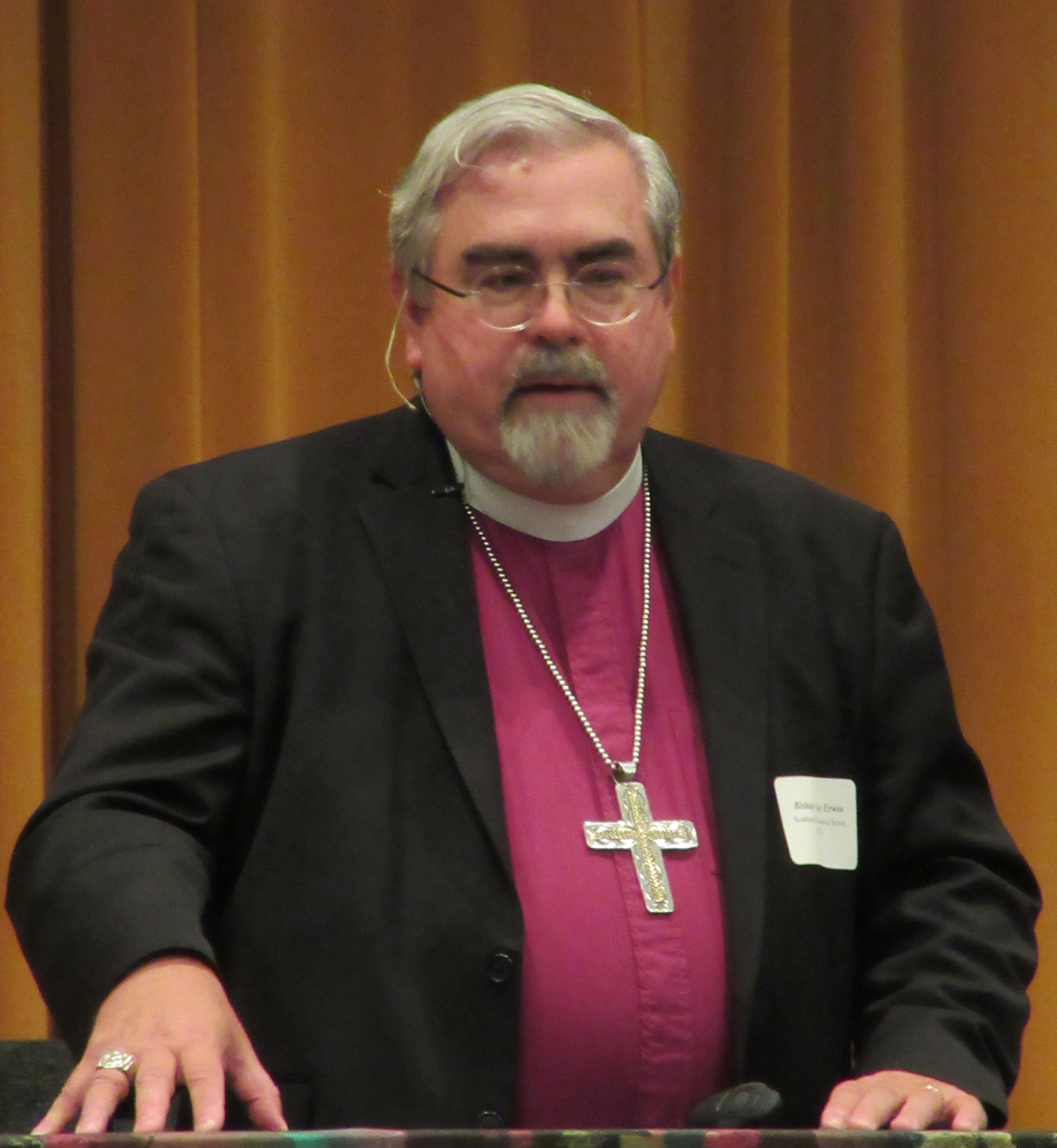
- Erwin in September 2016
- Church: Evangelical Lutheran Church in America
- See: Southwest California Synod
- In office: October 10, 2013 – August 1, 2020
- Predecessor: Dean Nelson

Personal details
- Born: 1958 (age 67–68) Pawhuska, Oklahoma, US
- Citizenship: Osage Nation • American
- Denomination: Lutheran
- Spouse: Rob Flynn (m. 2013)
- Occupation: President of the United Lutheran Seminary
- Education: Harvard University; Yale University

Robert Guy Erwin (born 1958) is an American Lutheran bishop. An Osage, he has served as president of the United Lutheran Seminary in Philadelphia since August 2020.

A citizen of the Osage Nation, Erwin is the first Native American bishop elected to office in the Evangelical Lutheran Church in America. He was ordained as a minister in 2011, two years after the denomination dropped its ban against LGBT clergy. He is the first openly gay bishop in the ELCA.

== Biography ==
Born in Pawhuska, Oklahoma, in 1958, Erwin He is a citizen of the Osage Nation. When he was eight, his family moved to Germany; there he learned to speak German, and began to be interested in church history and Lutheranism. After their return to the United States, the family settled in Sapulpa, Oklahoma. Erwin was president of the student council at Sapulpa High School, where he graduated. Erwin went to Harvard College, graduating in 1980 with a Bachelor of Arts degree. He holds the Master of Arts, Master of Philosophy, and Doctor of Philosophy degrees from Yale University. His 1991 dissertation examined the European late medieval intellectual and spiritual grounding of Martin Luther's theology of the cross.

Based on a Fulbright grant, Erwin lived in Germany for two years, where he conducted research for his doctoral dissertation and began to prepare for ministry. But in 1987, the newly created Evangelical Lutheran Church in America (ELCA) denied ordination to a group of gay and lesbian seminarians. Erwin began to work within the Lutheran Church for changes to its position on gay clergy. While teaching for years at California Lutheran University, he also served as a volunteer parish associate.

From 1993 to 1999, Erwin was lecturer in ecclesiastical history in the Yale Divinity School (YDS). He taught History of Western Christianity as well as courses on Martin Luther, the Pietists, and other topics.

Since 2000 Erwin has taught at California Lutheran University. He is considered a specialist on the life and teachings of Martin Luther, considered founder of the faith and highly influential to the Protestant Reformation.

During the 2006–2007 academic year, Erwin was visiting professor at Yale Divinity School while on sabbatical. In 2008 he was promoted to full professor.

He was ordained as a minister in 2011, two years after the ELCA dropped its ban on LGBT clergy. Two years later, in an historic vote, Erwin was elected as bishop for a customary six-year term in the Southwest California Synod, which encompasses most of the Los Angeles metropolitan area. He oversaw 126 congregations with 33,000 members. He also serves on the advisory council of the Guibord Center, an interfaith non-profit in Los Angeles.

In 2018, Erwin was appointed a member of the Venerable Order of St John.

In 2020, Erwin was appointed as president of United Lutheran Seminary.

== Personal life ==
Erwin has been in a relationship with Rob Flynn for 20 years. They were married in August 2013.
