= Alderman Road Dormitories =

Area of first-year living dormitories at the University of Virginia

Coordinates: 38.03359°N 78.51591°W

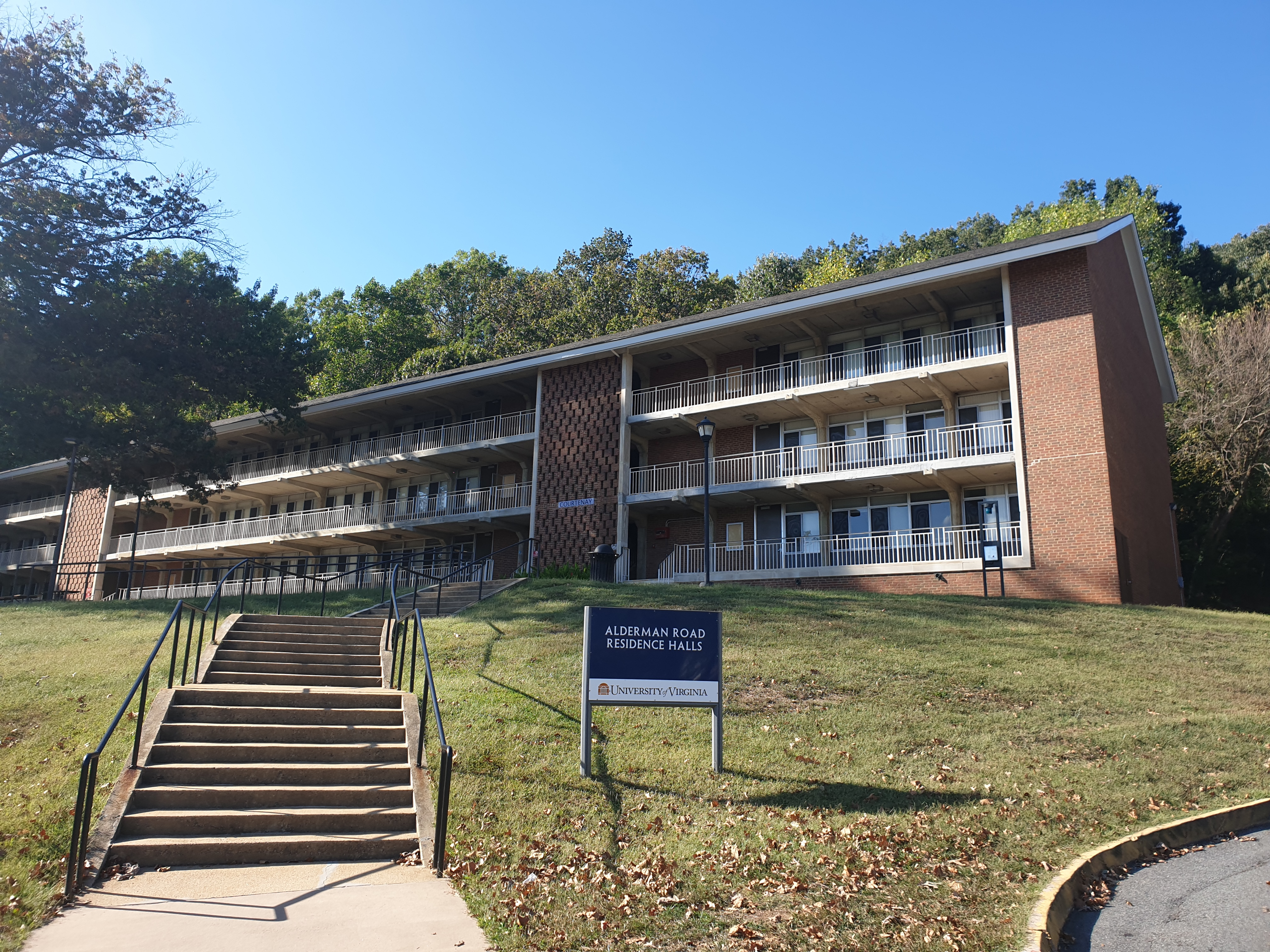
Alderman Road Residency Halls at UVA

The Alderman Road Dormitories (generally referred to as New Dorms) are one of two main areas of first-year living dormitories at the University of Virginia, the other being the McCormick Road Dormitories. There were originally eleven houses in the residence area located on Alderman Road, which were constructed in the early 1960s to accommodate a large growth in admitted students. In 2006, the University initiated a replacement project after determining that renovating the dormitories would be less cost effective and would not provide more beds for projected enrolment growth. Additionally, the University wants to provide modern amenities for its first year students. The project, which is split into four phases, were finished by 2015.

== Organization of Residence Area ==
The eleven original houses in the Alderman Road Residence Area were each named after a professor who contributed to the University. After each house is demolished during the ongoing Alderman Road Replacement Project, their names will be reassigned to the new dormitories. The houses and their replacements are:

Original House	Replacement House
Balz	Balz-Dobie
Dobie	Balz-Dobie
Watson	Watson-Webb
Webb	Watson-Webb
Lile	Lile-Maupin
Maupin	Lile-Maupin
Tuttle	Tuttle-Dunnington
Dunnington	Tuttle-Dunnington
Shannon	Shannon
Fitzhugh	--
Dunglinson	--
Courtenay	--
--	Gibbons

Additionally, Cauthen and Woody were added to the residence area in the 1990s. Kellogg was completed in 2008 and served as the model for the rest of the replacement project. Balz-Dobie and Watson-Webb houses were completed in 2011. Lile-Maupin, Tuttle-Dunnington, and Shannon houses were completed in August 2013.

The replacement dorms all feature hall-style living with modern amenities like "multi-purpose gathering spaces, laundry, study/lounge rooms, and other general use areas such as mail service and classroom space." The original houses have older suite-style living and lacked such amenities.

Rooms in Alderman Road Dorms are typically double-occupant rooms. Each double occupant room in Cauthen and Woody contains two captains beds, each room in Balz-Dobie, Kellogg, Watson-Webb contains two bunkable junior loft beds, and each room in Courtenay, Dunnington, Dunglison, and Fitzhugh contains standard bunkable beds. Every room in the Alderman Road Residence Area has two desks, two bookshelves, two chairs and two wardrobes (large closets in Courtenay, Dunglison, and Fitzhugh). All hall-style dorm rooms have air conditioning with heat and a window with blinds. Each room in suite-style dorms contains a radiator, a large window with blinds, but does not have air conditioning. The dimensions of each double-occupancy room in Cauthen, Kellogg and Woody is 15 feet by 11 feet, a double-occupancy room in Balz-Dobie and Watson-Webb is 16 feet by 11 feet, a double-occupancy room in the suite-style dorms is 16 feet by 12 feet. Courtenay, Dunglison, and Fitzhugh each have one triple-occupancy room in each suite that is 16 feet by 13 feet. The suite-style dorms also have a 24 feet by 21 feet common room per suite. All of the furniture is movable, but cannot be removed from the room during occupancy. Laundry facilities are located in Balz-Dobie, Cauthen, Tuttle-Dunnington, Kellogg, Gibbons, & Watson-Webb.

All of the buildings in this area are co-ed. In the remaining suite-style dorms, each floor has four suites per floor, with each suite holding 5 bedrooms, or 10-12 residents. In those buildings the first floor is male, the second is female and the third floor is male. There is one resident adviser per two suites, for a total of six advisers for those three buildings. In the hall-style buildings, each floor is single-sex and has about 20-24 residents per Resident Advisor.

== Student Life in Alderman Road Dorms ==
Student life in these dorms is dominated by association councils. Each set of connected houses elects an Association Council in October that consists of a President, Vice President, Secretary, and representatives from different sections of the buildings. Association Councils are in charge of organizing and planning house events, such as cookouts, Capture the Flag, games of Assassins, end of exam parties.

Often Resident Advisors will plan hall activities, such as dinners, parties, and outings for the hall or suite.

Alderman Road Dorms have three different bus stops, allowing easy access to the University’s bus system. Located close to Alderman Road Dormitories are Observatory Hill Dining Hall, The Aquatic and Fitness Center, Slaughter Rec Center, and Scott Stadium.
