= Gettysburg Academy =

Former boarding school in Pennsylvania

- Former names: Classical Preparatory School; Gettysburg Gymnasium
- Active: Classical Preparatory School: June 25, 1827; Gettysburg Gymnasium: 1829; Gettysburg Academy: November 7, 1832–1921
- Founder: Samuel Simon Schmucker
- Location: 66–68 West High Street, Gettysburg, PA, 17325, US; 39.828307°N 77.232982°W
- Campus: Gettysburg College

Gettysburg Academy (also known as the Classical Preparatory School and the Gettysburg Gymnasium) was an antebellum boys' boarding school for which the vernacular architecture schoolhouse (now "Reuning Hall") was the "first home" of the Lutheran Theological Seminary at Gettysburg and Gettysburg College.

The March 19, 1810 incorporation by the commonwealth appropriated $2,000, and the academy opened in 1814 for the school year with Samuel Ramsay as the first teacher.

By 1822 the boarding school had three dormitories, libraries, and a gymnasium and beginning in 1826, the academy trustees allowed the Lutheran seminary to use the facility — D. Jacobs established a preparatory school in June 1827 (his brother was a mathematics professor).

The facility was purchased at Sheriff's sale in 1829 by Samuel Simon Schmucker and designated the "Gettysburg Gymnasium". The 1829 headmaster was Dr. Charles H. Huber, and 2 sons of Mexico's president-elect attended. The last graduation was in 1835.

When the 1863 Battle of Gettysburg began, the Reuning House was being used by Rebecca Eyster's Young Ladies Seminary, which acted as an American Civil War hospital for casualties during the battle. Eyster's "School Halls" were advertised for rent in 1877, the house was used as World War I officers' quarters, and Reuning House is now a private residence protected by a 1972 borough ordinance extending the historical district to include the building.
