= Elizabeth Platz =

American Lutheran pastor

Elizabeth Alvina Platz is an American Lutheran pastor and was the first woman in North America ordained by a Lutheran church body.

Platz was born and raised in Pittsburgh, in a family that attended church regularly, but was not religious. She won a scholarship to attend any college in Pittsburgh, and chose to study at Chatham College, where she graduated in 1962 with a degree in history. While there, she became interested in studying theology. After graduating, she enrolled at Lutheran Theological Seminary at Gettysburg, which was the only Lutheran seminary that would accept women. While the other four women enrolled were all on the education track, Platz was able to persuade the administration to allow her to take on the Bachelors of Divinity program. After graduating in 1965, Platz served as chaplain for the Lutheran Campus Ministry at the University of Maryland, College Park.

In 1970, when the Lutheran Church in America (LCA) moved to allow women's ordination, Platz was one of the few women determined to be eligible for ordination immediately. In November 1970, she became the first woman to be ordained into the LCA. She continued to work at the University of Maryland for the rest of her career. While there, she advocated for better conditions for many groups, including graduate students and the custodial staff. She also was devoted to interfaith programming and established a fund in memory of her husband Wofford K. Smith, who had been the university's Episcopal chaplain. Platz retired from UMD in 2012, having worked 47 years as the chaplain at the Lutheran Campus Ministry

The ordination of women, approved earlier that year by both the LCA and The American Lutheran Church (ALC) was controversial. The ALC ordained its first woman as a pastor, Barbara Andrews, in December of the same year. The ALC and LCA merged in 1988 with the Association of Evangelical Lutheran Churches to form the Evangelical Lutheran Church in America (ELCA).

At the 2005 Churchwide Assembly of the ELCA in Orlando, Florida, a special program was held in honor of the 35 years since Platz's history-making ordination.
