= McCormick Road Dormitories =

Area of first-year living dormitories at the University of Virginia

Coordinates: 38°2′7″N 78°30′41″W

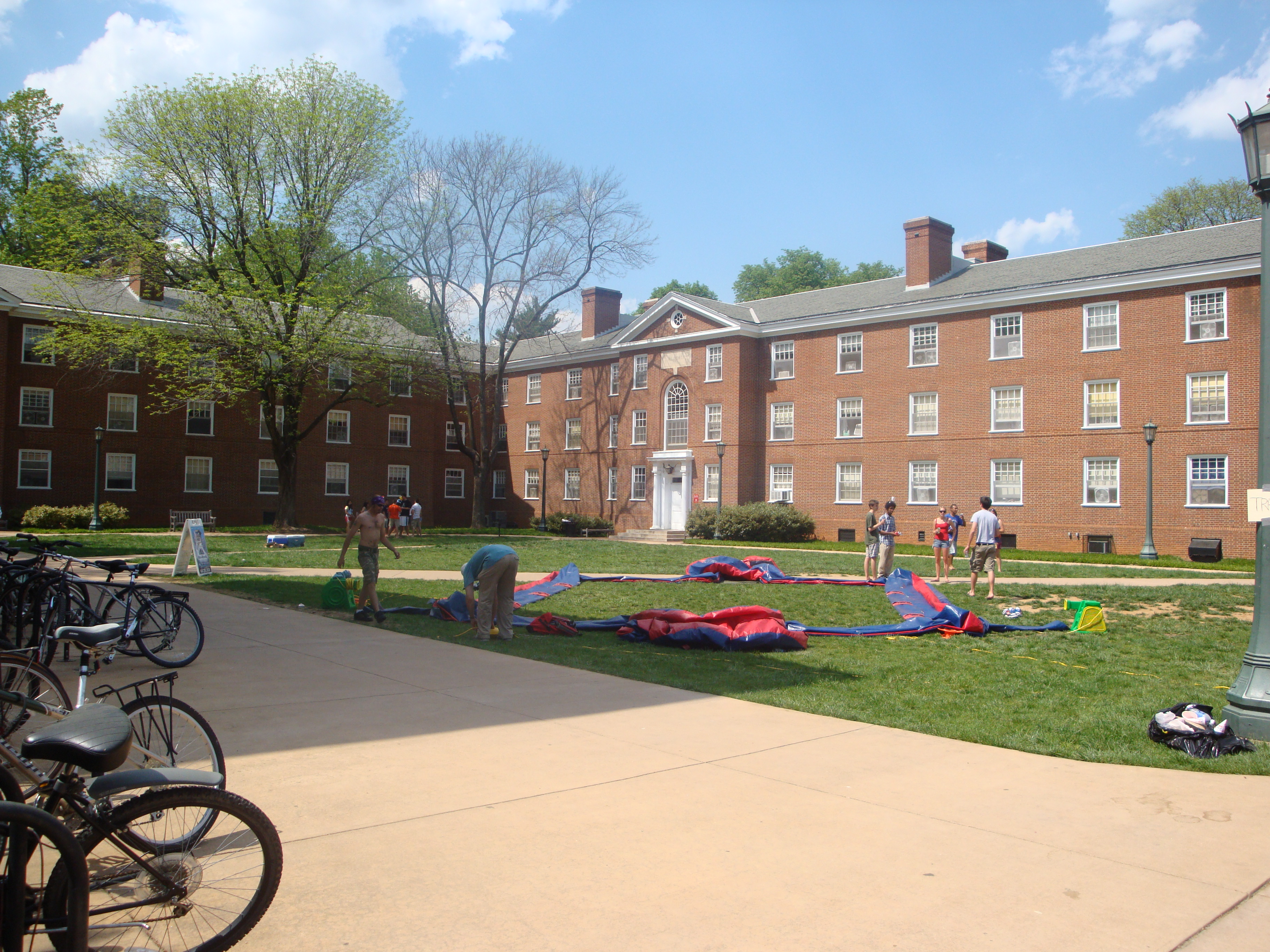
Old Dorms

The McCormick Road Dormitories (generally referred to as Old Dorms) are one of two main areas of first-year living dormitories at the University of Virginia, the other being the Alderman Road Dormitories. Ten houses make up the residence area located on McCormick Road. The dormitory area was constructed in 1950 and holds nearly 1300 students. Although older and lacking in modern amenities compared to "New Dorms," Old Dorms are closer to Central Grounds and contain larger rooms.

== History ==
After World War II, the university was in need of more student housing as college enrollment numbers swelled across the country due in part to the passage of the G.I. Bill. After several locations were considered, an old golf course was chosen as the site of the new dormitories. The construction marked the expansion of grounds westward across Emmet Street, where Old Dorms, New Dorms, the Engineering School, science buildings, the Aquatic and Fitness Center, and Scott Stadium sit today. The architects, Eggers and Higgins, decided upon a Georgian revival style that was later complemented by other new additions to the university, including Newcomb Hall and New Cabell Hall. Because the dorms were not completed until three weeks after the start of the 1950 fall semester, the inbound students due to live in the dormitories had to sleep in the Memorial Gymnasium until their completion. Although the dormitories were originally all male housing, Old Dorms became co-ed when women were officially allowed to enroll as undergraduate students in 1970. Still, the floors of each house are single-sex. WUVA, a University of Virginia radio station, was housed in the basement of Lefevre House until the mid-1990s.

== Organization ==
There are ten total houses in the McCormick Road Residence Area. Each house is named after a professor who contributed to the university. The houses are(in alphabetical order):

- Bonnycastle House
- Dabney House
- Echols House (contrary to common misconception, Echols House is not designated for first-year Echols Scholars. Most Echols Scholars live in the Alderman Rd. Residential Area)
- Emmet House
- Hancock House
- Humphreys House
- Kent House
- Lefevre House
- Metcalf House
- Page House

Except for Bonnycastle and Hancock, which are free-standing buildings, each house is connected to one other house at the corner. This forms four units of "L-shaped" buildings that surround each other, with Bonnycastle and Hancock in the back. The houses are connected as follows: Page and Emmet, Kent and Dabney, Echols and Humphreys, and Lefevre and Metcalf.

Rooms in McCormick Road Dorms are typically double-occupant rooms. Each double occupant room contains two captains beds, two desks, two bookshelves, two chairs and a large closet. Each room contains a radiator, a large window with blinds, and air conditioning. The dimensions of each double-occupancy room are 16 feet by 12 feet. All of the furniture is movable, but cannot be removed from the room during occupancy. Single-occupancy rooms are located on the edges of the halls and contain a lofted bed, and a desk. Bonnycastle and Hancock rooms are set up differently. Each room contains 2 bunkable beds and 2 built-in closets with drawers. The rooms are the same size as others in the residence area.

There are 11 rooms per hallway, with a Resident Adviser located in the center in their own room, making for a maximum total of up to 22 residents on a hall. Each floor of a house has 2 halls on a maximum of four floors. The houses are co-ed, though men live on the basement and first floors of the building, while women typically live on the second and third floors.

In the basement of Metcalf and Dabney Hall are laundry facilities for the residents. There is a key room located in the basement of the Echols dorm. The Housing office for the University of Virginia is located in the basement of Page and Emmet dorms. Emmet's basement also includes a mailroom. There is a snack bar, known as "The Castle," in the basement of Bonnycastle dorms.

== Student life ==
Student life in these dorms is dominated by association councils. Each set of connected houses elects an Association Council in October that consists of a President, Vice President, Secretary, and representatives from different sections of the building. House Councils are in charge of organizing and planning house events, such as cookouts, Capture the Flag, games of Assassins, and end of exam parties.

Often resident advisers plan hall activities, such as dinners, parties, and outings for the hall.

=== The Quad ===
The Quad is a large area in the center of the McCormick Roads Dormitory area that is commonly used for public events. It is a large grassy area that is used for public performances, first-year activities, and other events. Students are often seen outside during the warmer times of the academic year studying and socializing.
