= Lutheran Theological Seminary at Gettysburg =

Historic Lutheran seminary, merged into United Lutheran Seminary in 2017

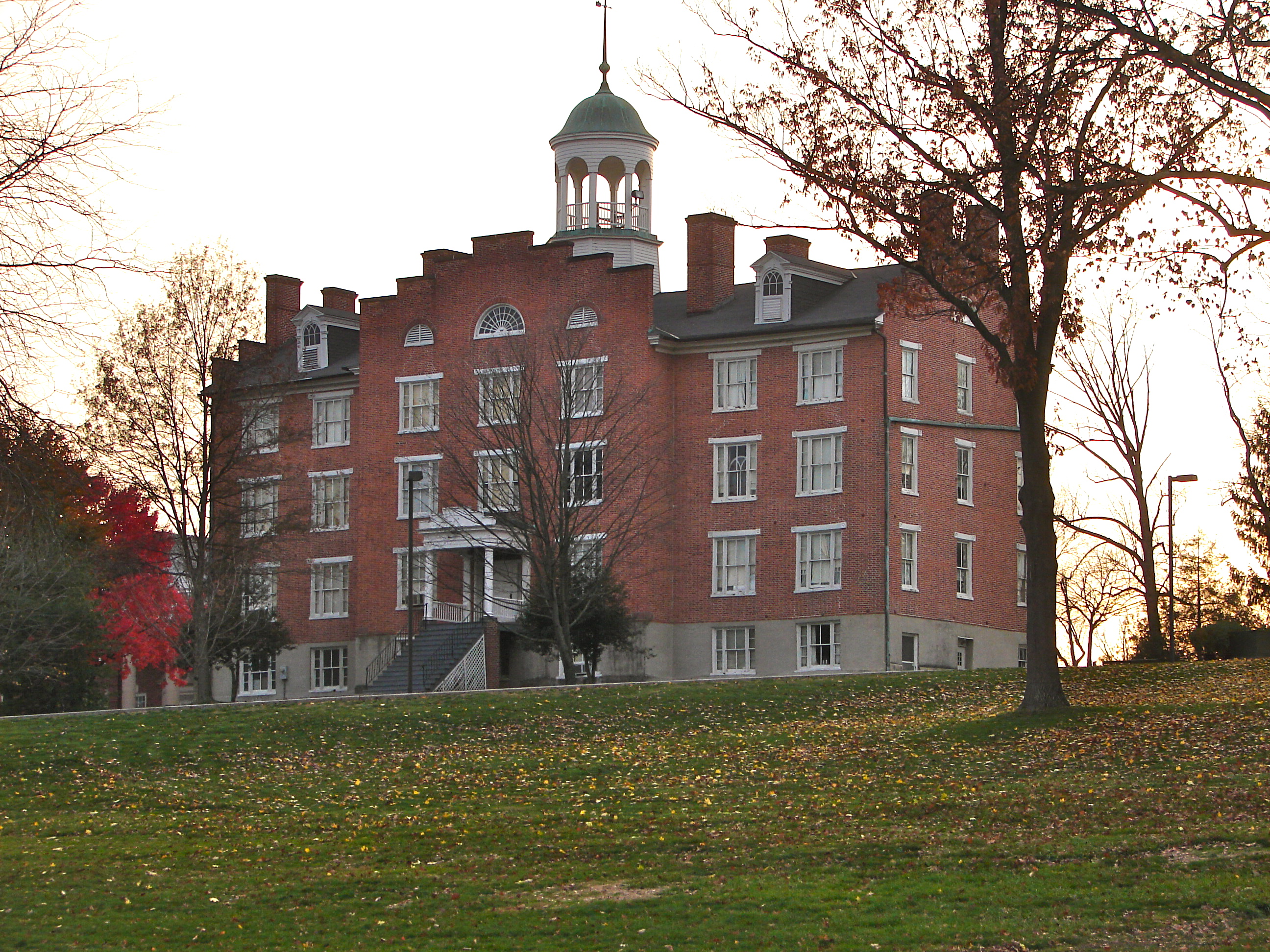
- The 1832 "Old Dorm" (now known as Schmucker Hall) was used as the "Seminary Hotel" for dignitaries at the 50th battle anniversary in 1913. A colonial-style portico was added to the southeast side in May 1914 to commemorate the reunion.
- Former name: Gettysburg Seminary
- Type: Seminary
- Active: 1826–2017
- Founder: Samuel Simon Schmucker (General Synod)
- Affiliations: Washington Theological Consortium
- Religious affiliation: Evangelical Lutheran Church in America
- Location: 61 Seminary Ridge, Gettysburg, Pennsylvania, 17325, United States; 39.83162°N 77.24433°W
- Merged into: United Lutheran Seminary (2017)
- Website: http://www.unitedlutheranseminary.edu/ (formerly http://www.ltsg.edu)

The Lutheran Theological Seminary at Gettysburg (Gettysburg Seminary) was a seminary of the Evangelical Lutheran Church in America (ELCA) in Gettysburg, Pennsylvania, United States. It was one of seven ELCA seminaries, one of the three seminaries in the Eastern Cluster of Lutheran Seminaries, and a member institution of the Washington Theological Consortium. It was founded in 1826 under prominent but controversial theologian and professor Samuel Simon Schmucker (1799–1873) for the recently organized General Synod of the Evangelical Lutheran Church in the United States. The seminary was the oldest continuing Lutheran seminary in the United States until it was merged on July 1, 2017, after 189 years of operation, with the nearby and former rival Lutheran Theological Seminary at Philadelphia to form the United Lutheran Seminary. The new institution continues to use both campuses.

The Gettysburg Seminary served the church as a pioneer in theological education creating among Lutheran seminaries the first faculty position in Christian Education in 1926, the first teacher in sociology and psychology in 1942, and the first in stewardship in 1989. Gettysburg continued to add to its trail breaking in the American scene by granting tenure to a female professor, Bertha Paulssen, in 1945, and graduating, in 1965, the first woman to be ordained by an American Lutheran church body, Elizabeth Platz (graduated in 1965 and ordained in 1970). the seminary was also the first Lutheran seminary to admit an African American theological student and seminarian, Daniel Alexander Payne, in 1835, only nine years after its founding.

During the pivotal Battle of Gettysburg in the American Civil War, the seminary, on a ridge northwest of the town, became a focal point of action on the first day of battle, July 1, 1863. The seminary gave its name to the now iconic Seminary Ridge, where the line of battle of the Confederate Army of Northern Virginia was formed for the later actions on the second and third days of the battle. The headquarters of commanding Gen. Robert E. Lee was established in a stone cottage across the northwest Cashtown Road.

== History ==
=== 19th century ===
At the 1820 formation of the General Synod of the Evangelical Lutheran Church in the United States, its constitution specified that the synod form plans for a seminary or seminaries. Samuel Simon Schmucker, ordained in 1820, actively lobbied for the establishment of a seminary and began theological training for students at his parsonage in New Market, Virginia. After hearing Schmucker speak in 1824 about his efforts, the Maryland-Virginia Synod recommended to the General Synod in 1825 that a seminary be established.

The board of directors first met on March 2, 1826, in Hagerstown, Maryland, with the first order of business being to select a site for the seminary. They rejected proposals from Carlisle, Pennsylvania (at Dickinson College) and Hagerstown and the "Gettysburg Theological Seminary" was established on August 1, 1826. Schmucker was elected the first professor and the seminary opened with eight students on September 5, 1826, in the Gettysburg Academy building, which had opened 1810. In 1832, the seminary moved to its first building on the ridge west of the borough, the ridge now eing known as Seminary Ridge.

Following Schmucker, the seminary had "faculty chairmen" rather than presidents. The first seminary president, John Alden Singmaster, was designated in 1906.

==== Role in the Battle of Gettysburg ====
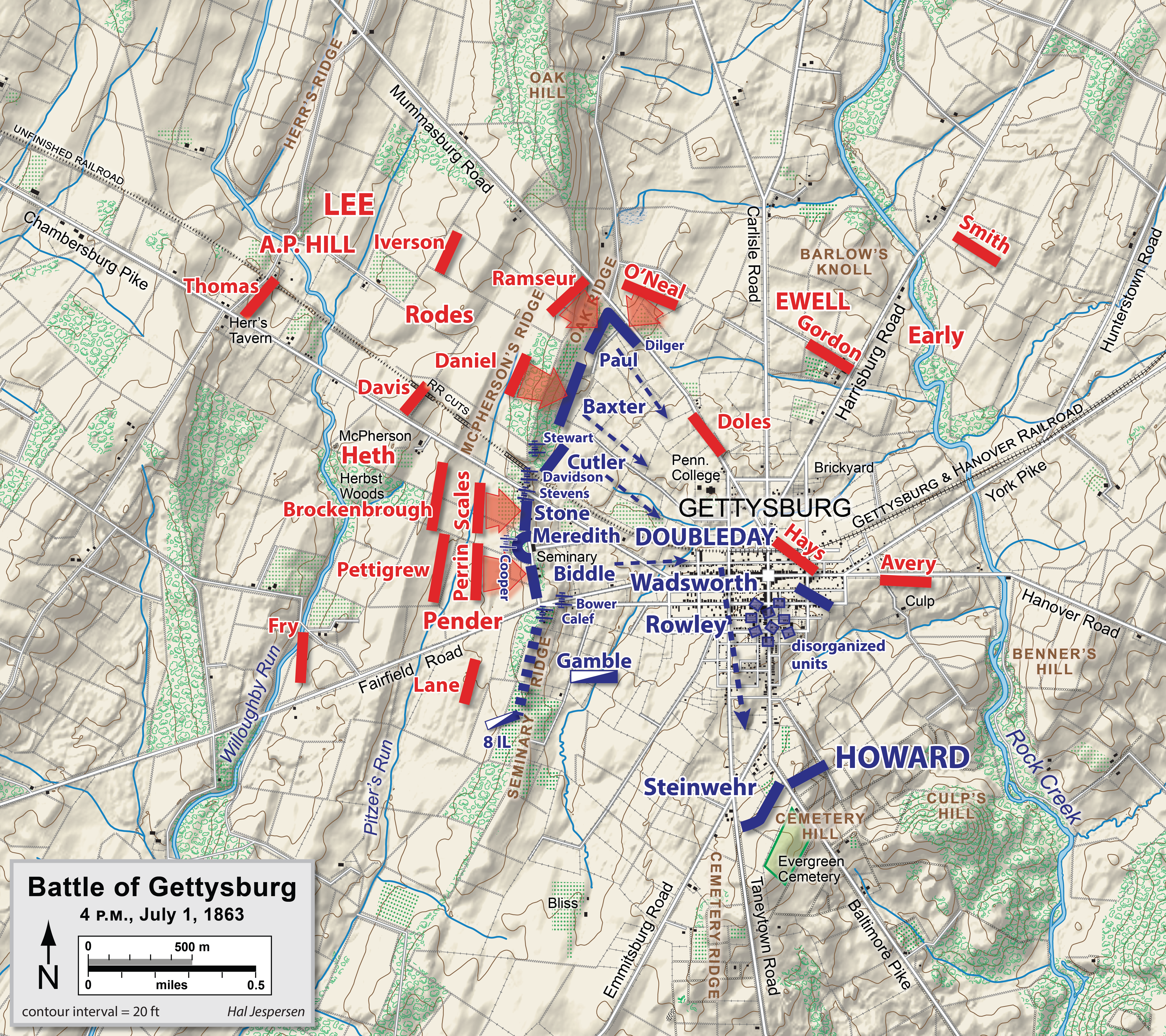
On July 1, 1863 at 4 p.m., the Army of the Potomac was positioned at the seminary.

The Seminary building served as a lookout on July 1, 1863, the first day of battle. From the cupola, Brig. Gen. John Buford, commanding First Division, Cavalry Corps, Army of the Potomac, observed the opening of the battle to the west of Seminary Ridge and witnessed the arrival of the I Corps under Maj. Gen. John Reynolds marching to his relief from the south.

By the late afternoon, the Union lines on McPherson's Ridge, west of the seminary, were forced back to Seminary Ridge by Confederate troops of Heth's and Pender's divisions. Before the troops could dig in on Seminary Ridge, a further attack by Pender's division broke the line. The I Corps streamed across Seminary Hill and through the town of Gettysburg, covered by a delaying action on the grounds by the famed Iron Brigade. The Confederate Army of Northern Virginia occupied the seminary grounds and held them until the Army's retreat on July 4, 1863.

There was no further infantry combat on the seminary grounds, but it continued to play a prominent role in the battle. The seminary building had begun to be used as a field hospital for soldiers of both armies during the first day, and this continued throughout the engagement and after the battle was over. Artillery was posted on the hill and participated in action against Union artillery on Culp's and Cemetery Hills on July 2 and 3.

Confederate soldiers ransacked the house of seminary President Schmucker, an outspoken abolitionist. Confederate troops also used the seminary building cupola as a lookout, although there is no hard evidence that General Robert E. Lee, whose headquarters were just across the Cashtown Road to the north of the seminary, ever entered the cupola.

The seminary contains multiple commemorative markers and monuments along its main drive, called Seminary Ridge (formerly, Confederate Ave). The park commission had placed two Confederate 3" rifles, two other Confederate guns, and two Union 12-pounders ("False Napoleon") along the avenue by 1912.

==== Subsequent campus history ====
In 1868, some seminary land was purchased for the Gettysburg Springs Railroad (now Springs Avenue) and the faculty expanded to a fourth professor (James W. Richard) in 1889. In 1895, during the battlefield commemorative era, the Gettysburg Park Commission telfordized the seminary's north–south avenue (resurfaced in 1927). In 1896, the seminary had two academic buildings, four professor dwellings, a hospital, and approximately 38 acres (15 ha).

The cornerstone of the Church of the Abiding Presence was laid in 1940 and construction was completed in 1942.

During the World War II labor shortage, the seminary assisted with the county's 1942 apple harvest before German POWs became available, and a seminary auxiliary was organized in 1953.

In about 1960, the seminary purchased the nearby Elsie Singmaster Lewars home and in 1961, the Adams County Historical Society moved from the courthouse basement to Old Dorm (added to the NRHP in 1974). In 2011, the society moved into Wolf House, also owned by the seminary. The 2011 "Crossroads Campaign" planned $1.8 million of fundraising for chapel renovations.

== Merger ==
In January 2016, the seminary's board announced a merger with the Lutheran Theological Seminary at Philadelphia. While originally planned as a closure of both schools with the formation of a new institution, that plan was canceled over accreditation issues and a merger of the two schools was completed 1 July 2017, under the name United Lutheran Seminary.

== Notable alumni ==
- Cornelius L. Keedy (1834–1911), pastor, physician, and academic administrator
- Daniel Payne (1811–1893), first ordained Black Lutheran pastor in the United States and leader of the African Methodist Episcopal Church
- Elizabeth Platz, first Lutheran woman ordained in the United States, (1970), served her entire active ministry as campus pastor at the University of Maryland.
- William Morton Reynolds (1812–1876), minister, college president, and translator
