= Schmucker Hall =

American Civil War site in Adams County, Pennsylvania

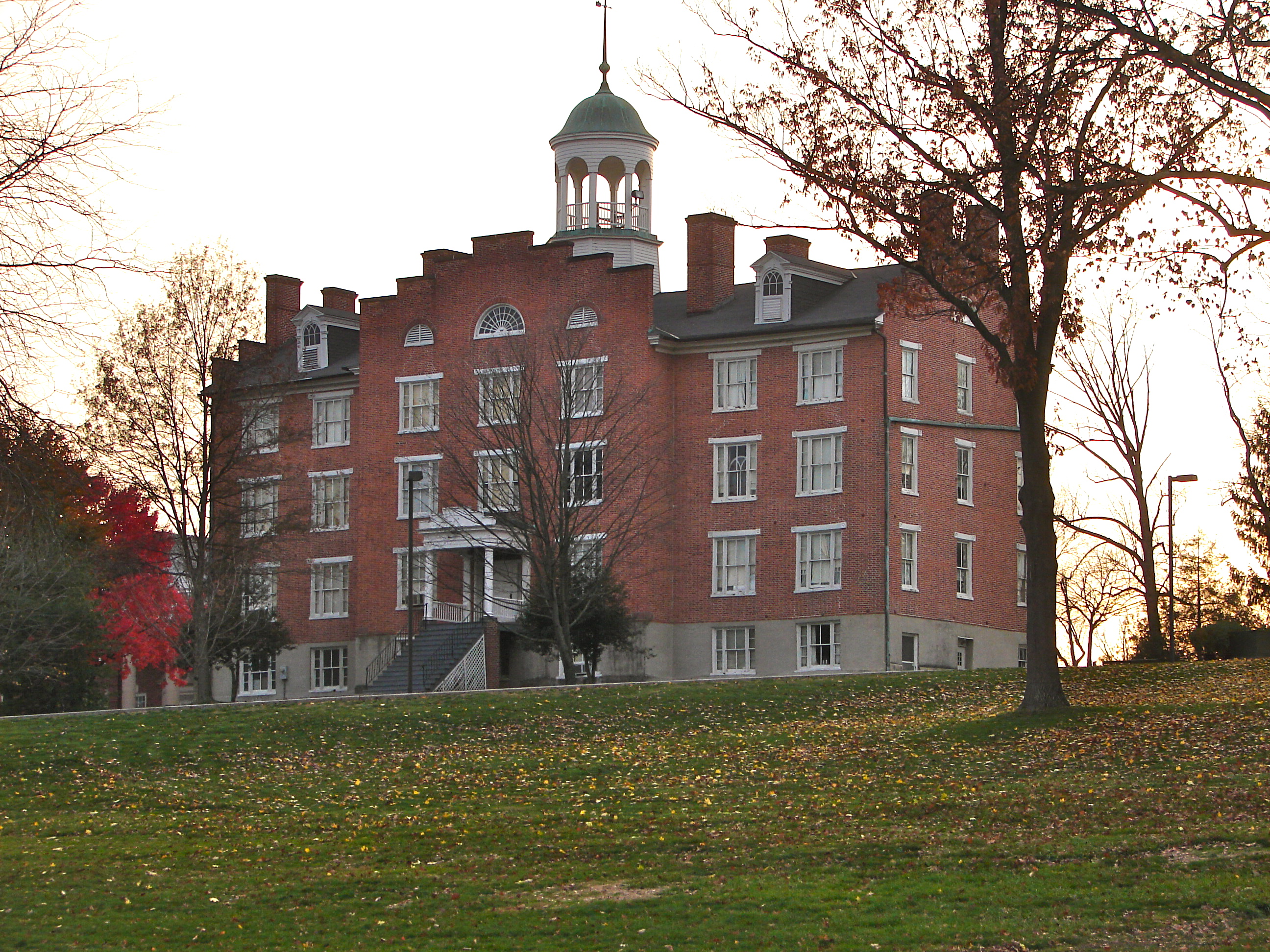
- Old Dorm was used as the 1913 "Seminary Hotel" for dignitaries at the 50th battle anniversary. A May 1914 colonial portico was added to commemorate the reunion (only the concrete base remains.)
- Interactive map of the Schmucker Hall area

General information
- Location: 111 Seminary Avenue, Lutheran Theological Seminary, United States
- Coordinates: 39°49′55″N 77°14′41″W
- Lutheran Theological Seminary-Old Dorm
- U.S. National Register of Historic Places
- Location within Pennsylvania
- Location: Seminary Ridge, Lutheran Theological Seminary campus, Gettysburg, Pennsylvania
- Area: less than one acre
- Built: 1832
- Architectural style: Federal
- NRHP reference No.: 74001729
- Added to NRHP: May 3, 1974

Schmucker Hall is an American Civil War site listed on the National Register of Historic Places in Adams County, Pennsylvania, that was constructed as the original Gettysburg Theological Seminary building. Used as both a Union and Confederate hospital during the 1863 Battle of Gettysburg, the facility served as the seminary's main building from 1832 to 1895, then as a dedicated dormitory for students until 1951. In 1960, it was leased by the Adams County Historical Society. Beginning in 2006, the Historical Society, along with the Seminary Seminary Ridge Historic Preservation Foundation, rehabilitated the building for adaptive reuse as the Seminary Ridge Museum. The Adams County Historical Society moved into the nearby Wolf House on the seminary campus preceding the renovation. In 2013, on the 150th anniversary of the battle, the Seminary, the Adams County Historical Society and the Seminary Ridge Historic Preservation Foundation opened the building as the Seminary Ridge Museum. The Museum houses displays about many different aspects of the battle, the seminary, the town, and the civil war, and the struggle among faith groups over slavery, as well as offering tours of the cupola. The exhibit and museum have earned international, national and regional awards and the rehabilitation achieved LEED Certification in 2013.

== History ==
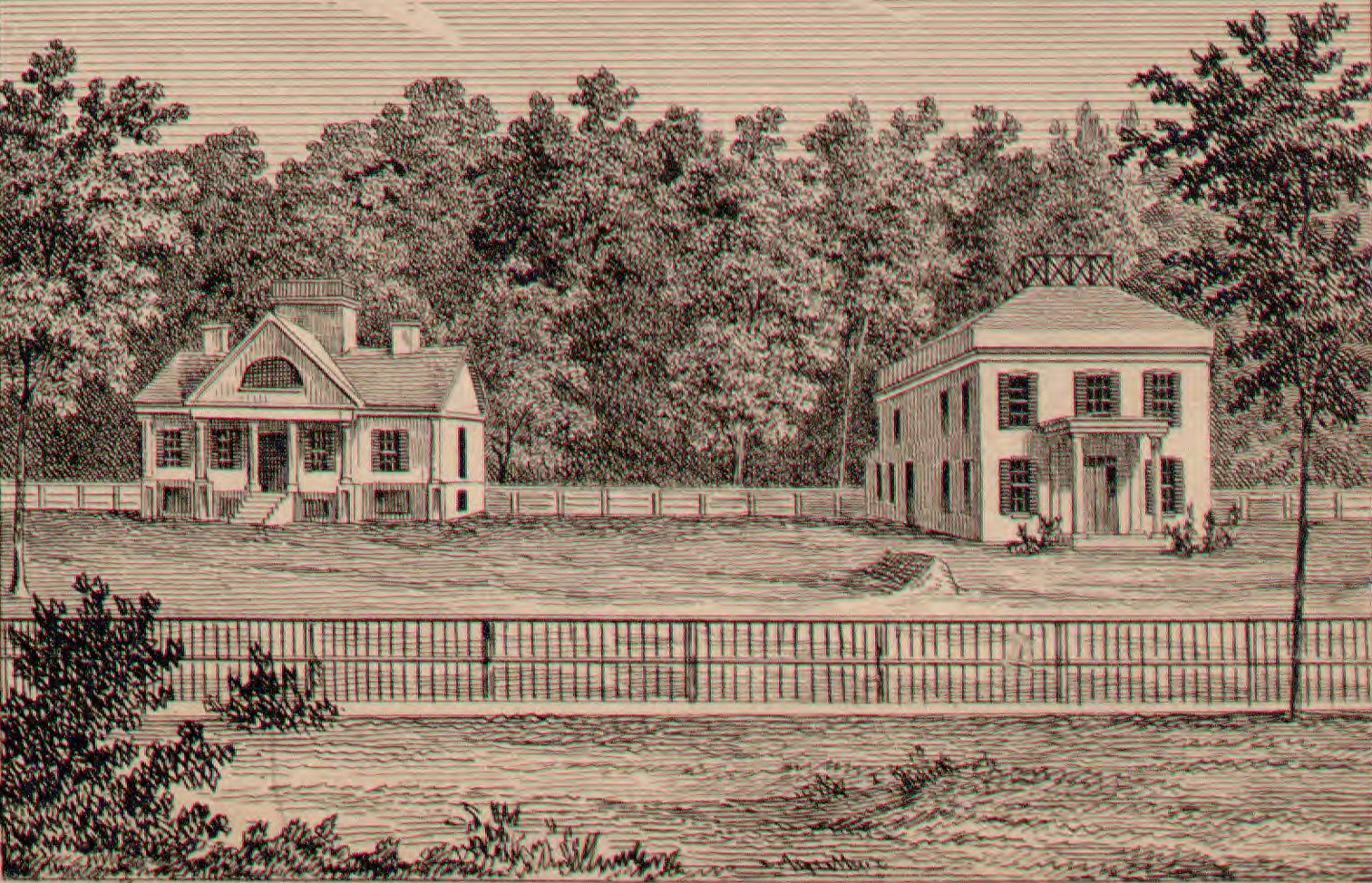
Oakridge Select Academy

The seminary opened with 11 students on September 5, 1826, at the 1810 Gettysburg Academy building. An 1830 request for proposals was advertised for constructing the "whole building to be 100 feet, viz. the Centre building to be 50 feet square, two stories each 14 feet high--with two wings, 30 by 25 feet, three stories each 9 feet high. The wall of the first story of the Centre building is to be 18 inches thick--the second story and Wings to be 14 inches; to be covered with joint shingles, of white pine." The construction established the seminary campus between the Chambersburg Pike and Nichol's Gap Road west of the Gettysburg borough on a ridge which became known as Haupt's Hill after Herman Haupt built his nearby 1837 Oakridge Select Academy.

Battle of Gettysburg

Along with the "S. S. Schmucker" and "C. P. Krauth" professor dwellings of 1833 & 1834 (e.g., Confederates ransacked "the Schmucker house"), Old Dorm was used during the Gettysburg campaign (e.g., the Old Dorm cupola was used as an observatory on June 30.) The nearby area was used by Union artillery July 1 prior to the "last stand of the Union 1st Corps on Seminary Ridge", then by Confederate artillery after being captured in late afternoon. The last patient at the hospital left on September 16, 1863 (Colonel George McFarland),

Lightning set the cupola afire in 1913 and seminary use of Old Dorm ended in 1954. The 1939 Adams County Historical Society moved to the building in April 1961 and in 1995 began their current 30 year lease (the preceding archive library was in the county courthouse). In 1972, the building was designated an historic district contributing structure by the Gettysburg council (1 of 38 outside of the borough), and in 1976 the Daughters of the American Revolution dedicated the hall's "American Heritage Room". Schmucker Hall was filmed for the 1993 Gettysburg motion picture which depicted its cupola as a July 1 Gettysburg Battlefield "observation tower" (cf. the Fahnestock House). In 2004, Schmucker Hall was designated for restoration by the 1999 Seminary Ridge Historic Preservation Foundation with funding assistance by the Gettysburg National Military Park, and in 2008 the hall's sign was designated in the Historical Marker Database. In 2013, on the 150th anniversary of the battle, the Adams County Historical Society and the Seminary Ridge Historic Preservation Foundation opened the building as the Seminary Ridge Museum. The Museum houses displays about many different aspects of the battle, the seminary, the town, and the civil war, as well as offering tours of the cupola.

External image
- 1913 photo ("Cupola used by Genl. Lee")
