= List of University of Virginia people =

The University of Virginia is a public university in Charlottesville, Virginia, United States. Following is a partial list of its notable alumni, faculty, board members, and rectors.

== Alumni ==
"Col" stands for College of Arts and Sciences.

=== Academics and education ===
Name	Class	School or degree	Notability	References
William Antholis	1986	Col	Director of UVA's Miller Center; former managing director of Brookings; former White House and State Department staff	
Donald J. Boudreaux	1992	Law	Professor at the Mercatus Center at George Mason University	
Claire-Marie Brisson	2021	Ph.D	Preceptor in French, Harvard University	
William Yancey Brown	1969	Col	President of Bishop Museum, author and institutional leader	
John T. Casteen III	1965, 1970	Col, graduate	President of the University of Virginia	
Edmund M. Clarke	1967	Col	FORE Systems Professor of Computer Science Emeritus at Carnegie Mellon University and recipient of the 2007 A.M. Turing Award	
Anita H. Clayton	1982	Med	Chair of Psychiatry and Neurobehavioral Sciences at the University of Virginia School of Medicine	
John R. Conniff		Law	President of Louisiana Tech University, 1926–1928	
Douglas Day	1954	BA; MA, PhD English	Author, William Faulkner scholar, Clifton Waller Professor of English and Comparative Languages at UVa	
David Ellenson	1973	MA Religion	President emeritus and chancellor of Hebrew Union College-Jewish Institute of Religion	
Jerry Falwell Jr.	1986	Law	Chancellor and president, Liberty University	
Gary L. Francione		Law	Professor at Rutgers University	
Joanne B. Freeman	1993, 1998	MA, Ph.D	Professor of History and American Studies at Yale University	
Wade Hampton Frost	1903	Medicine	Founding dean of Johns Hopkins School of Public Health, established epidemiology as a science	
Elizabeth Garrett	1988	Law	President of Cornell University; former provost of the University of Southern California	
J. Hartwell Harrison	1932	Medicine	Professor, Harvard Medical School; donor surgeon–premier kidney transplant; editor, Campbell's Urology (4th ed., 1978)	
Roger Harold Hull	1974	Law	President of Beloit College and Union College	
Charles W. Kent	1882	Col	English professor at UVA	
Gloria Cordes Larson	1976	Law	President of Bentley University	
Helen Matthews Lewis	1949	Graduate	Sociologist, historian, and activist	
Edgar Odell Lovett	1895	Graduate	Mathematician, astronomer, first and longest-tenured president of Rice University	
Richard A. Lutz	1971	Col	Professor at the Rutgers Department of Marine and Coastal Sciences	
M. Elizabeth Magill	1995	Law	Dean of Stanford Law School	
J. Hillis Miller Sr.	1928	Graduate	President of the University of Florida (1947–1953)	
Blake Morant	1975, 1978	Col, Law	Dean of George Washington University Law School	
Nick Morgan	1977, 1981	MA, PhD	Assistant vice president and provost, University of Virginia; professor at Princeton University	
Edward P. Ney	1946	Ph.D	Physicist and college professor who made major contributions to cosmic ray research and atmospheric physics	
Marvin Banks Perry Jr.	1940	Col	President of Goucher College and Agnes Scott College	
Harrison Randolph	1892	Graduate	President of the College of Charleston (1897–1945)	
W. Taylor Reveley, III	1968	Law	President, The College of William and Mary; former dean and professor of law at William & Mary Law School	
William Craig Rice	1975	Col	President of Shimer College	
Larry Sabato	1974	Col	Director of the University of Virginia Center for Politics	
Alex Sanders	1990	Law	President of the College of Charleston (1992–2001)	
Thomas A. Saunders III	1967	Darden	Chairman of The Heritage Foundation	
Stuart Schreiber	1977	Col	Chemical biologist; founding member of the Broad Institute of Harvard and MIT	
Nicole Shelton	1996, 1998	M.A., Ph.D	Professor of psychology at Princeton University	
Brooks D. Simpson	1979	Col	Professor of history at Arizona State University	
Robert Sitkoff	1996	Graduate	Professor at Harvard Law School	
Valerie Smith	1978, 1982	Graduate	President, Swarthmore College; former dean of the college, Princeton University	
William G. Thomas III	1991, 1995	M.A., Ph.D	History professor at the University of Nebraska–Lincoln, 2016 Guggenheim Fellow	
Richard E. Wagner	1966	Ph.D	Professor emeritus of economics at George Mason University	
John C. White	1998	Col	Louisiana superintendent of education	
William Wulf	1966	Graduate	President of the National Academy of Engineering, designer of BLISS programming language	

=== Art and architecture ===
Name	Class	School or degree	Notability	References
Robert Llewellyn	1968	Engineering Science	Photographer	
Georgia O'Keeffe		Non-degreed	Painter	
Nelson Saiers	1997, 1998	Col, graduate	Artist and hedge fund manager	

=== Business ===
Name	Class	School or degree	Notability	References
Lee Ainslie	1986	Col	Founder and managing partner of Maverick Capital	
Eric C. Anderson	1996	Engineering	President and CEO, co-founder, Space Adventures	
David T. Beers	1975	Col	Special adviser to the governor of the Bank of Canada, former head of sovereign credit ratings, Standard & Poor's	
Alfred Berkeley	1966	Col	President, NASDAQ Stock Exchange	
John H. Bryan	1960	Darden	CEO and chairman of Sara Lee	
Jonathan Bryan	1896		President, Richmond-Ashland Railway Company and Bryan, Kemp & Co. brokerage	
Algernon S. Buford	1850	Law	President, Richmond and Danville Railroad	
W. Graham Claytor Jr.	1933	Col	President, Southern Railway and Amtrak; and U.S. secretary of the Navy	
George David	1967	Darden	Chairman and CEO, United Technologies Corporation	
William A. Hawkins	1982	Darden	CEO, Medtronic Corp.	
Steve Huffman	2005	Engineering	Co-founder of Reddit	
Bob Hugin	1985	Darden	Chair of Celgene	
Mansoor Ijaz	1983	Col	Founder and chairman, Crescent Investment Management Ltd	
Paul Tudor Jones	1976	Col	President and founder, Tudor Investment Corporation and Robin Hood Foundation	
Stephen P. Joyce	1982	Comm	President and CEO of Choice Hotels; CEO of Dine Brands Global	
Randal J. Kirk	1979	Law	Founder and chairman, New River Pharmaceutical	
Alan Lafley		Non-degreed	CEO, chairman of the board, Procter & Gamble	
Meredith Kopit Levien	1993	Col	President and chief executive officer of The New York Times Company	
Alexander F. Mathews	1856	Graduate	President and founder of Bank of Lewisburg and First National Bank of Ronceverte	
Halsey Minor	1987	Col	Co-founder and former CEO, CNET Inc.	
Daniel Mudd	1980	Col	CEO, Fannie Mae	
Tammy Murphy	1987	Col	Analyst, associate, and project lead at Goldman Sachs	
Michelle Nunn	1989	Col	CEO, Points of Light; president of Care International USA	
Alexis Ohanian	2005	Comm	Co-founder of Reddit	
William Nelson Page		Non-degreed	Co-founder of the Virginian Railway	
Charlie Papazian	1972	BS Nuclear Engineering	Founder of the Association of Brewers and the Great American Beer Festival	
Steven Reinemund	1978	Darden	Chairman and CEO, PepsiCo Inc.	
Mendel Rosenblum	1984	Col	Co-founder of VMware	
Julio Mario Santo Domingo	1948	Col	Colombian businessman, billionaire	
Sheridan Snyder	1958	Col	Entrepreneur and philanthropist	
Samuel Spencer	1868	Engineering	President, Southern Railway	
Mark B. Templeton	1978	Darden	President and CEO, Citrix Systems	
Jaffray Woodriff	1991	Comm	CEO and co-founder of Quantitative Investment Management (QIM)	
Robert R. Young		Non-degreed	Chairman of the board, C&O Railroad	

=== Entertainment ===
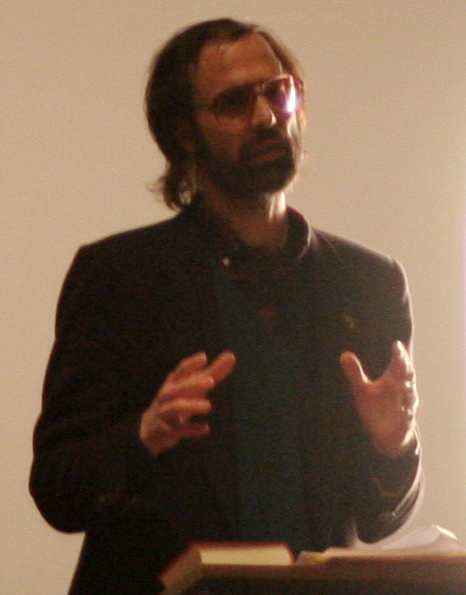
David Berman

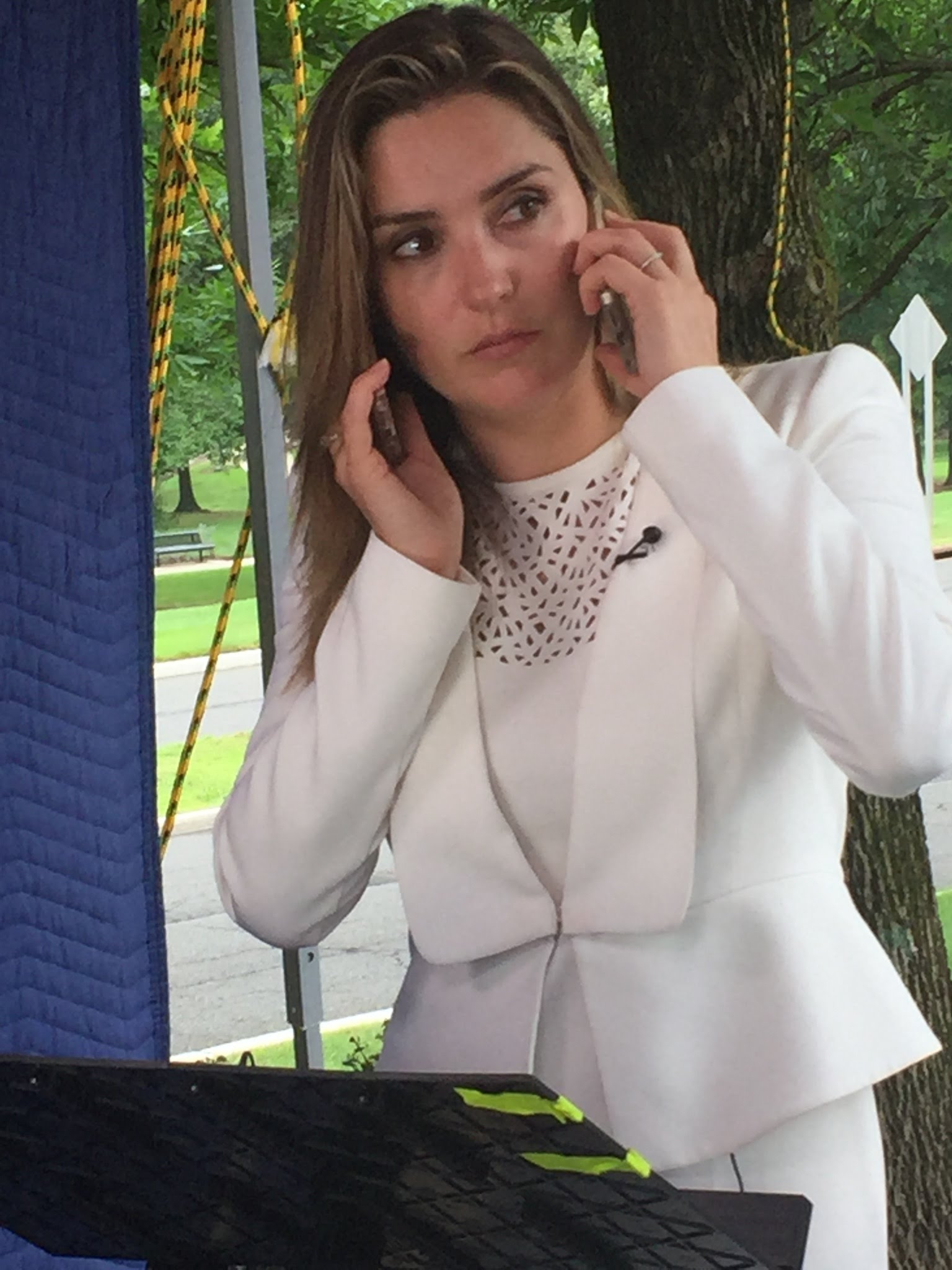
Margaret Brennan

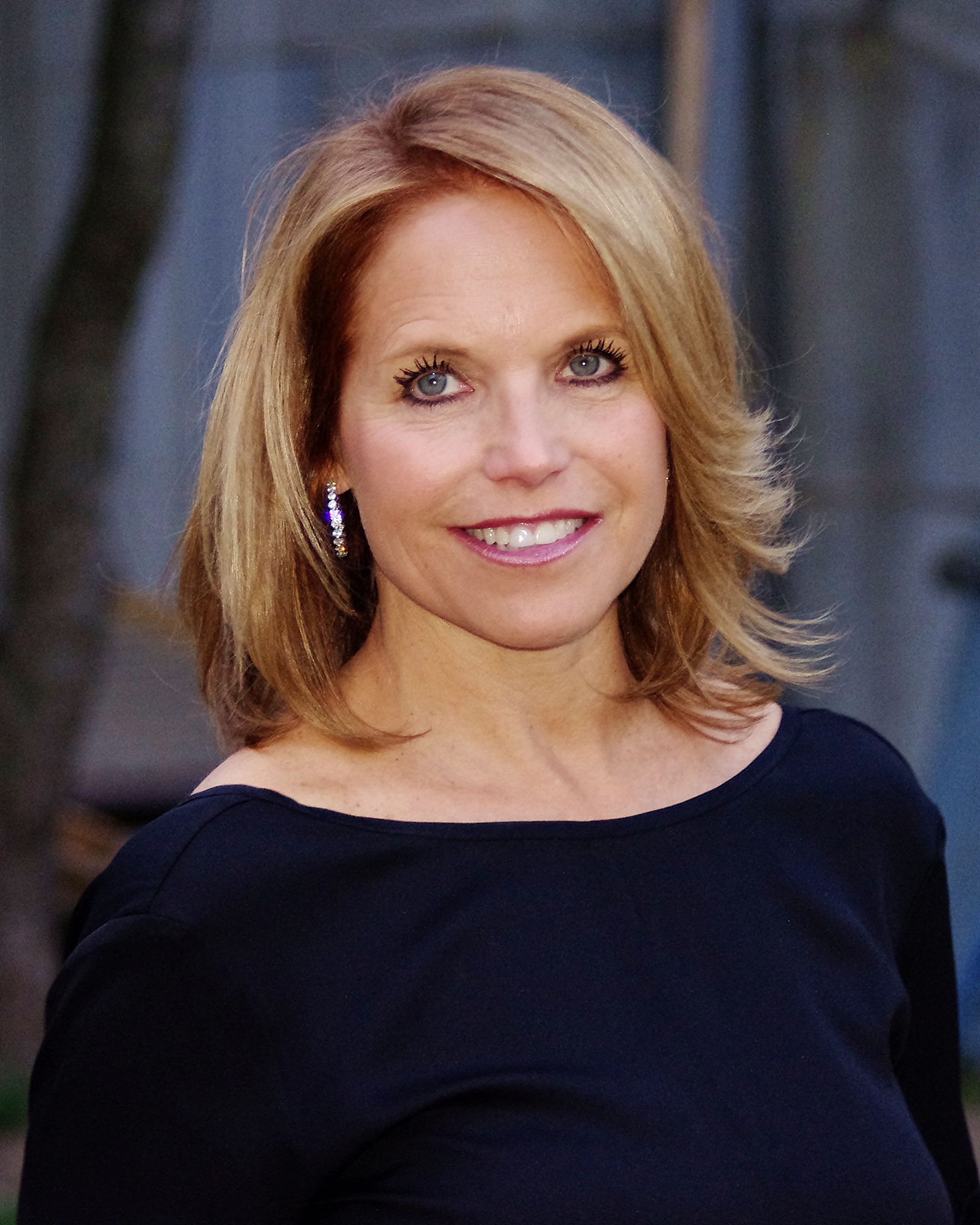
Katie Couric

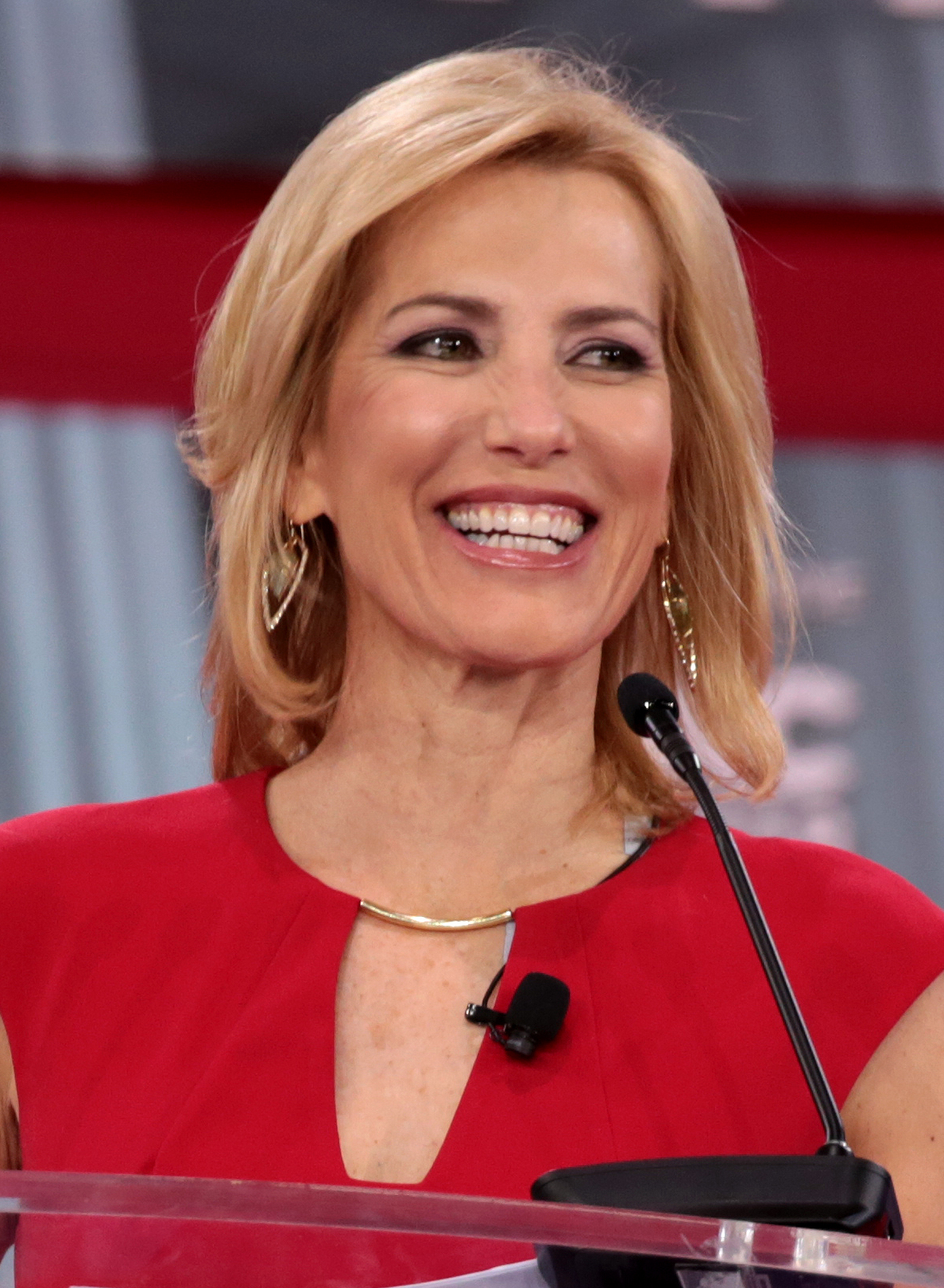
Laura Ingraham

Name	Class	School or degree	Notability	References
Robert Aldrich		Non-degreed	Film director, writer, and producer of The Dirty Dozen	
Will Anderson	2008	Col	Lead singer of the pop-rock band Parachute	
Krystal Ball	2003	Col	Anchor on MSNBC's The Cycle	
David Berman	1989	Col	Lead singer of indie-rock band Silver Jews	
John Brenkus	1993	Col	Host, ESPN's Sports Science	
Margaret Brennan	2002	Col	Bloomberg TV anchor, In Business with Margaret Brennan	
Edward Brophy		Col	Actor	
Coran Capshaw	1983	Col	Founder, Red Light Management; manager of the Dave Matthews Band, Faith Hill, and Alicia Keys	
Tom Cora		Col	Avant-garde cellist and composer	
Katie Couric	1979	Col	Anchor of CBS Evening News; former host of NBC's Today Show	
John Dickerson	1991	Col	Anchor of CBS News Prime Time with John Dickerson	
Deidre Downs		Non-degreed	Miss America 2005	
Kimberly Dozier	1993	Graduate	Reporter for CBS News	
Sarah Drew	2002	Col	Actress, Grey's Anatomy	
Tina Fey	1992	Col	Creator, writer, producer and actress, 30 Rock; former head writer, actress, Saturday Night Live	
Schuyler Fisk	2004	Col	Singer/songwriter	
Bob Gazzale	1987	Col	President, American Film Institute	
Jason George	1994	Col	Actor	
Brennan Gilmore	2001	Col	Bluegrass musician	
Richard Glatzer	1975	Graduate	Film director, producer, writer, Still Alice, The Fluffer, and Quinceañera	
Ann Hould-Ward	1978	Graduate	Broadway costume designer, Tony Award recipient	
Brit Hume	1965	Col	Managing editor, Fox News	
Laura Ingraham	1991	Law	Conservative talk show host	
Mark Johnson	1971	Col	Film producer, Rain Man, Good Morning, Vietnam, and The Chronicles of Narnia; Academy Award recipient	
Jen Lilley	2007	Col	Actress, General Hospital, Days of Our Lives, The Artist	
Jessica Lynch	2000	Col	Miss New York 2003	
Rod MacDonald	1970	Col	Singer/songwriter	
Stephen Malkmus	1988	Col	Lead singer of indie-rock band Pavement	
Tyler Mathisen	1976	Col	Co-anchor, Power Lunch; vice president for Strategic Editorial Initiatives, CNBC	
Benjamin McKenzie	2001	Col	Actor, Fox's The O.C.	
PES	1995	Col	Director, filmmaker, director of Oscar-nominated short film Fresh Guacamole	
Ed Romanoff		BA Communication	Singer-songwriter	
Andrew Scheinman	1973	Law	TV producer, Seinfeld; Emmy Award recipient	
Teddy Sears	1999	Col	Actor, Masters of Sex	
Tom Shadyac	1981	Col	Director, Ace Ventura: Pet Detective, Patch Adams, Bruce Almighty	
Melissa Stark	1995	Col	Reporter, ESPN and ABC's Monday Night Football	
Skipp Sudduth	1983	Graduate	actor	
Sean Patrick Thomas	1993	Col	Actor	
Boyd Tinsley			Violinist, mandolinist, backup vocals for Dave Matthews Band	
Dylan Walsh	1986	Col	Actor, Nip/Tuck	
Whitney Wegman-Wood		MFA	Actress, Kung Fu Ghost; screenwriter, The Last Butterflies	
Stan Winston	1968	Col	Special effects expert, four-time Academy Award recipient	
Paul Junger Witt	1963	Col	Emmy Award recipient; producer, Dead Poets Society; TV producer, The Golden Girls, The Partridge Family, Soap, Benson, and Blossom	
Vern Yip	1990	Col	Interior designer, HGTV home improvement personality	
Sasheer Zamata	2006	Col	Actor, Saturday Night Live	

=== Government ===
Name	Class	School or degree	Notability	References
Danny Avula		Col	Richmond-Henrico Health District commissioner; commissioner of Social Services of the Commonwealth of Virginia; mayor of Richmond, Virginia	
Gina Bennett			Central Intelligence Agency terrorism senior targeting analyst and senior advisor for the Directorate of Strategic Operational Planning at the National Counterterrorism Center	
James Laurence Cabell	1833		President of National Board of Health	
Mortimer Caplin	1940	Law	Internal Revenue Service commissioner	
James W. Carroll	1985	Col	Director of the Office of National Drug Control Policy	
Paul Ilyinsky	1953	Col	Three-term mayor of Palm Beach, Florida; descendant of Russian royalty	
Robert Mueller	1974	Law	Director of the Federal Bureau of Investigation	
Paul Craig Roberts		Ph.D.	Undersecretary of the treasury	
Thomas A. Scully	1979	Col	Administrator of the Centers for Medicare and Medicaid Services	
William A. Welch	1886	Graduate	General manager of the Palisades Interstate Park Commission	
Walter Wyatt	1917	Law	General counsel, Federal Reserve System	

=== Law ===
Name	Class	School or degree	Notability	References
Nathan L. Bachman	1903	Law	Justice, Tennessee Supreme Court; U.S. senator, Tennessee	
Daniel E. Burrows	2003	Col	Assistant attorney general for legal policy, U.S. Department of Justice; chief deputy attorney general of Kansas	
Millard F. Caldwell	1924	Law	State supreme court justice, Florida; governor, U.S. congressman	
Ken Cuccinelli	1990	BS Mechanical Engineering	Attorney general of Virginia	
Collins Denny Jr.	1924	Law	Pro-segregationist lawyer in Virginia	
Thomas Watt Gregory	1884	Law	Attorney general of the United States	
Mark Herring	1986	Graduate	Attorney general of Virginia, member of the Senate of Virginia	
Howell Edmunds Jackson	1854	Graduate	Justice, United States Supreme Court; U.S. senator of Tennessee	
Robert F. Kennedy	1951	Law	U.S. senator, New York; 1968 U.S. presidential candidate, U.S. attorney general	
Robert F. Kennedy Jr.	1982	Law	Chief prosecuting attorney, Riverkeeper; chairman, Waterkeeper Alliance; co-host of Ring of Fire, 26th U.S. secretary of health and human services	
Stephen N. Limbaugh Jr.	1988	Law	Missouri Supreme Court justice	
James Clark McReynolds	1884	Law	Justice, United States Supreme Court	
Andy Oldham	2001	Col	Judge on the United States Court of Appeals for the Fifth Circuit	
Ken Paxton	1991	Law	Attorney general of Texas	
Thomas Davis Ranson	1868	Law	Virginian lawyer and businessperson, veteran captain of the Confederate States Army serving under Gen. Stonewall Jackson	
Stanley Forman Reed	1908	Law	Justice, United States Supreme Court; U.S. solicitor general	
Chuck Rosenberg	1990	Law	United States attorney, Eastern District of Virginia and Southern District of Texas; former counsel to the FBI director; counselor to the US attorney general	
Benjamin Franklin Stringfellow	1835	Law	Missouri attorney general and Border Ruffian	
William M. Walton	1851	Law	Attorney general of Texas	
Sheldon Whitehouse	1982	Law	Attorney general of Rhode Island, United States senator from Rhode Island	

=== Literature and journalism ===
Name	Class	School or degree	Notability	References
Corban Addison	2004	Law	Author of A Walk Across the Sun	
Susanne Antonetta	1989	MFA	Poet and author	
Taylor Antrim	2004	MFA	Novelist	
Amy Argetsinger	1990	Col	Writer and editor at the Washington Post	
Louis Auchincloss	1941	Law	Novelist, lawyer, National Book Award for Fiction finalist	
David Baldacci	1986	Law	Novelist, Memory Man, The Camel Club, Total Control	
Fred Barnes	1965	Col	Editor, The Weekly Standard	
Sandra Beasley	2002	Col	Poet and writer, 2009 Barnard Women Poets Prize	
Jamelle Bouie	2009	Col	Columnist for the New York Times, Forbes 30 under 30 2015	
Paul Bowles		Non-degreed	Novelist, travel writer, composer, author of The Sheltering Sky, Up Above the World	
Michael P. Branch		MA, Ph.D	Ecocritic, writer, and activist	
William Cabell Bruce	1880	Col	1918 Pulitzer Prize winner in biography	
Oni Buchanan	1997	Col	Poet, National Poetry Series winner 2007	
Erskine Caldwell		Non-degreed	Novelist, author of Tobacco Road	
Virginius Dabney		Col	Editor of Richmond Times Dispatch, author, Pulitzer Prize winner	
Kyle Dargan	2002	Col	Poet, 2019 Lenore Marshall Poetry Prize	
Laura Dave	2003	MFA	Novelist, The Last Thing He Told Me	
Philip F. Deaver	1978	Graduate	Writer and poet	
Lane DeGregor	1989, 1995	Col, graduate	Pulitzer Prize–winning journalist	
Heather Derr-Smith	1995	Col	Poet	
Tyler Drumheller	1974	Col	Pre-Iraq war European CIA station chief; author of On the Brink	
Emma Copley Eisenberg	2014	MFA	Author of The Third Rainbow Girl	
Claudia Emerson	1979	Col	2006 Pulitzer Prize winner for poetry, 2008 Poet Laureate of Virginia	
Linda Fairstein	1972	Law	Prosecutor of sex crimes in Manhattan; best-selling author of crime novels	
Richard Foerster	1972	Col	Poet	
Thomas Frank	1987	Col	Founder and editor, The Baffler	
William Fuller	1983	Ph.D.	Poet; senior vice president and chief fiduciary officer of Northern Trust Corporation	
Ted Genoways	1999	MFA	Writer, journalist, author	
Emily Giffin	1997	Law	Author	
W. Douglas Gordon	1898	Law	Editor, Norfolk Ledger-Dispatch and Richmond Times-Dispatch	
David M. Granger	1981	Graduate	Editor-in-chief of Esquire	
Julien Green	1922	Col	Major figure of French literature of the 20th century	
Chad Harbach	2004	MFA	Novelist, author of The Art of Fielding	
Vashti Harrison	2010	Col	Children's book writer, illustrator, filmmaker, and illustrator of Sulwe	
Bernard Holland		Col	Former chief music critic for The New York Times	
Philip K. Howard	1974	Law	Writer, author of Life without Lawyers	
Edward P. Jones	1981	Graduate	Author, winner of 2004 Pulitzer Prize for fiction, MacArthur Fellow	
Mary Beth Keane	2005	MFA	Novelist	
Jack T. Kirby		MA, Ph.D	Historian of the Southern United States, awarded the Bancroft Prize for his 2006 book Mockingbird Song	
Melissa Kirsch	1996	Col	Author, assistant editor, culture and lifestyle at New York Times	
Christina Baker Kline	1990	MFA	Novelist	
Jeb Livingood	2000	MFA	Poet	
Emma Lord	2012	Col	Author	
Rich Lowry	1990	Col	Editor-in-chief, National Review	
Erika Meitner		MFA, MA	Poet, National Book Award Ffinalist 2018 for poetry	
Daniel Mendelsohn	1982	Col	Writer and columnist, author of The Lost: A Search for Six of Six Million, professor at Bard College	
Lulu Miller	2013	MFA	Writer and Peabody Award-winning science reporter for NPR	
Robert Miskimon		Non-degreed	Novelist, journalist, poet	
Adam Mitzner	1989	Law	Novelist, recipient of Silver Gavel Award	
Arthur D. Morse			Print and television journalist, author of While Six Million Died: A Chronicle of American Apathy	
David Nolan	1967	Col	Author and historian	
Nikki Ogunnaike	2007	Col	Editor-in-chief of Marie Claire, former senior digital director of Harper's Bazaar	
Breece D'J Pancake		Non-degreed	Short-story writer	
Kiki Petrosino	2001	Col	Poet	
Hannah Pittard	2007	MFA	Novelist	
Edgar Allan Poe		Non-degreed	Poet, "father of Gothic literature", author of "The Raven", "The Tell-Tale Heart"	
Sarah Posner	1990	Law	Writer and journalist	
Margot Lee Shetterly	1991	Comm	Non-fiction writer, author of Hidden Figures	
Will Shortz	1977	Law	Editor of The New York Times crossword puzzle	
Safiya Sinclair	2014	MFA	Poet	
Jens Söring		Non-degreed	Autobiographer and writer of social issues, convicted murderer without parole	
Lisa Russ Spaar	1978, 1982	Col, MFA	Poet, Pushcart Prize, Guggenheim Fellowship for the creative arts, professor at University of Virginia	
William Force Stead	1905	Col	Poet and chaplain of Worcester College, Oxford	
Darcey Steinke		MFA	Author	
Sheryl Gay Stolberg	1983	Col	Journalist for the New York Times	
Ron Suskind	1981	Col	Pulitzer Prize-winning journalist, author	
Aoibheann Sweeney	2000	MGA	Novelist, author of Among Other Things, I've Taken Up Smoking	
Henry S. Taylor	1964	Col	Novelist, 1986 Pulitzer Prize for Poetry, The Flying Change	
Evan Thomas	1977	Law	Author, journalist, historian, editor at Newsweek, author of The Wise Men	
Samantha Thornhill	2004	MFA	Poet	
Jia Tolentino	2009	Col	Writer and editor, author of Trick Mirror: Reflections on Self-Delusion, staff writer at The New Yorker	
Michael Vitez	1979	Col	Staff writer, The Philadelphia Inquirer, Pulitzer Prize winner	
Helen Wan	1998	Law	Novelist, lawyer, author of Partner Track	
Tia Williams	1997	Col	Novelist, editor	
Theodore Wong	Did not graduate		Translator	
Jenna Wortham	2004	Col	Author and journalist, culture writer at the New York Times, Black Futures	

=== Medicine ===
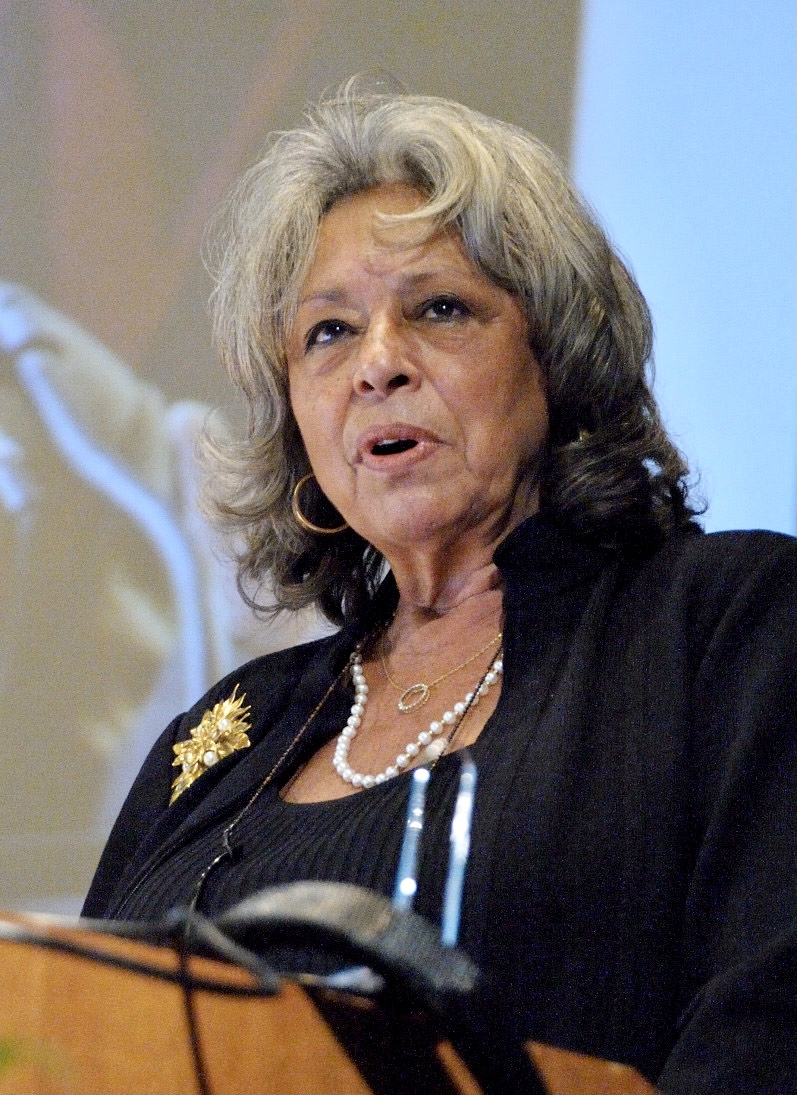
Vivian Pinn

Name	Class	School or degree	Notability	References
Rupert Blue	1890	Co	Surgeon general of the United States	
S. Ward Casscells	1939	Medicine	Pioneering orthopedic surgeon, introduced arthroscopy of the knee joint into practice in the United States	
Francis Collins	1970	Col	Director of the Human Genome Project; past director, National Institute of Health	
Hugh S. Cumming	1893	Medicine	Surgeon general of the United States	
Lisa L. Cunningham		Ph.D.	National Institute on Deafness and Other Communication Disorders scientific director	
David John Doukas	1975	Col	Clinical bioethics scholar, family physician	
Charles T. Pepper	1855	Medicine	Physician who was the original "Dr. Pepper", according to the Dr Pepper Company	
Vivian Pinn	1967	Medicine	Former associate director for research on women's health at the National Institutes of Health	
Walter Reed	1869	Medicine	Medical researcher; discovered transmission of yellow fever	
Beverly R. Wellford	1816	Medicine	Sixth president of the American Medical Association	
Hugh H. Young	1891	Medicine	Inventor, author, pioneering surgeon	

=== Military ===
Name	Class	School or degree	Notability	References
Fernando Bolivar			Venezuelan military, nephew of General Simon Bolivar	
Richard E. Byrd		Non-degreed	Naval officer, pioneering aviator, polar explorer	
W. Graham Claytor Jr.	1933	Col	U.S. secretary of the Navy; president, Southern Railway and Amtrak	
Philip St. George Cocke	1828		Brigadier general in the Confederate States Army during the American Civil War	
Hilary A. Herbert	1855	Law	Secretary of the Navy	
Eppa Hunton	1843	Law	CSA brigadier general; U.S. congressman and U.S. senator, Virginia	
Robert Magnus	1969	Col	United States Marine Corps four-star general	
John B. Magruder		Non-degreed	Confederate Army general during the Civil War	
John Morgan	1972	Col	Vice admiral in the United States Navy	
John S. Mosby	Attended 1850–1853		Confederate army cavalry battalion commander in the American Civil War	
Charles Pede	1984, 1987	Col, Law	United States Army lieutenant general, Judge Advocate General of the United States Army	
William Pegram		Law	Artillery officer in the Confederate Army of Northern Virginia during the American Civil War	
Carnot Posey		Law	Confederate general in the American Civil War	
George W. Randolph	1842	Law	Confederate States secretary of war	
James Seddon	1836	Graduate	4th Confederate States secretary of war	
Alexander Vandegrift	Attended 1906–1908	Col	Commandant of the Marine Corps, Medal of Honor recipient	
John Augustine Washington III	1840		Confederate lieutenant colonel and the last member of the Washington family to own Mount Veron	

=== Politics ===
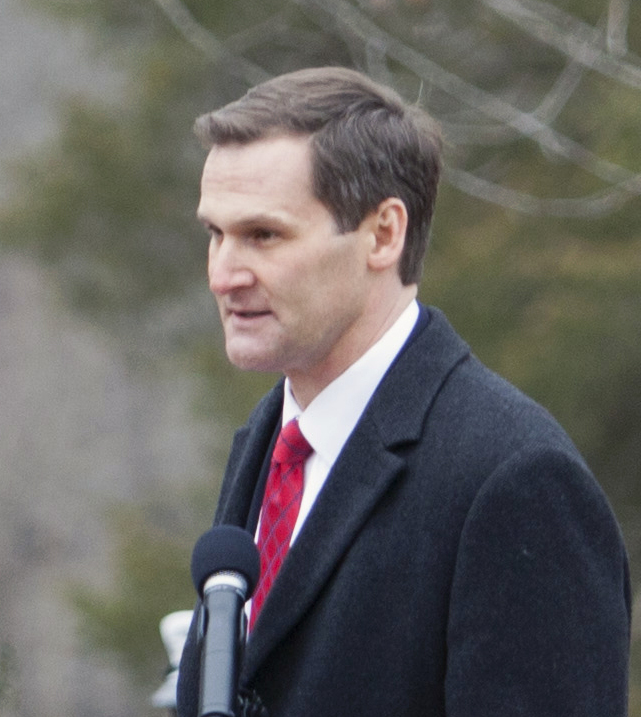
Michael Signer

Name	Class	School or degree	Notability	References
Yasushi Akashi	1956	Graduate	Chairman, International House of Japan; former undersecretary of the United Nations	
George Allen	1974, 1977	Col, Law	Governor and U.S. senator, Virginia	
Hanan Ashrawi	1982	Graduate	Official spokesperson of the Palestinian Delegation to the Middle East Peace Process	
Nathan L. Bachman	1903	Law	U.S. senator, Tennessee; justice, Tennessee Supreme Court	
Alben W. Barkley	1900	Law	35th vice president of the United States; U.S. senator, Kentucky	
Evan Bayh	1981	Law	U.S. senator and governor, Indiana	
Andy Beshear	2005	Law	Governor of Kentucky	
Kit Bond	1963	Law	U.S. senator, Missouri	
Alan Stephenson Boyd	1948	Law	First U.S. secretary of transportation	
Harry F. Byrd Jr.	1936	Law	U.S. senator, Virginia	
Millard F. Caldwell	1924	Law	Governor, U.S. congressman, and state supreme court justice, Florida	
Greg Casar	2012	Col	U.S. congressman, Texas	
James Paul Clarke	1878	Law	United States senator and the 18th governor of Arkansas	
John Cornyn	1995	Law	U.S. senator, Texas	
Joseph T. Curry			Member of the Louisiana House of Representatives	
William H. Daingerfield	1829	Col	2nd mayor of San Antonio; ambassador	
Henry Winter Davis	1841	Law	Outspoken Radical Republican; U.S. congressman, Maryland	
Mary DeRosa	1981	Col	Former deputy counsel to the president for National Security Affairs in the Obama Administration	
Hasjim Djala	1959	Law	Indonesian ambassador to Germany, Canada, and the United Nations; chairman and president of the International Seabed Authority	
Joseph T. Doyle	1990	Graduate	Pennsylvania state representative	
William A. Eaton	1978	Col	United States ambassador to Panama, United States assistant secretary of state	
Paul Erickson	1988	Law	Political consultant	
William Stamps Farish III	1962	Col	U.S. ambassador to the United Kingdom	
William Meade Fishback	1855	Law	17th governor of Arkansas and U.S. senator, Arkansas	
Luis Fortuño	1985	Law	Governor of Puerto Rico	
James S. Gilmore III	1971, 1977	Col, Law	Governor of Virginia and Chairman of the Republican National Committee	
Michael E. Guest	1981	Graduate	U.S. ambassador to Romania; first openly gay man to be confirmed by the U.S. Senate and serve as a U.S. ambassador	
Barbara Halliday			Mayor of Hayward, California	
Mark Herring	1986	Graduate	Attorney general of Virginia, member of the Senate of Virginia	
Yan Huiqing	1900	Col	Premier and prime minister of the Republic of China; Chinese Ambassador to the United States; Chinese ambassador to the Soviet Union; Chinese representative in the League of Nations	
Robert M. T. Hunter	1829	Col	Speaker of the United States House of Representatives and U.S. senator, Virginia	
Eppa Hunton	1843	Law	CSA brigadier general; U.S. congressman and U.S. senator, Virginia	
Louis A. Johnson	1913	Law	Second U.S. secretary of defense	
Brereton Jones	1961	Communication	Governor of Kentucky	
John Kennedy	1977	Law	U.S. senator, Louisiana, state treasurer of Louisiana	
Robert F. Kennedy	1951	Law	U.S. senator, New York; 1968 U.S. presidential candidate, U.S. attorney general	
Ted Kennedy	1959	Law	U.S. senator, Massachusetts	
Angus King	1969	Law	72nd governor of Maine, United States senator from Maine	
William Preston Lane Jr.	1915	Law	Governor, Maryland	
J. Hamilton Lewis			U.S. senator, Illinois and first whip	
Sean Patrick Maloney	1988, 1992	Col, Law	U.S. congressman, New York's 18th congressional district and former White House Office of the Staff secretary	
Thurgood Marshall Jr.	1978, 1981	Col, Law	Former White House cabinet secretary	
Roy Martin		Commerce	Mayor of Norfolk, Virginia (1962–1974), 31st president of the United States Conference of Mayors	
Henry M. Mathews	1856	Graduate	Governor of West Virginia	
Jennifer McClellan	1997	Law	U.S. congresswoman, Virginia's 4th congressional district	
Samuel D. McEnery	1857	Col	Governor and U.S. senator for Louisiana, United States House of Representatives	
Ana Montes	1979	Col	Convicted Cuban spy	
Janet Napolitano	1983	Law	Governor of Arizona, secretary of Homeland Security, president of the University of California System	
Bill Nelson	1968	Law	U.S. senator, Florida; NASA astronaut	
Kirstjen Nielsen	1999	Law	6th secretary of the United States Department of Homeland Security	
Longin Pastusiak	1959	Graduate	Marshall of the Senate, Poland	
Thomas Caute Reynolds	1838	Law	11th lieutenant governor of Missouri; governor of Missouri (Confederate)	
Chuck Robb	1973	Law	Governor of Virginia and U.S. senator	
Joseph T. Robinson	1895	Law	Governor of Arkansas and United States Senate majority leader	
Franklin D. Roosevelt Jr.	1940	Law	U.S. congressman, New York	
Chip Roy	1994	Commerce	U.S. congressman, Texas's 21st congressional district	
Mark Sanford	1988	Darden	Governor of South Carolina	
Eugene Scalia	1985	Col	28th U.S. secretary of labor	
George Schley	1833	Col	Maryland State Senate, Maryland House of Delegates, and Maryland Constitutional Convention of 1850	
Faryar Shirzad	1992	Law	Advisor to United States President George W. Bush	
Marc Short	2004	Darden	White House director of Legislative Affairs	
Michael Signer		Law	Mayor of Charlottesville, Virginia	
John W. Snow	1965	Graduate	U.S. secretary of the treasury	
Javier Solana	1968	Graduate	Spanish former secretary general of the North Atlantic Treaty Organization and previous European Union foreign policy chief	
Abigail Spanberger	2001	Col	U.S. congresswoman, governor of Virginia	
Richard B. Spencer	2001	Col	Neo-Nazi, White nationalist, founder of AlternativeRight.com, president and director of the National Policy Institute	
William B. Spong Jr.	1947	Law	U.S. senator, Virginia	
John C. Stennis	1928	Law	U.S. senator, Mississippi	
Edward Stettinius Jr.	1924	Col	U.S. secretary of state	
Robert M. Switzer		Law	United States representative	
Charles L. Terry Jr.	1922	Col	Governor of Delaware	
Robert Toombs	1830	Law	U.S. senator, Georgia	
John V. Tunney	1959	Law	U.S. congressman and U.S. senator, California	
Thomas B. Turley	1867	Law	U.S. senator, Tennessee	
John Warner	1953	Law	U.S. senator, Virginia	
Mac Warner	1991	Law	Secretary of state of West Virginia	
Lowell P. Weicker Jr.	1957	Law	Governor of Connecticut, U.S. congressman, and U.S. senator	
Kevin Whitaker	1979	Col	United States ambassador to Colombia	
Sheldon Whitehouse	1982	Law	United States senator from Rhode Island, attorney general of Rhode Island	
John Sharp Williams	1876	Law	Minority leader of the United States House of Representatives	
Wayne W. Williams	1989	Law	Secretary of state of Colorado	
Woodrow Wilson		Non-degreed	28th president of the United States	

=== Religion ===
Name	Class	School or degree	Notability	References
Charles Augustus Briggs	1860	Col	Hebrew scholar and theologian	
Lloyd R. Craighill			Second bishop of Anking, China	
Carl P. Daw Jr.		MA, Ph.D	Executive director of the Hymn Society in the United States and Canada	
Collins Denny		Graduate	Bishop of the Methodist Episcopal Church, South (1910–1939)	
James Addison Ingle	1885, 1888	BA, MA	First bishop of the Missionary District of Hankow, China	
J. William Jones	1859		Confederate chaplain, campus minister, Christian author	

=== Science and technology ===
Name	Class	School or degree	Notability	References
John Backus		Non-degreed	Inventor of first high-level programming language, FORTRAN, and recipient of the 1977 A.M. Turing Award	
Daniel Barringer	1888	Graduate	Proved the existence of meteorites on Earth (Barringer Meteorite Crater)	
Jesse Beams	1926	Graduate	One of five primary physicists selected for the Manhattan Project, pioneer of ultracentrifuge	
Robin Isadora Brown	2024	Ph.D.	Characterization of Peripheral Satellite Glial Cells and Their Effects on Axon Regrowth Following Injury in a Zebrafish Developmental Model, and known for queer history activism.	
Norman L. Crabill	1957	Master of Aeronautical Engineering	Engineer, inventor, author	
Heber Doust Curtis	1902	Graduate	Astronomer who participated in the "Great Debate" with Harlow Shapley, 1920	
Patrick G. Forrester	1989	Graduate	NASA astronaut	
Matthew P. Hardy	1985	Ph.D. Biology	Reproductive biologist who has made fundamental contributions in Leydig cell differentiation and function	
Wesley L. Harris	1964	Engineering	Professor at MIT; vice president of National Academy of Engineering	
Karl G. Henize	1947, 1948	Col, graduate	Astronomer, NASA astronaut	
Thomas Marshburn	1984	Engineering	NASA astronaut	
Janet Akyüz Mattei	1972	Graduate	Astronomer; director, American Association of Variable Star Observers	
Leland Melvin	1991	Engineering	NASA astronaut	
Bill Nelson	1968	Law	NASA astronaut; U.S. senator, Florida	
Edward P. Ney	1946	Ph.D	Astrophysicist; discovered heavy cosmic ray nuclei	
Haller Nutt		Non-degreed	Developer of the Egypto-Mexican cotton hybrid	
Charles Pollard Olivier	1911	Graduate	Astronomer; founder, American Meteor Society	
Gregory Olsen	1971	Graduate	Third private citizen to make a self-funded trip to the International Space Station	
Phil Plait	1994	Graduate	Author of Bad Astronomy and Bad Astronomy blog	
Kathryn C. Thornton	1977, 1979	Graduate	NASA astronaut	
Ann M. Valentine	1993	BS	Inorganic chemist	
Alexander N. Vyssotsky	1927	Graduate	Astronomer; cataloged Milky Way M dwarf stars	
Thomas W. Whitaker	1929, 1931	MS, Ph.D	Botanist and horticulturist	
Ralph Elmer Wilson	1910	Graduate	Astronomer; Wilson crater on the Moon was co-named after him	
Carl A. Wirtanen	1939	Graduate	Astronomer; discovered a number of asteroida and comets	
Peter Wisoff	1980	Col	NASA astronaut; engineering professor at Rice University	

=== Sports ===
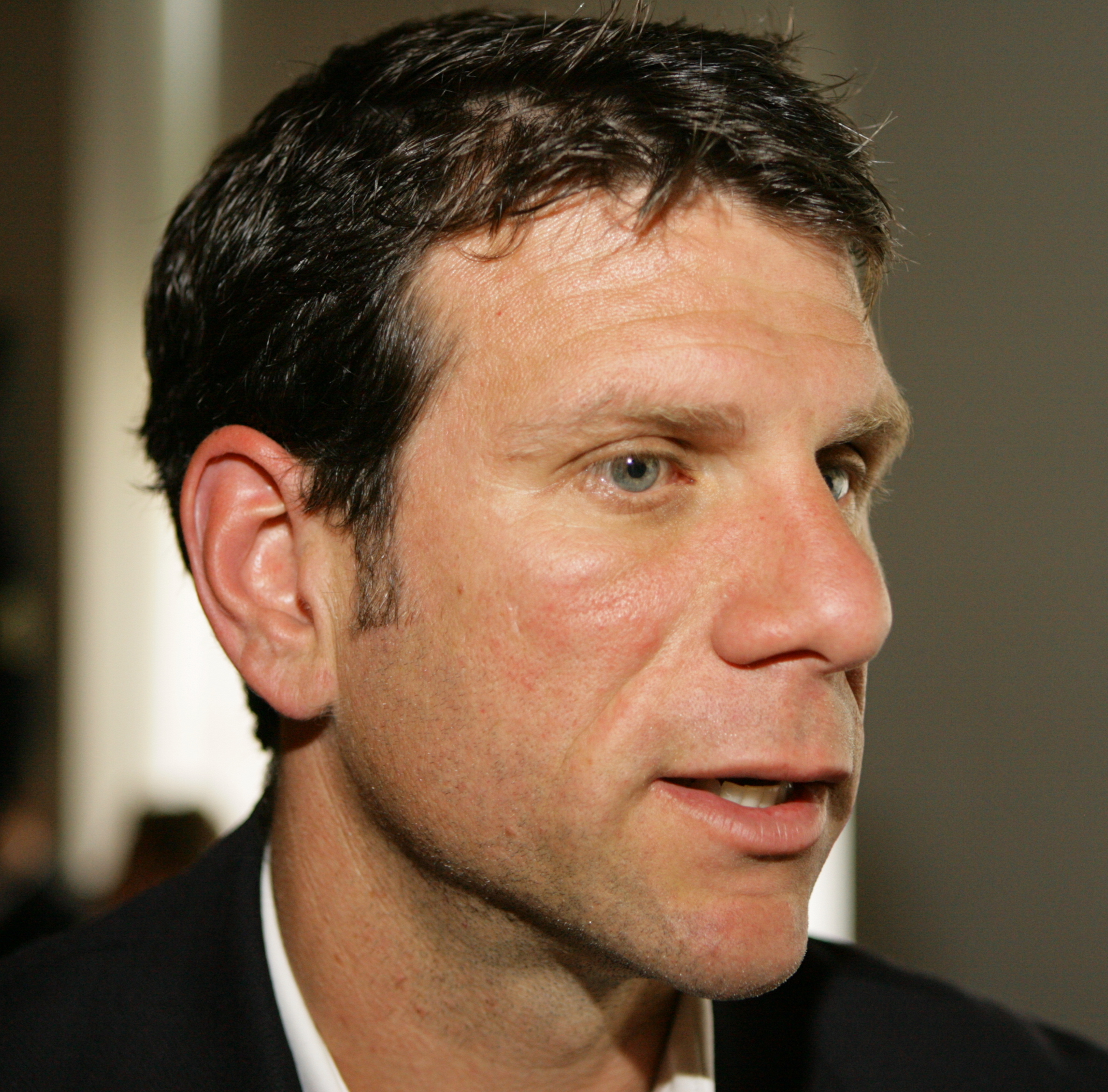
Jeff Agoos

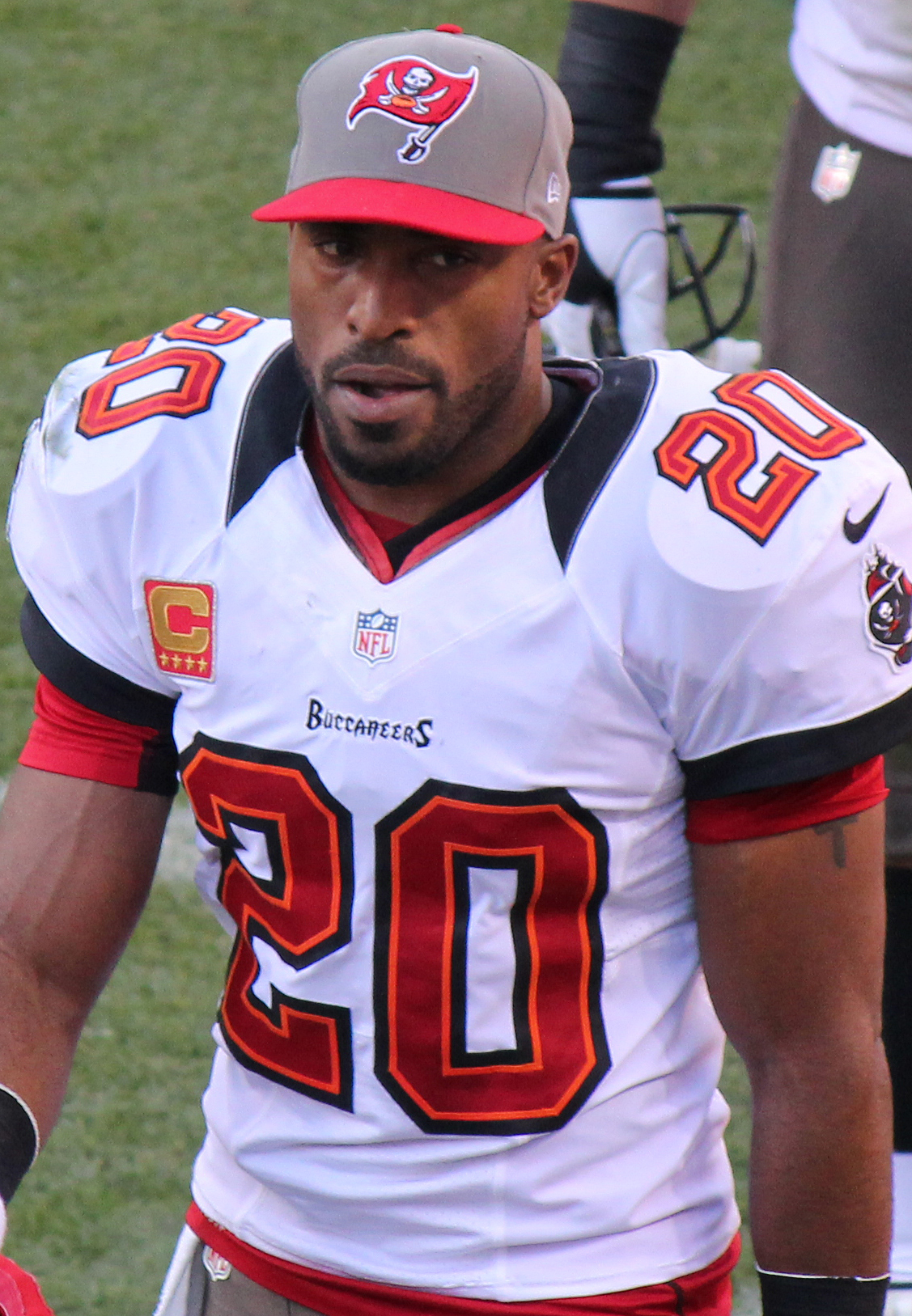
Ronde Barber

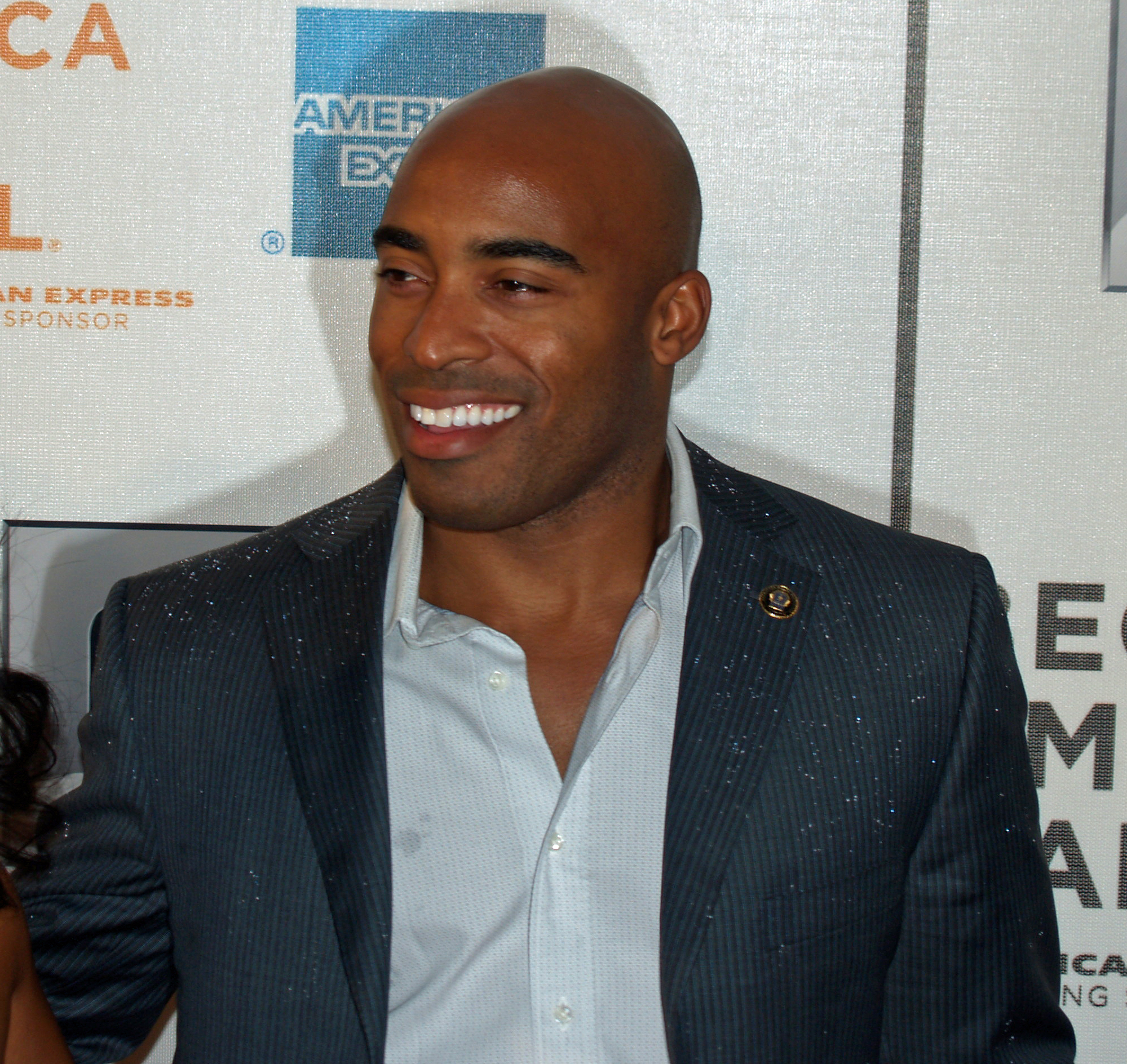
Tiki Barber

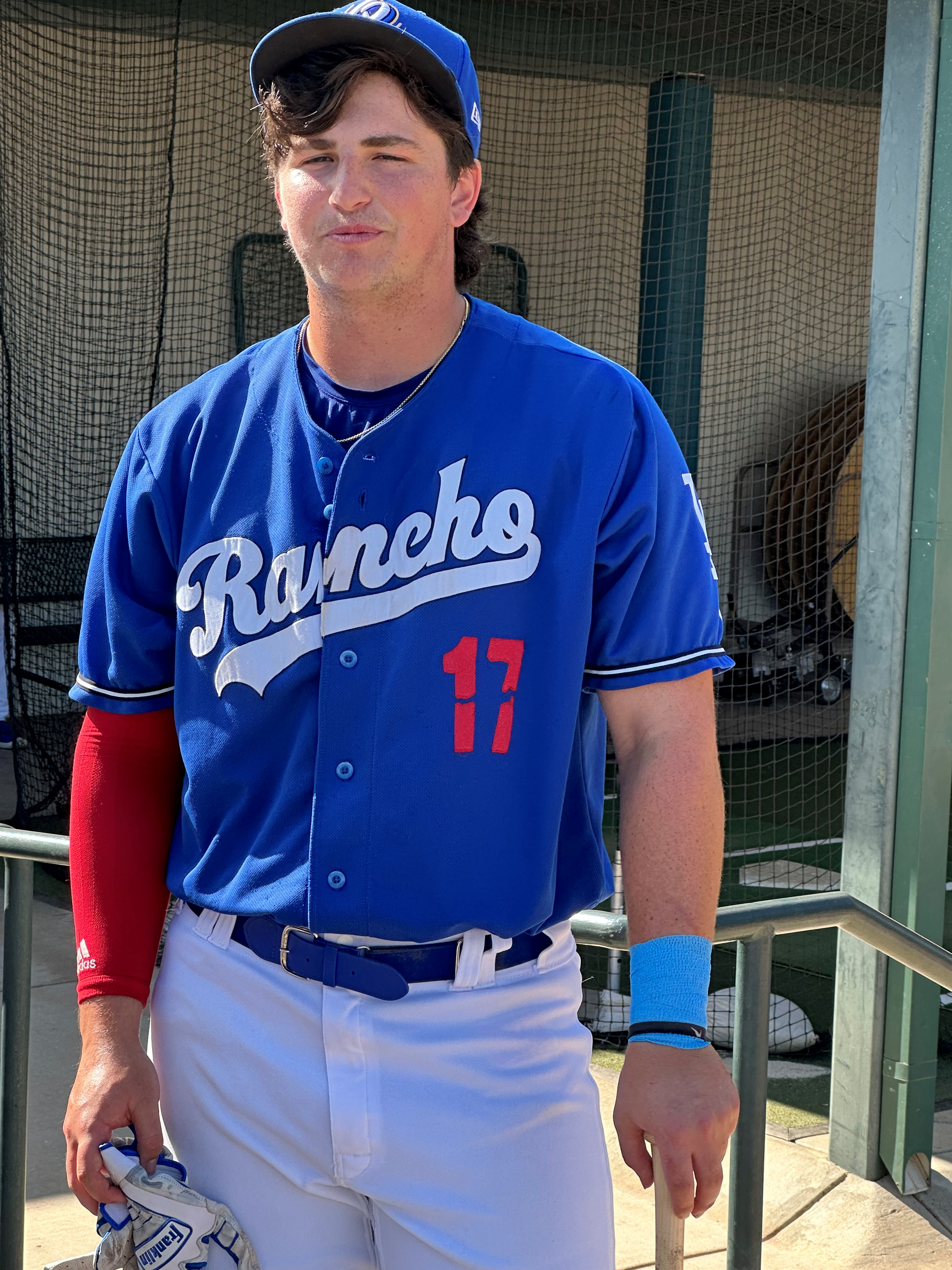
Jake Gelof

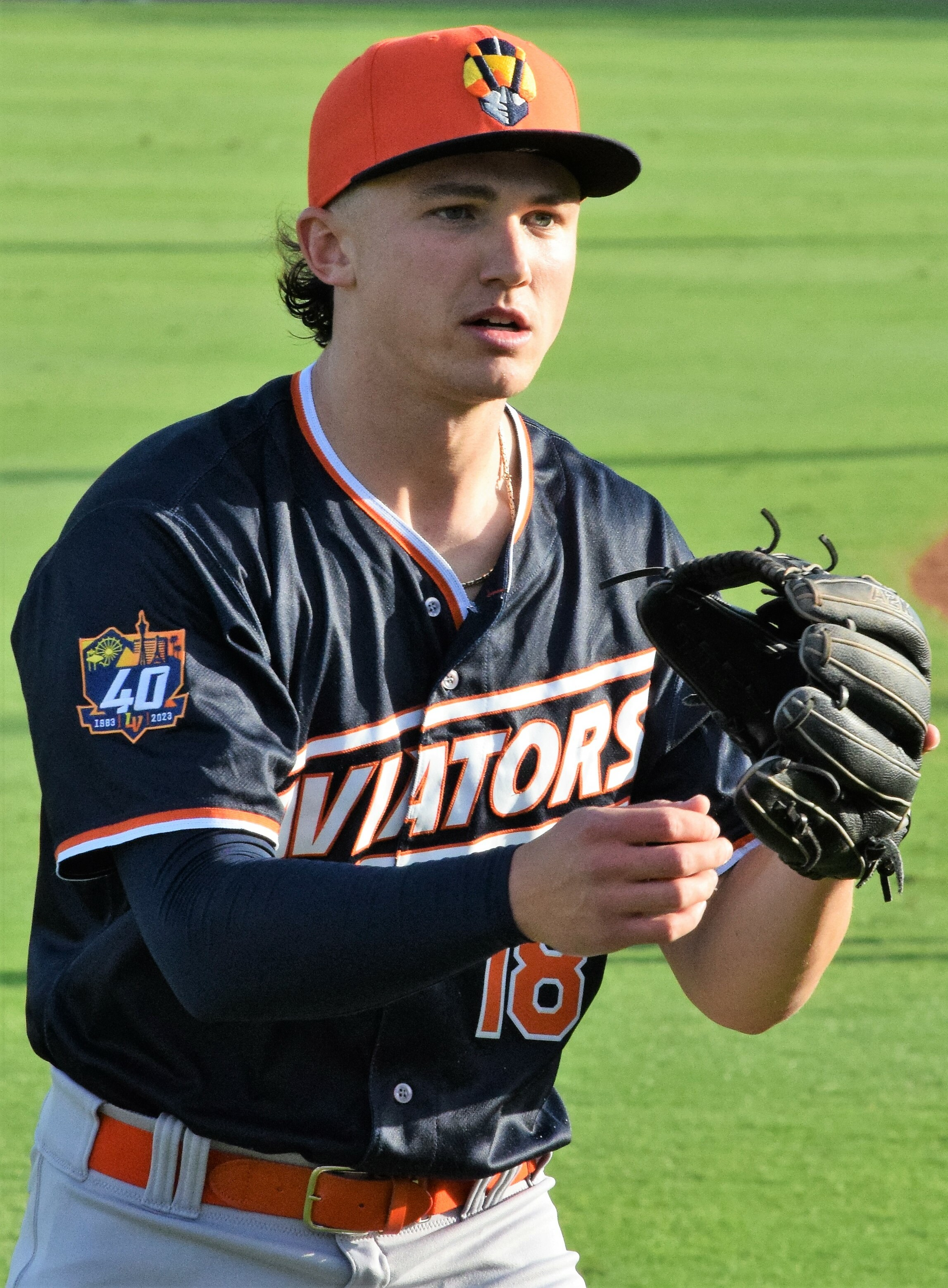
Zack Gelof

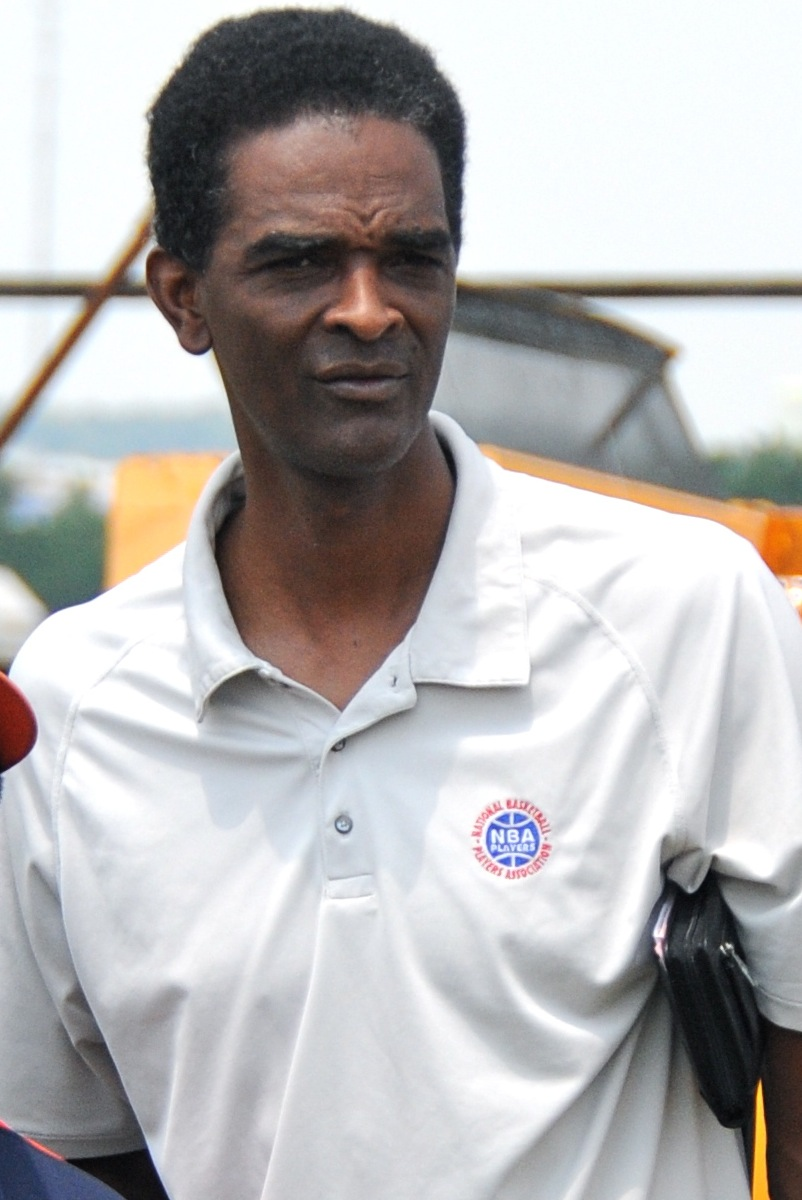
Ralph Sampson

Name	Class	School or degree	Notability	References
Val Ackerman	1981	Col	Founder and former president of WNBA, and current commissioner of the Big East Conference	
Jeff Agoos	1990		Swiss–born American soccer defender	
Cory Alexander	1995	Col	Professional basketball player with the NBA	
Darion Atkins	2015		Professional basketball player for Hapoel Holon of the Israeli Basketball Premier League	
Ronde Barber	1996	Communication	Professional football player with Tampa Bay Buccaneers	
Tiki Barber	1997	Communication	Professional football player with the New York Giants; current sportscaster	
Malcolm Brogdon	2016		Professional basketball player with the Washington Wizards	
Heather Burge			Professional basketball player with the WNBA	
Heidi Burge	1993	Col	Professional basketball player with the WNBA	
Chris Canty	2004	Col	Professional football player	
Rick Carlisle	1984	Col	Professional football player; current head coach, Dallas Mavericks	
John Choma	1970		Professional football player with the San Francisco 49ers	
Casey Crawford			Professional football player	
Mike Cubbage			Professional baseball player and manager	
Virginius Dabney			College football player and coach	
Somdev Devvarman	2008	Col	Professional tennis player	
Mamadi Diakite	2020		Professional basketball player	
Daryl Dike			Professional soccer player and U.S. men's national team player	
Bill Dudley	1942	Education	Professional football player and NFL Hall of Fame	
Jeffrey Eggleston	2007		Long-distance runner	
Carlton Elliott			Professional football layer with the Green Bay Packers	
Paul Ereng	1993	Col	1988 Summer Olympics gold medalist in 800 meters	
Alecko Eskandarian		Col	Major League Soccer #1 overall draft pick, player with D.C. United and U.S. national team	
Mustapha Farrakhan Jr.			Professional basketball player	
D'Brickashaw Ferguson	2006	Col	Professional football player with the New York Jets	
Tim Finchem	1973		Commissioner of the PGA Tour	
Morgan Gautrat	2014		Professional soccer player and member of the US Women's National Soccer Team	
Jake Gelof			Professional baseball player	
Zack Gelof			Professional baseball player	
Conor Gill	2002	Col	Major League Lacrosse Rookie of the Year Award; 2002	
Robert Kent Gooch			College football player	
Jim Grobe	1975, 1978		Head coach of the Wake Forest Demon Deacons football team	
Al Groh	1967	Communications	Former head coach of New York Jets, former head coach of Virginia football team	
Margaret Groos			1988 U.S. Olympic trial marathon winner; former world indoor record holder for 5,000 meters	
Kyle Guy			Professional basketball player with the Sacramento Kings	
Brandon Guyer			Professional baseball player with the Tampa Bay Rays	
Darryl Hammond	1988	Col	Professional Arena Football League player	
John Harkes			Professional soccer player and coach	
Joe Harris	2014		Professional basketball player	
Adam Haseley			Professional baseball player with the Chicago White Sox	
DeAndre Hunter			Professional basketball player Atlanta Hawks	
Ty Jerome			Professional basketball player with the Phoenix Suns	
Mike Jones			Professional wrestler under the names Virgil, Vincent, and Curly Moe	
Thomas Jones			Professional football player with the Kansas City Chiefs	
Henry Jordan			Professional football player and Pro Football Hall of Fame member	
Braxton Key			Professional basketball player	
Melanie Kok			2008 Summer Olympics silver medalist in rowing	
Joe Koshansky			Professional baseball player	
Bowie Kuhn	1950	Law	Former commissioner of Major League Baseball	
Noel LaMontagne			Professional football player	
Jeff Lamp			Professional basketball player	
Sylven Landesberg			Professional basketball player	
Lesley Lehane			Winner of the NCAA and TAC National Championships in cross-country in 1982	
Chris Long			Professional football player	
Javier López			Professional baseball player with the San Francisco Giants	
John Loyd			College football player and team captain	
Wali Lundy			Professional football player	
Buck Mayer			College football player and College Football All-America Team	
Tony Meola	1989	Col	Professional soccer player and World Cup goalkeeper	
Jerome Meyinsse	2010		Professional basketball player with the Israeli Basketball Premier League	
Heath Miller	2004	Col	Professional football player with the Pittsburgh Steelers	
Eugene Monroe	2008	Col	Professional football player with the Jacksonville Jaguars	
Herman Moore	1991	Col	Professional football player	
Shawn Moore			Former NFL and CFL player, All–American at UVA	
Ed Moses	2004	Education	Olympic gold medalist in swimming	
Trey Murphy III			Professional basketball player	
Bret Myers	2006	MS	Professional soccer player	
Ben Olsen		Non-degreed	Professional soccer player and coach with the D.C. United	
London Perrantes			Professional basketball player with the Israeli Basketball Premier League	
John Phillips			Professional football player	
Shamek Pietucha	1999	Col	Olympic swimmer	
John Beverly Pollard			College football player and coach	
Sonny Randle	1958		Professional football player	
Claudio Reyna		Non-degreed	Professional soccer player and captain of U.S. national team	
LaRoy Reynolds			Professional football player with the Atlanta Falcons	
Mark Reynolds			Professional baseball player with the St. Louis Cardinals	
Eppa Rixey	1912	Col	Professional baseball player and National Baseball Hall of Fame member	
Chris Rotelli	2003		Professional lacrosse player	
Jake Rozhansky			Professional soccer player	
Ralph Sampson	1983	Col	NBA #1 draft pick, professional basketball player, Naismith Memorial Basketball Hall of Fame	
Becky Sauerbrunn			Professional soccer player and member of the US women's national team	
Matt Schaub	2003	Col	Professional football player with the Houston Texans	
Michael Schwimer	2008		Professional baseball player with the Philadelphia Phillies	
Mike Scott			Professional basketball player	
Marial Shayok			Basketball player in the NBA and the Israeli Premier Basketball League	
Don Shula			Professional football head coach of the Baltimore Colts and Miami Dolphins	
Chris Slade	1993	Col	Professional football player with the New England Patriots	
Michael Slive	1965	Law	Former commissioner of the Southeastern Conference (SEC)	
Devin Smith			Professional basketball player	
Emily Sonnett	2015	Col	Professional soccer player and member of the US women's national team	
Dawn Staley	1992	Col	2004 Summer Olympics gold medalist, college basketball coach, Naismith Memorial Basketball Hall of Fame	
Chris Taylor			Professal baseball player with the Los Angeles Dodgers	
Bradley Walker			College football coach and referee	
DeMya Walker	1999	Col	Professional basketball player	
George Welsh			College football player and coach	
Ralph C. Wilson Jr.			Founding owner of the Buffalo Bills, namesake of Ralph Wilson Stadium	
Monica Wright	2010	Col	Professional basketball player	
Ryan Zimmerman	2005	Col	Professional baseball player with the Washington Nationals	

=== Other ===
Name	Class	School or degree	Notability	References
Jason Kessler	2009	Col	Neo-Nazi, white supremacist	
Ginnie Sebastian Storage		BA	47th president general of the Daughters of the American Revolution	
Otto Warmbier			College student imprisoned in North Korea in 2016 on a charge of subversion	

== Notable faculty and staff ==
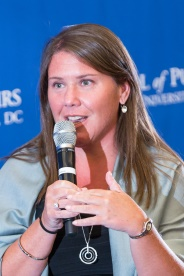
Jennifer Lawless

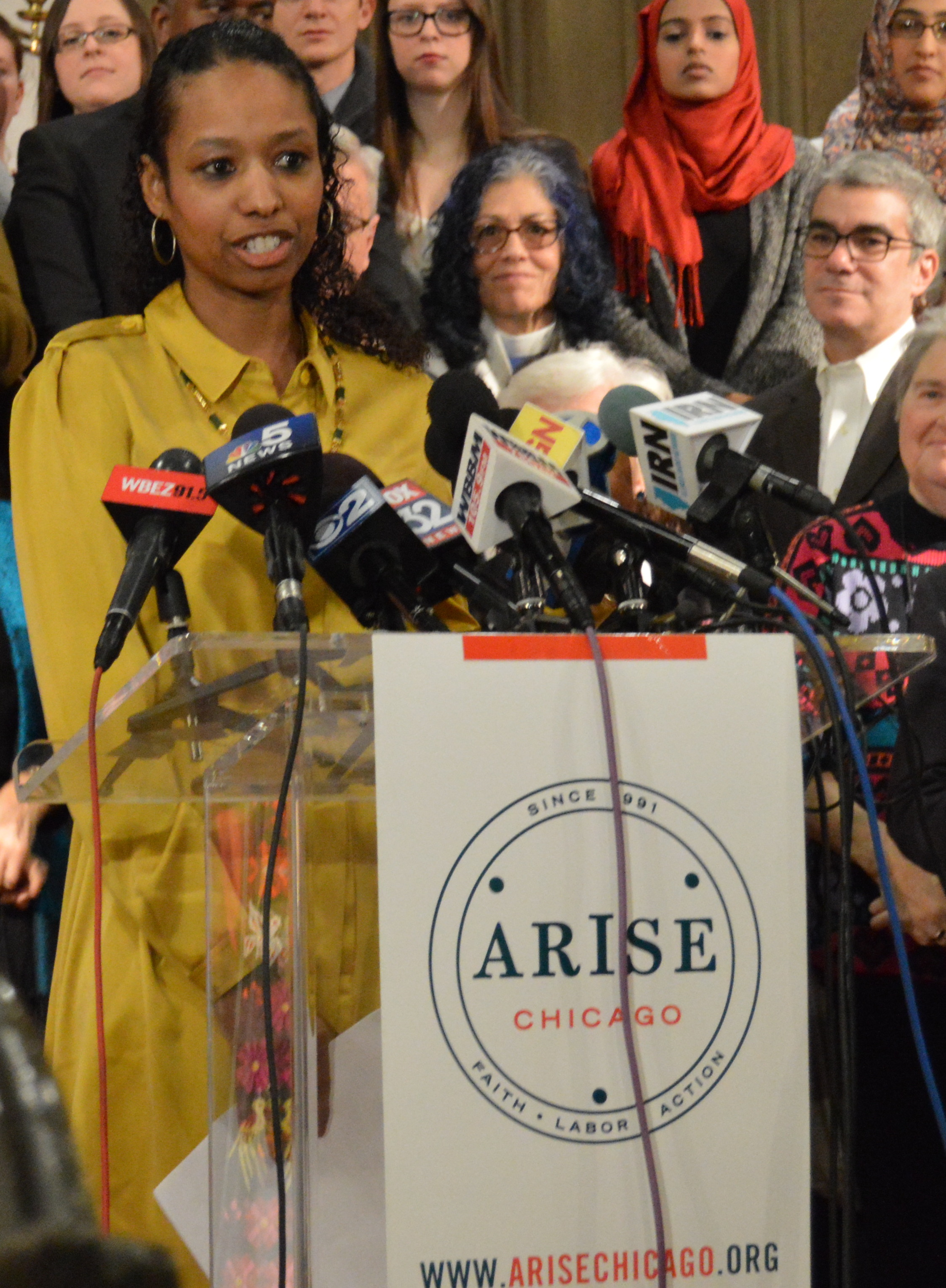
Larycia Hawkins

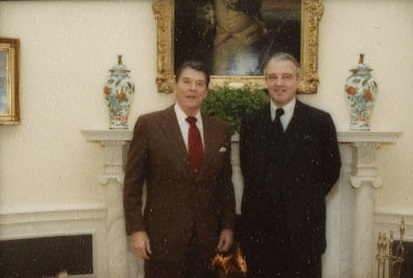
David Joran with President Ronald Reagan

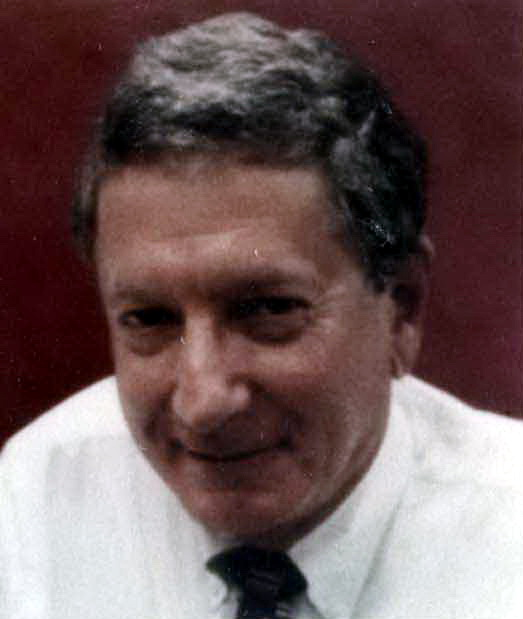
Alfred G. Gilman

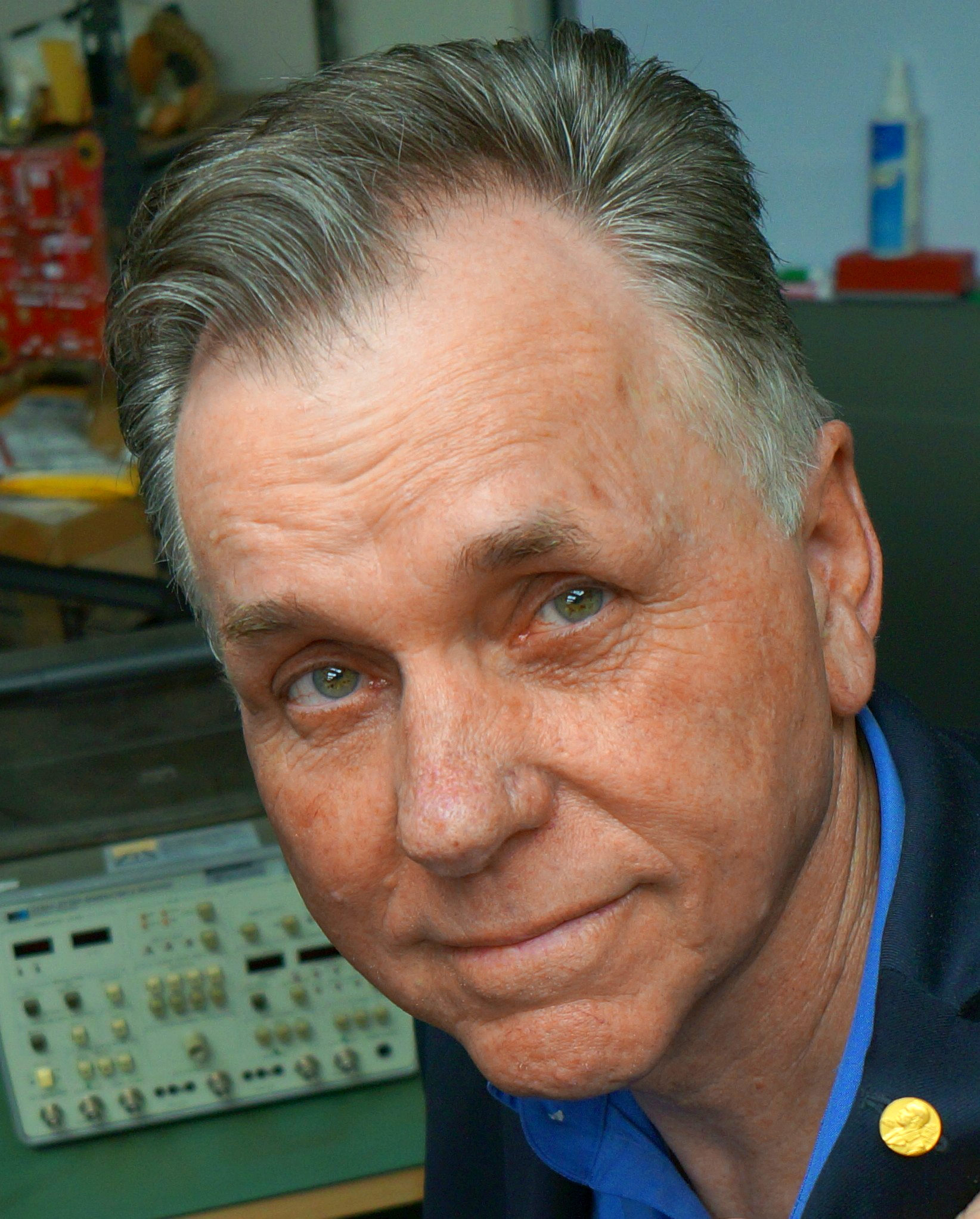
Barry Marshall

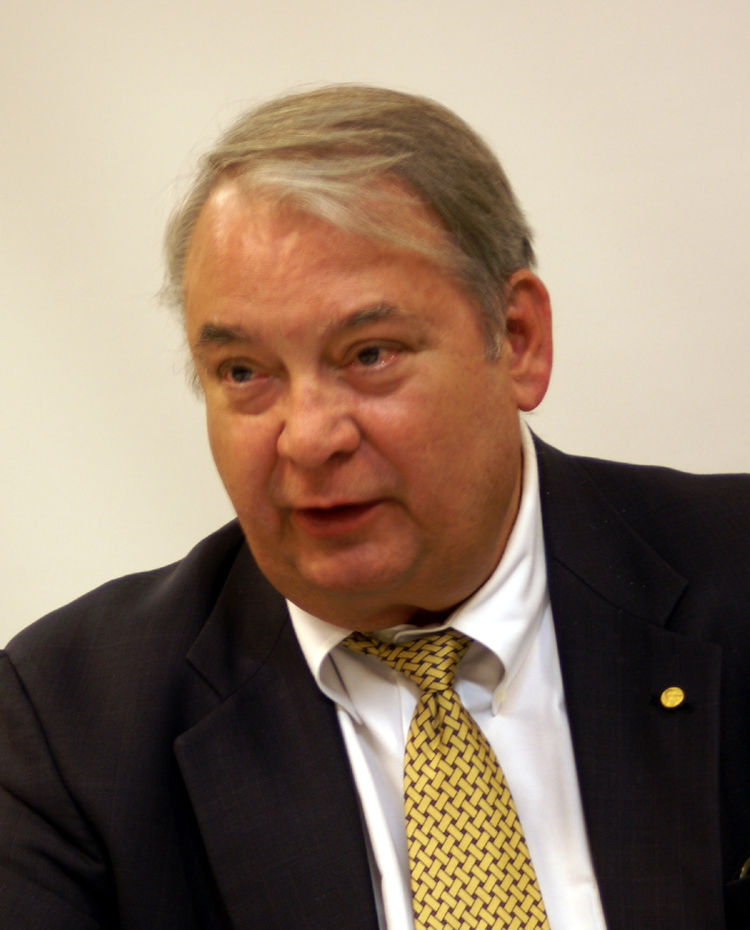
Ferid Murad

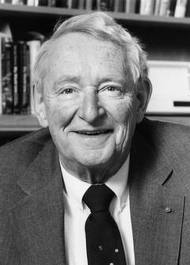
Edward Purdy

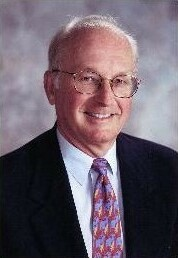
William B. Quandt

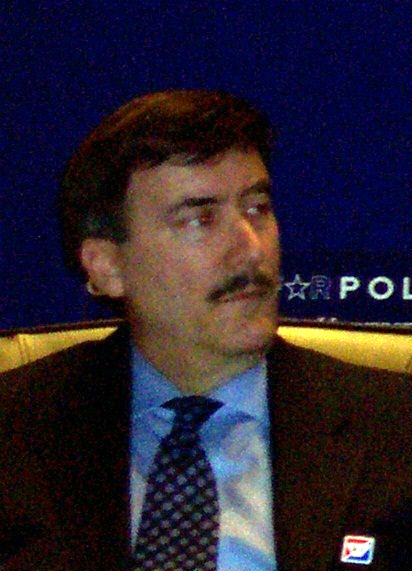
Larry Sabato

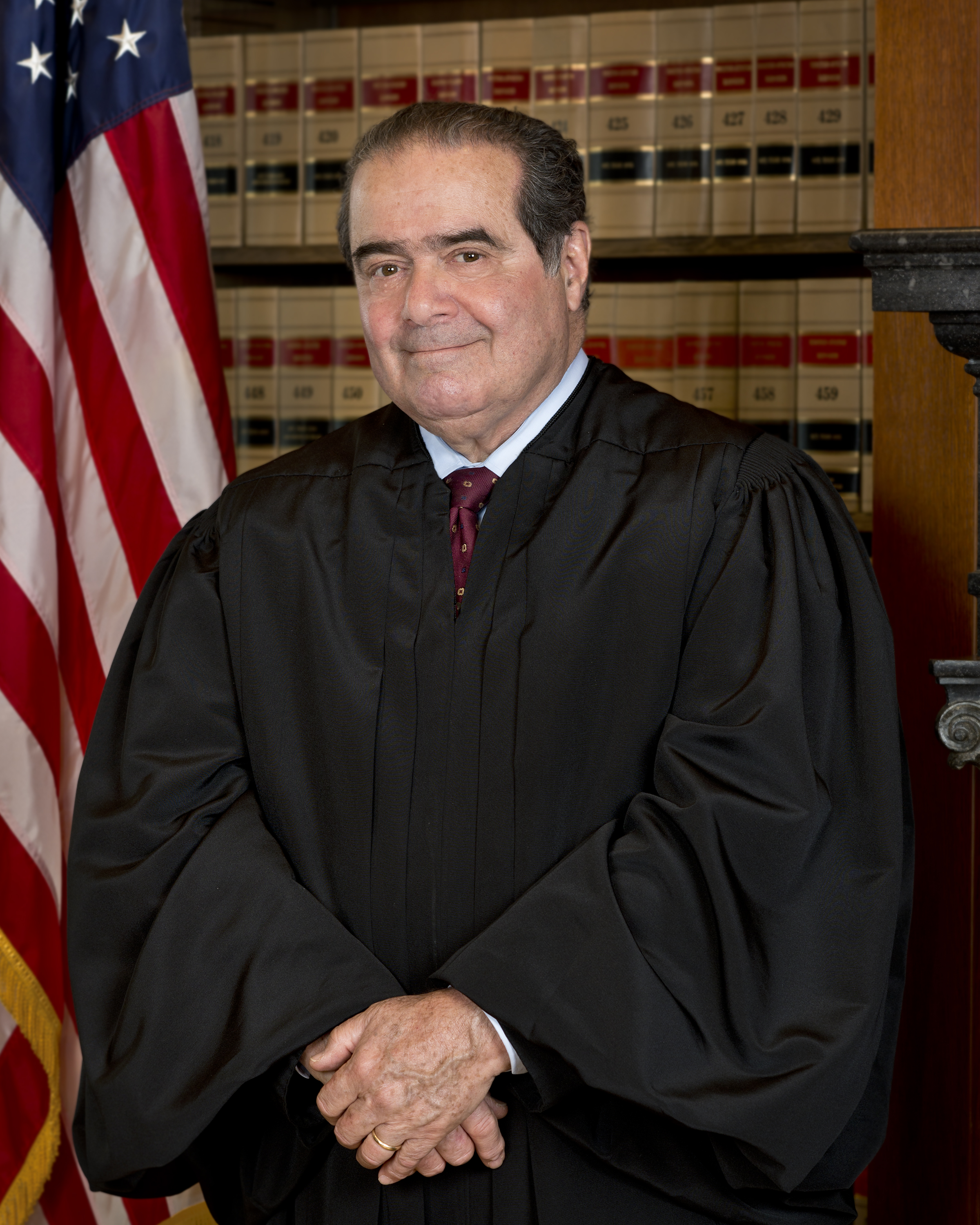
Antonin Scalia

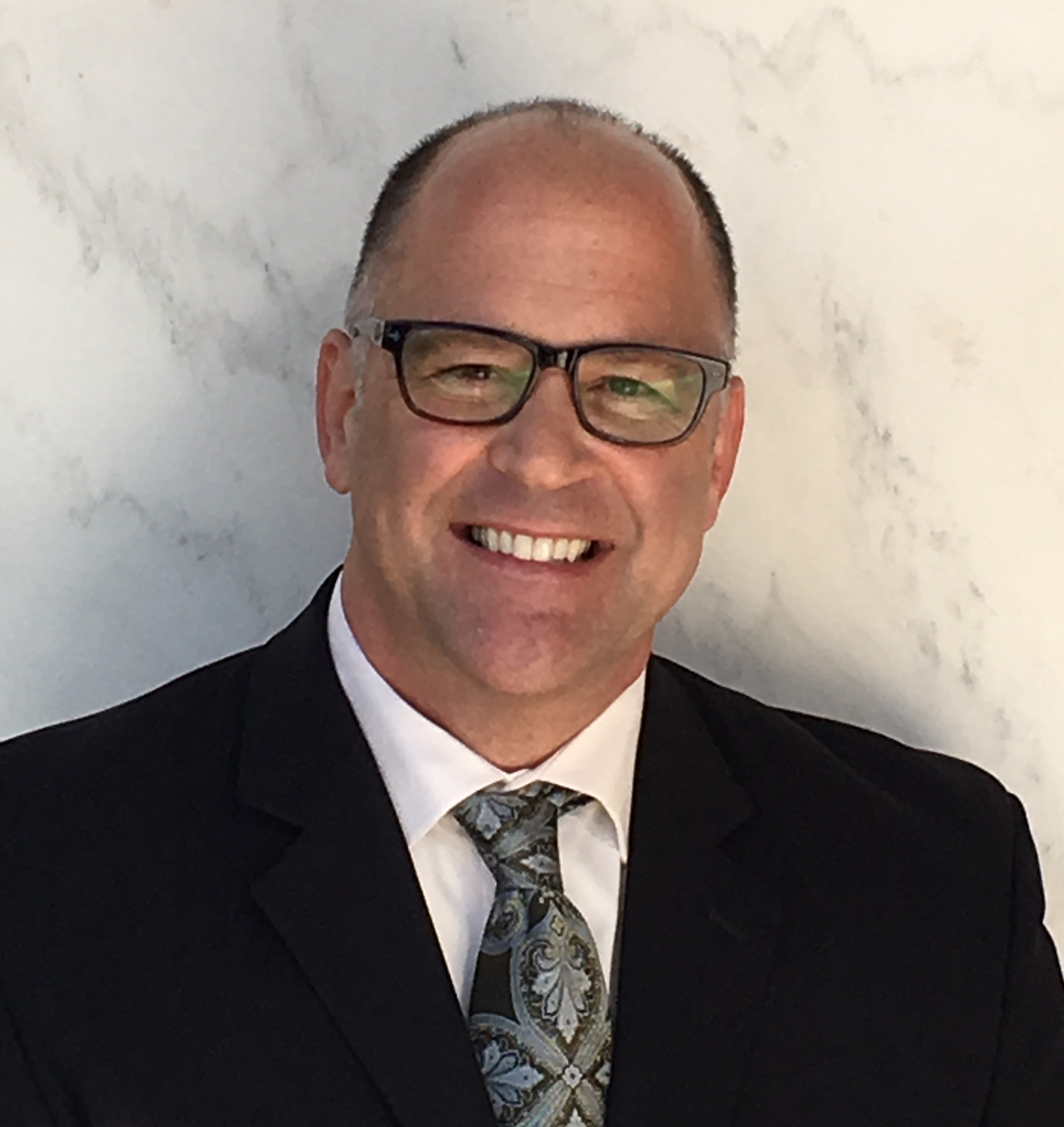
Jerry White

Name	Field	UVA position	Notability	References
Henry J. Abraham	Political Science	James Hart Professor of Government	Scholar on the judiciary and constitutional law	
Bruce Arena	Soccer	Head men's soccer coach	Coached the Virginia Cavaliers to five NCAA championships; head coach of the US national men's soccer team	
Silvia Blemker	Biomedical Engineering	Professor	Professor of biomechanical engineering; co-founder and chief scientific officer of Springbok Analytics	
Julian Bond	History	Professor	Founder of the Student Nonviolent Coordinating Committee; co-founder and first president of the Southern Poverty Law Center	
John Bonvllian	Psychology	Associate professor	Pioneer in the field of augmentative and alternative communication	
Anna Brickhouse	American Studies	Department director		
James M. Buchanan	Economics		Alfred Nobel Memorial Prize in Economic Sciences in 1986	
Lester J. Cappon	History	Archivist and professor	Archivist for Colonial Williamsburg	
Meredith Clark	Media Studies	Assistant professor	Expert on Black Twitter	
Ronald Coase	Economics		Alfred Nobel Memorial Prize in Economic Sciences in 1991	
Martha Derthick	Public Administration	Julia Allen Cooper Professor of Government and Foreign Affairs	Consummate authority on the Social Security Administration	
Robert E. Emery	Psychology	Professor and director of the Center for Children, Families, and the Law		
William Faulkner	English	Writer in residence	Nobel Prize in Literature in 1949; Pulitzer Prizes for Fiction in 1954 and 1962	
Elmer L. Gaden	Biochemistry	Wills Johnson Professor of Chemical Engineering	Known as the "father of biochemical engineering"	
Alfred G. Gilman	Pharmacology	Assistant professor	1994 Nobel Prize in Physiology	
Larycia Hawkins	Political Science	Associate professor in religious studies and political science		
Matthew Holden	Political Science	Henry L. and Grace M. Doherty Professor Emeritus of Politics	Former president of the American Political Science Association; former commissioner of the Federal Energy Regulatory Commission, Public Service Commission of Wisconsin	
Thomas M. Humphrey	Economy		Economist for the Federal Reserve Bank of Richmond	
Milton W. Humphreys	Latin and Greek	Professor		
Patricia Jennings	Education	Professor		
David C. Jordan	Political Science	Professor of International Relations and Comparative Politics	United States ambassador to Peru	
Robert S. Kemp	Business	Ramon W. Breeden Research Professor of Commerce		
Charles W. Kent	English	Professor		
W. A. Lambeth	Medicine	Professor and athletic director	First athletic director at UVA	
Jennifer L. Lawless	Political Science	Commonwealth Professor of Politics; faculty affiliate of the Frank Batten School of Leadership and Public Policy		
Angeline Stoll Lillard	Psychology	Director of Graduate Recruitment and Admissions, professor		
Dumas Malone	History	Thomas Jefferson Foundation Professor of History	Pulitzer Prize for history for his six-volume Jefferson and His Time	
Barry Marshall	Medicine		2005 Nobel Prize in Physiology	
Ferid Murad	Biochemistry, Pharmacology	Professor; director, Clinical Research Center; and director, Division of Clinical Pharmacology Department of Internal Medicine at the School of Medicine	1998 Nobel Prize in Physiology	
Edward P. Ney	Physics	Assistant Professor	Made major contributions to cosmic ray research, atmospheric physics, heliophysics, and infrared astronomy	
Brian Nosek	Psychology	Professor		
Ken Ono	Mathematics	Thomas Jefferson Professor of Mathematics	Expert on Number Theory and Srinivasa Ramanujan	
Charlotte Patterson	Psychology	Professor and director of the Women, Gender & Sexuality Program	Specialist in the psychology of sexual orientation	
Shayn Peirce-Cottler	Biomedical Engineering	Professor and chair of the Department of Biomedical Engineering		
Andrea L. Press	Media Studies and Sociology	William R. Kenan Jr. Professor of Media Studies and Sociology		
William B. Quandt	Political Science	Professor in the Department of Politics	Member of the National Security Council involved in the negotiations that led to the Camp David Accords and the Egypt–Israel peace treaty	
William Barton Rogers	Philosophy	Department head and faculty	Founded MIT and became its first president	
Richard Rorty	Philosophy	Kenan Professor of Humanities	Influential writer	
Larry Sabato	Political Science	Professor of politics; founder and director of the Center for Politics	Named the "Most Quoted College Professor in the Land" by the Wall Street Journal	
James D. Savage	Political Science	Professor of politics; faculty affiliate of the Batten School	Author and specialist in comparative budgetary, fiscal, and macroeconomic policy	
Antonin Scalia	Law	Professor	Associate justice of the Supreme Court of the United States	
Natasha Sheybani	Biomedical Engineering	Assistant professor	First UVA recipient of NCI Predoctoral-to-Postdoctoral Fellow Transition Award	
William D. Spotnitz	Medicine	Cardiothoracic surgeon, University of Virginia Health System	Researcher in the use of fibrin glue	
Herbert Stein	Economics	A. Willis Robertson Professor	Chairman of the Council of Economic Advisers under Richard Nixon and Gerald Ford	
Peter Taylor	English		Pulitzer Prize for Fiction in 1987; PEN/Malamud Award in 1993	
George Tucker	Philosophy	Professor of Moral Philosophy	Early biographer of Thomas Jefferson and member of the U.S. House of Representatives	
Eric Turkheimer	Psychology	Hugh Scott Hamilton Professor of Psychology	Specialist in how genes and environments shape the development of human behavior	
Siva Vaidhyanathan	Media Studies	Robertson Professor of Media Studies	Permanent columnist at The Guardian and Slate	
Jerry White	Business Administration	Professor of Practice; adjunct faculty of the Politics Department	CEO of Global Impact Strategies Inc.; co-recipient of the Nobel Peace Prize	
Stephen K. White	Political Science	James Hart Professor of Politics		
Bruce A. Williams	Media Studies	Professor of Media Studies		
Daniel T. Willingham	Psychology	Professor and director of Graduate Studies	Specialist in cognition related to K–12 education	
Timothy Wilson	Psychology	Sherrell J. Aston Professor of Psychology	Author of popular books	
Tibor Wlassics	Italian	Kenan Professor of Italian Studies	Research on the poet Dante Alighieri	
Brantly Womack	Political Science	Cumming Memorial Professor of Foreign Affairs		

== Rectors and members of the board of visitors ==
- Thomas Jefferson – rector (1819–1826)
- James Madison – rector (1826–1836)
- James Monroe – board of visitors
- Joseph Carrington Cabell – rector (1834–1836 & 1845–1856)
- Chapman Johnson – rector (1836–1845)
- Andrew Stevenson – rector (1856–1857)
- Thomas Jefferson Randolph – rector (1857–1864)
- Alexander Rives – rector (1865–1866)
- Robert Garlick Hill Kean – rector (1872–1876)
- Armistead C. Gordon – rector (1897–1898 & 1906–1918)
- John Stewart Bryan – rector and board member (1918–1922)
- C. Harding Walker – rector (1922–1930)
- Edward R. Stettinius Jr. – rector (1946–1949)
- Albert Vickers Bryan – rector (1960–1964)
- D. French Slaughter Jr. – rector (1980–1982)
- Fred G. Pollard – rector (1982–1987)
- Edward Elliott Elson – rector (1990–1992)
- Helen Dragas – rector (2011–2013)
- Whittington W. Clement – rector (2021–2023)

== See also ==
- List of University of Virginia School of Law alumni
