= A Walk Across the Sun =

2012 novel by Corban Addison

- First edition
- Author: Corban Addison
- Audio read by: Soneela Nankani
- Language: English
- Subject: Human trafficking
- Genre: Fiction
- Publisher: SilverOak
- Publication place: United States
- Media type: Print (hardback, paperback), ebook, audiobook
- Pages: 384 pages
- ISBN: 1402792808 First edition, hardback

A Walk Across the Sun is a 2012 novel by Corban Addison. It covers the topics of human trafficking, exploitation, and the impact that culture can play on individual relationships and the way society reacts to disparities and injustice.

== Plot ==
The novel follows two narratives; the first is the story of orphaned teenage sisters Ahalya and Sita. The siblings formerly lived near the coast of Chennai with their family, but decide to go live in a convent after a tsunami leaves them homeless and orphaned. A friend of their dead father offers to take them safely; however, he betrays them and takes them to a trafficker who sells them to a brothel in Mumbai. Ahalya agrees to sleep with the clients at the brothel to protect her younger sister from having to suffer the same fate and allows the son of the brothel owner to sleep with her almost every night. The sisters are disheartened and discouraged; a woman in the brothel tells them that this is their karma and they need to accept it, not fight it.

The second narrative of the novel follows a lawyer named Thomas, who lives in the United States. Thomas is at a low point in both his career and home life. He and his wife Priya have divorced after the death of their firstborn to SIDs. Walking in a park one day, Thomas witnesses a kidnapping and attempts to chase the kidnappers, but he is unable to catch up and the kidnappers get away. This, along with the state of his life, motivates him to take some time off of work and go to Mumbai to help out in an anti-exploitation organization, CASE.

Back in India, the sisters are separated when Sita is purchased in order to transport drugs from India to France. She is forced to be a drug mule and swallow drugs wrapped in condoms and board a plane to Paris. Once there, the drugs are retrieved and Sita is put to work without pay in a restaurant, where the owners of the establishment treat her poorly. Ahalya is rescued by Thomas and CASE after the organization discovers and raids the brothel, freeing the workers. She is sent to live in a convent, while Thomas vows to find Sita. During his work he discovers that his ex-wife is also in India, living with her family. He manages to extract a confession from the brothel owner as to Sita's whereabouts and travels to Paris, only to discover that Sita has been moved once again; she is now living in forced domestic servitude to a wealthy family who mistreats her. Sita attempts to escape, only to be recaptured and once again trafficked.

Thomas manages to track Sita to the wealthy family but only barely misses meeting her, as he catches a glimpse of her in a vehicle as it speeds off. He learns that Sita is being sent the United States and informs the FBI. In the United States, Sita has a difficult time adapting to American culture and to the demands forced upon her by her traffickers. She is forced to pose for porn but is able to avoid being raped by her captors. Her images are discovered on the dark web and the FBI manages to match Sita’s face to a picture. Thomas is able to successfully rescue Sita and reunites the two sisters. He also reconciles with Priya; the two remarry and are soon expecting another child as Thomas continues his work with CASE.

== Development ==
Addison based the fictional institution of CASE on the human rights organization International Justice Mission (JIM). The organization assisted Addison in visiting brothels and other places of exploitation in India, which inspired him to write the book. In the afterword Addison states that raising awareness of modern-day slavery and human trafficking can help abolish modern slavery, and invites readers to support an abolitionist cause or using their skills to help combat human trafficking.

== Publication ==
A Walk Across the Sun was first published in hardback on January 3, 2012 through SilverOak, alongside an ebook edition and audiobook narrated by Soneela Nankani. A mass-market paperback version was released in 2015.

== Reception ==
Publishers Weekly and the New York Journal of Books reviewed the novel, the latter of which stated that "Providing a treasure chest of prose, culture, nuance, insight, despair, and hope, A Walk Across the Sun is the kind of literature that should be celebrated and honored." The Christian Science Monitor also reviewed the work, criticizing the sub-plot of Thomas and Priya's marriage while praising Addison for his research on the slave trade and sexual trafficking. The Harvard Crimson was critical of the work, noting that while it was an "effective exploration of exploitation" the characters were all stock and the "coincidental events seem overly artificial and undermine the realism of experience."
