= Nikki Ogunnaike =

Nigerian-American magazine editor

- Born: c. 1986 (age 39–40); Nigeria
- Citizenship: U.S.
- Education: University of Virginia
- Occupations: Fashion journalist and editor
- Years active: 2008 to date
- Employer: Marie Claire

Nikki Ogunnaike (born c. 1986) is a Nigerian-American fashion journalist and the editor-in-chief of Marie Claire magazine. Previously, she worked in editorial and senior positions at Elle, Glamour, GQ, and InStyle magazines.

== Early life ==
Nikki Ogunnaike was born in Nigeria around 1986. She graduated from the University of Virginia in 2007, majoring in media studies and sociology. While a student, she interned with Domno and Glamour magazines. After graduation, she secured an internship at Elle magazine.

== Career ==
Ogunnaike has worked in editorial and senior positions at Hearst and Condé Nast, with various magazines. She started her career as a fashion journalist at Vanity Fair. Next, she was an editorial assistant at InStyle for four years. In 2012, she accepted a position with Glamour.com, working there for three and a half years. She was then a senior fashion editor and style director for Elle.com.

In October 2019, Ogunnaike became the deputy fashion director of GQ. She became the senior digital director of Harper's Bazaar in November 2020. She became the new editor-in-chief of Marie Claire, on August 8, 2023.

== Personal life ==
Ogunnike lives in Brooklyn, New York. She has worn her signature hairstyle, a buzzed undercut with a side swoop, since 2014.

== See also ==
- List of University of Virginia people
