= Heather Derr-Smith =

American poet

Heathen
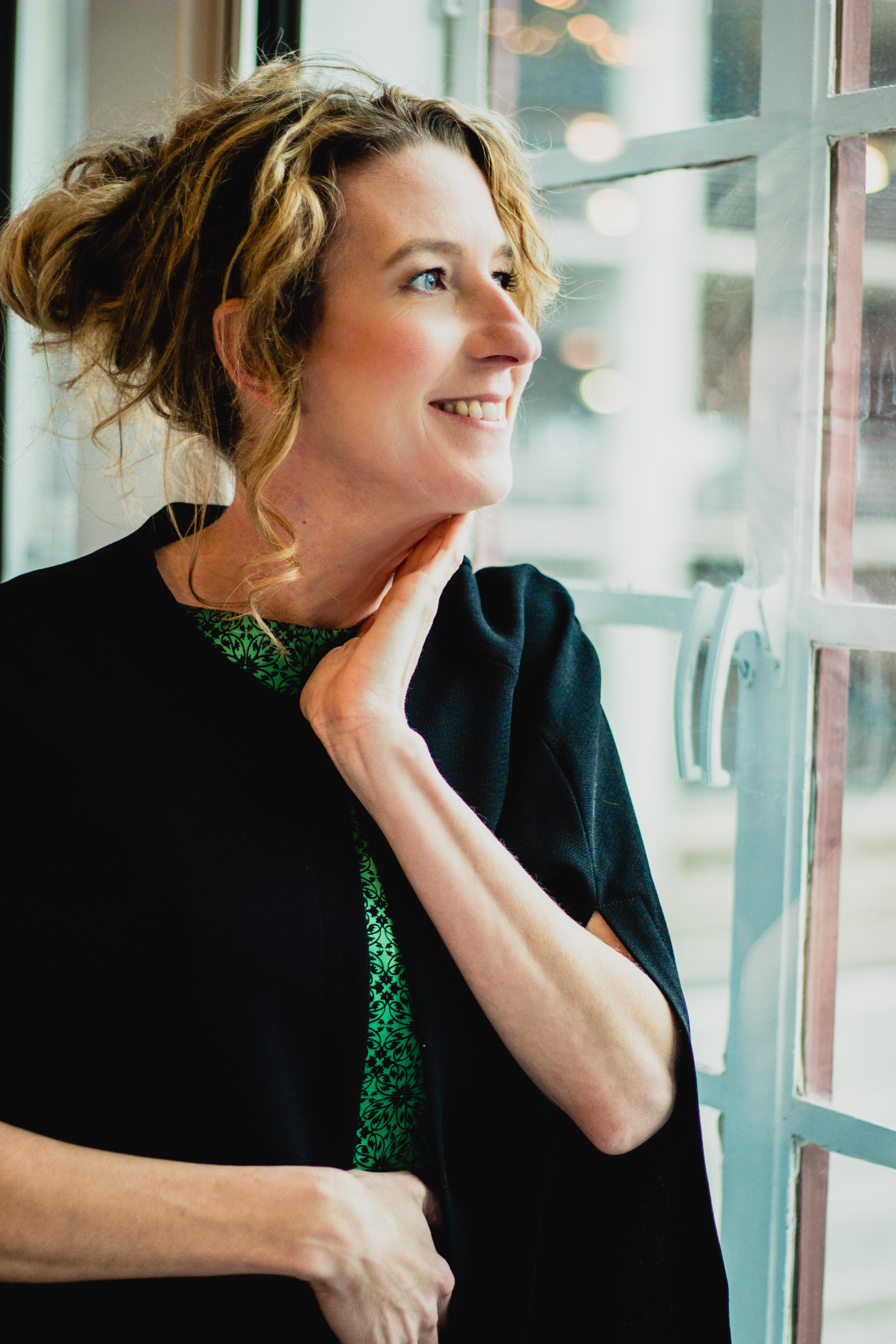
- Heather Derr-Smith
- Born: Heather Derr-Smith; Dallas, USA
- Education: University of Virginia and Iowa Writers' Workshop
- Website: heatherderrsmith.com

Heathen (Heather Derr-Smith) (born 1971) is an American poet. Their fourth book, Thrust, won the 2016 Lexi Rudnitsky Editor's Choice Award and was published by Persea Books in 2017.

== Biography ==
Derr-Smith was born in Dallas, and spent their early childhood in Los Angeles. Derr-Smith's family then moved to Fredericksburg, Virginia, where they spent their middle and high school years. They studied at the University of Virginia, earning a B.A. in Art History. There they also took poetry workshops with Gregory Orr, Charles Wright and Rita Dove.

Derr-Smith went on to earn their MFA in Poetry at the Iowa Writers' Workshop, where they studied with Marvin Bell, Jorie Graham, Jim Galvin, and Mark Doty.

Heathen's first book, Each End of the World, was published in 2005. Mark Doty called it "astonishing" and "a devastating performance." The poems are about the 1991-1996 wars in the former Yugoslavia, where Derr-Smith volunteered in a refugee camp in Gašinci, Croatia and delivered humanitarian aid in Bosnia in the summer of 1994.

Heathen's second collection of poems, The Bride Minaret, was published at the University of Akron Press. It was selected by Elton Glaser for the Akron Series in Poetry in 2008. It was edited by Mary Biddinger, who writes, "Heather Derr-Smith's second collection journeys to the rough core of desire, creating and destroying binaries along the way." The poems are about personal and global issues of exile and identity. Many of the poems were written in Damascus, Syria where Derr-Smith interviewed Iraqi and Palestinian refugees during the Iraq war troop surge of 2007. Denise Duhamel writes, "The Bride Minaret is a book of emotional, literary, and cultural substance. As Mendelson wrote of Auden: the poems bear witness to the close connection between intelligence and love."

Heathen's third collection, Tongue Screw (2016), takes a more personal turn. Stacey Waite writes, "Derr-Smith's poems are imagistically rich and unflinchingly honest as they unfold, one after the other, the thin and permeable boundaries between war and desire, violence and beauty, politics and the inexplicable motion of experience." Lee Ann Roripaugh says, "the poems in Tongue Screw are fiercely glorious in their evocation of troubled memory, gritty desire, and love's holy ghost."

Heathen's fourth collection, "Thrust"(2018), deals with generational trauma and features many poems about Sarajevo, Bosnia, a place where Derr-Smith often teaches workshops https://heatherderrsmith.com/

Heathen's fifth book, Outskirts (University of Akron Press, 2022), features several poems about the war in Eastern Ukraine, where Derr-Smith taught poetry workshops. Heathen's work often deals with war and refugees/migration.

Derr-Smit is founder and director of Cuvaj se/Take care, a nonprofit supporting writers in conflict zones, post-conflict recovery areas and communities affected by trauma.

== Works ==
- Each end of the world, Charlotte, N.C.: Main Street Rag, 2005. ISBN 9781930907744, OCLC 61484676
- The bride minaret, Akron, Ohio Univ. of Akron Press 2008. ISBN 9781931968577, OCLC 837046966
- Tongue screw, Omaha, NE: Spark Wheel Press, 2016. ISBN 9780989783743, OCLC 968337525
- Thrust: poems New York: Persea Books, 2017. ISBN 9780892554867, OCLC 966668139
- Outskirts University of Akron Press, 2022, ISBN 9781629221519
