= Robin Isadora Brown =

American scientist and researcher

Robin Isadora Brown Ph.D.
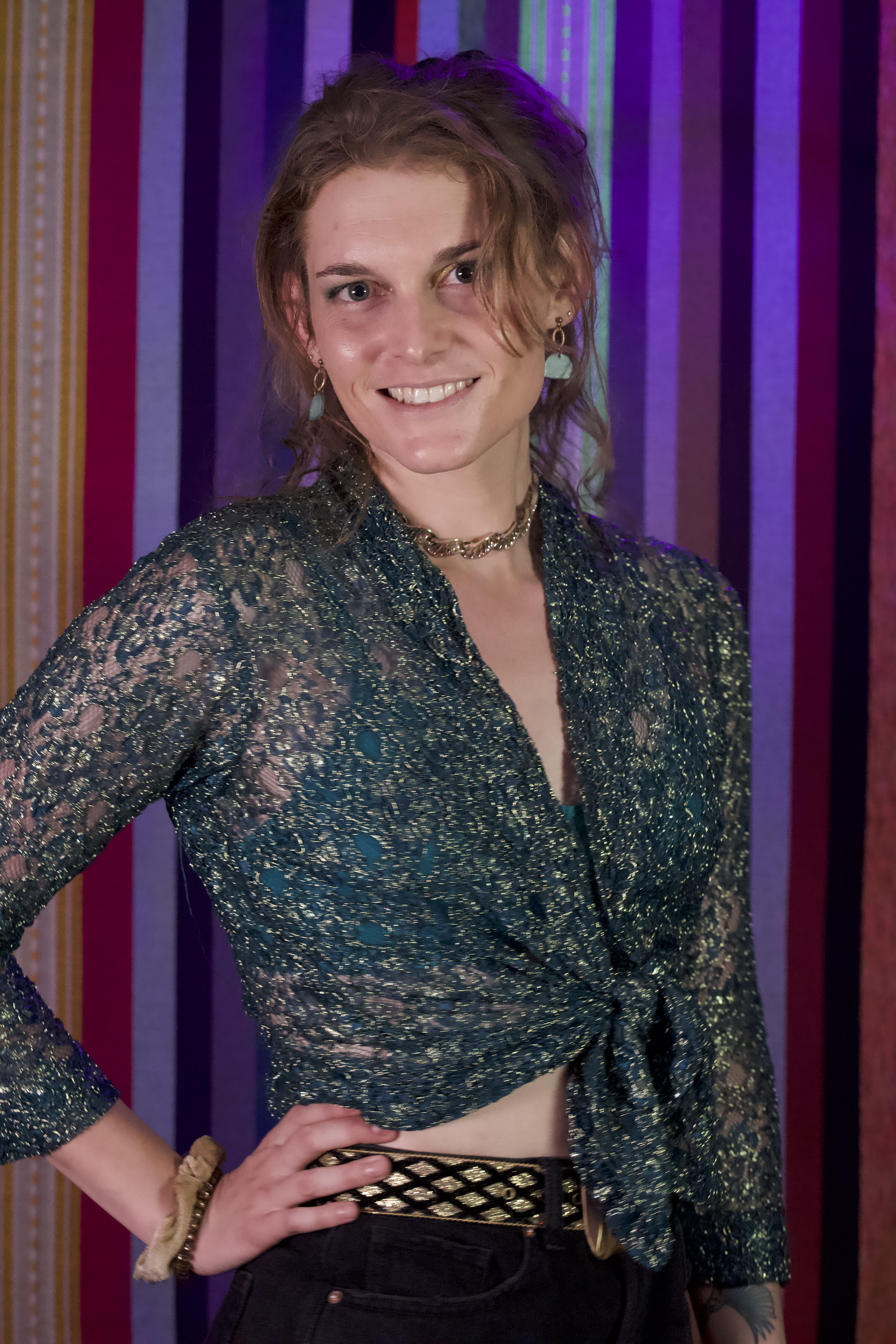
- Robin Isadora Brown, Chincilla Cafe 2024
- Occupation: science researcher
- Known for: biological research and queer history activism

Robin Isadora Brown, Ph.D. is an American scientist and researcher and queer history archivist.

== Education and work ==
Brown has a Ph.D. from University of Virginia, Charlottesville. Since 2018, her work at the Kucenas laboratory has been on satellite glial cells and sensory neurons in dorsal root ganglia. She has also studied the occupied land of the Monacan people. Brown's previous biological research was on the ecology of sunflowers, fruit fly dorso-ventral patterns, and renal dysfunction in mice.

== Music, art, and queer history activity ==
Chinchilla Café rainbow sticker

In 2023, Brown began to support, photograph, act as barista, and archive the queer DIY music venue, Chincilla Cafe in Charlottesville and from 2024-5, worked with Wikimedia and Trans Music Archive, including presenting at WikiConference America and a workshop on 'Queering Wikipedia', calling for a digital transgender archive.
