= Natasha Sheybani =

American Biomedical Engineer

- Education: Virginia Commonwealth University (BS) University of Virginia (Ph.D) Stanford University (Post-Doc)
- Known for: Focused Ultrasound Research
- Scientific career
- Fields: Biomedical Engineering Oncology Radiology

Natasha Sheybani is an American biomedical engineer who is an assistant professor of Biomedical engineering at the University of Virginia. In 2022, she was appointed as the inaugural research director of the Focused Ultrasound Cancer Immunotherapy Center at the University of Virginia, the first of its kind in the world.

She was named one of Forbes 30 Under 30 in Science in 2022 and a STAT Wunderkind in 2020.

== Education ==
Sheybani earned her Bachelor of Science in Biomedical Engineering from Virginia Commonwealth University in 2015. She went on to earn a Ph.D in Biomedical Engineering at the University of Virginia in 2020.

== Publications ==
- Curley, Colleen T.; Sheybani, Natasha D.; Bullock, Timothy N.; Price, Richard J. (2017-08-23). "Focused Ultrasound Immunotherapy for Central Nervous System Pathologies: Challenges and Opportunities". Theranostics. 7 (15): 3608–3623. doi:10.7150/thno.21225. ISSN 1838-7640. PMC 5667336. PMID 29109764.
- Sheybani, N.D., A.R. Witter, W.J. Garrison, G.W. Miller, R.J. Price, T.N.J. Bullock (2021) Profiling of the Immune Landscape in Murine Glioblastoma following Blood Brain/Tumor Barrier Disruption with MR Image-guided Focused Ultrasound. J Neurooncol. DOI: 10.1007/s11060-021-03887-4. PMID 34734364.
- Clark, R.A., Z.G. Garman, R.J. Price, and N.D. Sheybani (2021) Functional Intersections Between Extracellular Vesicles and Oncolytic Therapies. Trends Pharmacol Sci. DOI: 10.1016/j.tips.2021.09.001. PMID 34598797.
- Sheybani, N.D., V.R. Breza, S. Paul, K.S. McCauley, S.S. Berr, G.W. Miller, K.D. Neumann, and R.J. Price (2021) ImmunoPET-Informed Sequence for Focused Ultrasound-Targeted mCD47 Blockade Controls Glioma. J Control Release. DOI:10.1016/j.jconrel.2021.01.023. PMID 33476735.
- Sheybani, N.D., A.J. Batts, A.S. Mathew, E.A. Thim, and R.J. Price (2020) Focused Ultrasound Hyperthermia Augments Release of Glioma-Derived Extracellular Vesicles with Differential Immunomodulatory Capacity. Theranostics. 10:7436-7447. PMID 32642004.
