= Larycia Hawkins =

American scholar, author

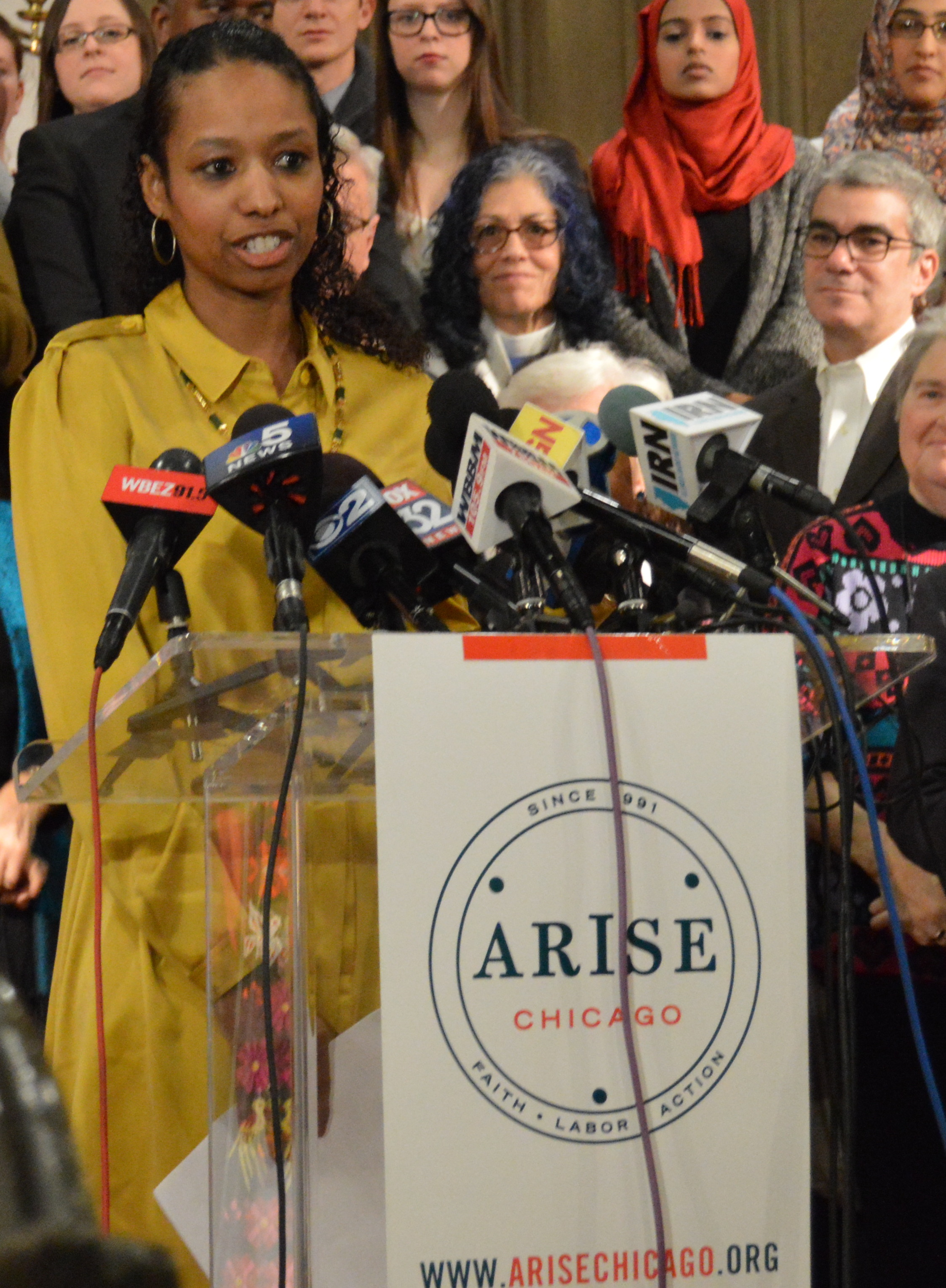
- Born: Larycia Alaine Hawkins; August 22, 1972 (age 54); Oklahoma City, Oklahoma, United States

Education
- Education: Rice University (B.A.) 1994; University of Oklahoma (M.P.A.) 2001, (PhD) 2007

Philosophical work
- Institutions: University of Virginia (current); Wheaton College (2007 – Feb 10, 2016)
- Main interests: American government and politics; Religion and politics; Policy and politics; Race and welfare politics; Interest groups and political advocacy; Research methodology

Larycia Alaine Hawkins (born August 22, 1972) is an American scholar, author, and speaker, who in 2013, became the first female African-American tenured professor at Wheaton College, a Christian Protestant liberal arts college. There she served as an associate professor of political science. She now teaches and researches at Lincoln University, where she is jointly appointed as assistant professor in the departments of politics and religious studies.

In December 2015, Hawkins became the center of a controversy when she made a post on her personal Facebook account for Advent affirming solidarity between Christians and Muslims. Wheaton College suspended her as a result of the negative publicity resulting from the social media post, which pictured her wearing hijab and explaining that it was an expression of solidarity with her Muslim sisters at a time when Muslims were facing rising ethnic tensions in the U.S. Hawkins was placed on paid administrative leave on December 15 as the school determined whether her statement that "Christians and Muslims worship the same god" was at odds with the school's core beliefs in Christianity. On February 8, 2016, Wheaton College and Hawkins issued a joint statement that they had "reached a confidential agreement under which they will part ways." On March 3, 2016, the Institute for Advanced Studies in Culture at the University of Virginia announced that Hawkins would be appointed as the school's Abd el-Kader Visiting Faculty Fellow.

== Early life and education ==
Hawkins was born in Oklahoma City, Oklahoma, and was raised in Shawnee, Oklahoma. She received her B.A. in History and Sociology from Rice University in Houston, Texas in 1994. She received an M.P.A. at the University of Oklahoma in 2001. She subsequently completed her PhD at the University of Oklahoma in political science in 2007. Her research is about black theology and its relationship to political rhetoric and black political agendas, like those of the Congressional Black Caucus and the NAACP.

== Career ==
Hawkins's early career included working in federal programs administered by the state government such as the Social Security Disability program and the Community Development Block Grant.

Hawkins joined the faculty at Wheaton College in 2007, where she served as assistant professor in the Department of Politics and International Relations from 2007 to 2014. In 2014, she was tenured and promoted to associate professor in the Department of Politics and International Relations. Hawkins is the first African American female to have been tenured at Wheaton College since its founding in 1860.

On April 26, United Theological Seminary of the Twin Cities announced that Hawkins would be their 2019 commencement speaker, with the commencement address on the theme "you were made for such a time as this."

== Controversy ==
On December 10, 2015, Hawkins wrote a Facebook post saying:

I stand in religious solidarity with Muslims because they, like me, a Christian, are people of the book. And as Pope Francis stated last week, we worship the same God. ... As part of my Advent Worship, I will wear the hijab to work at Wheaton College, to play in Chi-town, in the airport and on the airplane to my home state that initiated one of the first anti-Sharia laws (read: unconstitutional and Islamophobic), and at church.

She also added: "I have sought the advice and blessing of one of the preeminent Muslim organizations in the United States, the Council on American Islamic Relations, #CAIR, where I have a friend and Board colleague on staff." Hawkins began wearing the hijab on December 11, and continued to do so throughout Advent. Commentators such as Sharmeen Farooq remarked that Larycia Hawkins' practice was consistent with the ordinance of Christian women wearing a headcovering that is enjoined in the Bible.

On December 11, the Wheaton College administration issued a "Wheaton College Statement Regarding Christian Engagement with Muslim Neighbors" emphasizing that "overtures of Christian friendship must be enacted with theological clarity as well as compassion." Hawkins made a rejoinder on December 13, in her words, "clarifying the goal of my project and appealing to unity."

On December 15, 2015, the Wheaton College administration placed Hawkins on administrative leave and issued a "Wheaton College Statement Regarding Dr. Larycia Hawkins" "pending the full review to which she is entitled as a tenured faculty member." On December 16, 2015, the Wheaton College administration supplemented the statement to clarify that the college had placed "Dr. Larycia Hawkins on paid administrative leave in order to give more time to explore theological implications of her recent public statements concerning Christianity and Islam."

On January 5, 2016, Wheaton College issued a public notice confirming that it was beginning formal proceedings to terminate Hawkins' employment, and maintaining that Hawkins had "declined to participate in further dialogue about the theological implications of her public statements and her December 17 response".

Hawkins has made repeated statements to the press asserting her affirmation of the Wheaton College Statement of Faith. She insists that her actions were motivated by Christian faith and that she is an orthodox Protestant. Emails obtained by Time magazine revealed that Wheaton provost Stan Jones considered Hawkins's statements "innocuous", but that the college had been receiving pressure about Hawkins and another faculty member who made statements about Islam. Gary Burge, a Wheaton New Testament professor, told Time, "I have seen no theological argument from the college that would deem her commitments unacceptable." Students and alumni of Wheaton College have begun a petition to reinstate "Doc Hawk", and some professors planned to wear their academic regalia on January 11 as an expression of support.

On Saturday, February 6, 2016, in an e-mail released by Wheaton College's president, Philip Ryken, it was mutually agreed that, to help bring closure to the situation, while Wheaton would not fire Professor Hawkins, they had decided to part ways, and that she would voluntarily resign. In a separate e-mail to the faculty, Wheaton College Provost Stan Jones said that he has withdrawn charges for firing Professor Hawkins and has asked her for forgiveness in not dealing with her directly.

On March 3, 2016, the Institute for Advanced Studies in Culture at the University of Virginia announced that Hawkins would be appointed as the school's Abd el-Kader Visiting Faculty Fellow, where she would participate in two of the institute's projects, the Pluralism Project and the Race, Faith and Culture Project. Hawkins was quoted as saying that the institute was "the perfect place for me to pursue my scholarship," which will focus on relationships between race and religion.

A documentary movie, Same God, was later produced on Hawkins and the incident. Same God was previewed in 2018, with a wider release in 2019.

== Publications ==
Her publications:

=== Books ===
- "Prophetic and Priestly: The Politics of a Black Catholic Parish" (2015), In Black Scholars in White Space
- Hawkins, Larycia; Amy Black; Pearson, Doug Koopman, eds. (2011), Religion and American Politics: Classic and Contemporary Perspectives.

=== Essays ===
- Hawkins, Larycia (2006), "Religion, Race, and Rhetoric: The Black Church, Interest Groups, and Charitable Choice", in Gutterman, David S; Murphy, Andrew R (eds.), Religion, Politics, and the American Experience after September 11: New Directions, New Controversies, Lexington Books.

=== Articles ===
- "A Live Wire? The Politics of Electricity Deregulation in Oklahoma." Oklahoma Policy Studies Review: Volume III, Number 1, 14–19. 2002
- "The American Gaze Meets Black Bodies" Doc Hawk on Embodied Solidarity, July 7, 2016.

=== Editorials ===
- "A Challenge to Obama: Jump Ship." Chicago Tribune. February 5, 2007.
