= Patricia Jennings =

- Education: Antioch College; Saint Mary's College; University of California Davis
- Occupations: Educator and researcher
- Employer: University of Virginia
- Notable work: Mindfulness for Teachers: Simple Skills For Peace And Productivity In The Classroom
- Title: Professor of Education

Patricia A. Jennings is a Professor of Education at the University of Virginia.

== Education and early career ==
Patricia A. Jennings received a BA from Antioch College in 1977, an M.Ed. from Saint Mary's College in 1980, and a Ph.D. from the University of California Davis in 2004. Before her degrees in education and human development, Jennings also studied Buddhism at the Buddhist Naropa Institute in Boulder, Colorado, and later founded a Montessori school that taught meditation during the late 1980s.

== Research ==
She was an associate professor at the School of Education and Human Development (formerly the Curry School of Education), University of Virginia until 2019, when she was promoted to Full Professor. She has also served as a Research Assistant Professor at Pennsylvania State University. Jennings is to co-creator of the Cultivating Awareness and Resilience in Education (CARE) program, a thirty-hour mindfulness-based professional development program. The goal of the program is to help Pre-K-12 teachers deal with in-class stress. It was tested in a clinical trial in 2017, which involved 224 elementary school teachers, evaluating the program through teacher questionnaires and classroom observations. The results of the research showed that CARE can “increase teacher social and emotional competence and the quality of classroom interactions,” according to the New York Times. It was the largest study of its kind to date at the time. Following this, she worked on the Compassionate Schools Project research project, intended to teach and provide mindfulness skills to elementary students.

In 2018, she received the Catherine Kerr Award for Courageous and Compassionate Science. Jennings is a member of the National Academy of Sciences Committee on Fostering Healthy Mental, Emotional, and Behavioral Development among Children and Youth. In 2024 she was awarded the Joseph E. Zins Award For Outstanding Contributions to Action Research in Social and Emotional Learning by the Collaborative for Academic, Social, and Emotional Learning.

== Publications ==
Her 2009 article “The prosocial classroom: Teacher social and emotional competence in relation to student and classroom outcomes” published by the Review of Educational Research has been cited 1937 according to Scopus. Jennings's book Mindfulness for Teachers: Simple Skills For Peace And Productivity In The Classroom, was published in 2015. Her book The Trauma-Sensitive Classroom was then published in 2019, which was named one of Greater Good magazine’s top books of the year for educators that wrote that her book “urges a cognitive shift in our awareness that is refreshing, inspiring, and even collectively empowering.”

In 2020 she published her book Teacher Burnout Turnaround: Strategies for Empowered Educators with WW Norton, which was also named one of Greater Good magazine’s top books of the year for educators that wrote that her book “reminds us that the practical strategies she highlights really must be coupled with teachers’ ongoing care for their own well-being.” That year she also published Mindfulness in the PreK-5 Classroom: Helping Students Stress Less and Learn More through the same publisher. In total, as of 2025, Scopus put the number of papers that cite her work at 5106, with an h-index of 25.
