= Shayn Peirce-Cottler =

Biomedical engineering researcher

- Peirce-Cottler in 2014
- Born: Shayn McDonald Peirce
- Education: Johns Hopkins University; University of Virginia
- Scientific career
- Workplaces: University of Virginia
- Thesis: Experimental and computational analysis of spatially and temporally directed microvascular remodeling (20023)

Shayn Peirce-Cottler (née McDonald) is an American biomedical engineer who is Professor and Chair of Biomedical Engineering at the University of Virginia. Her research considers the development of computational models and machine learning algorithms to better understand biological systems. She looks to understand how tissues heal after injury and the development of therapies that induce tissue regeneration. She received the Eugene M. Landis Award in 2024.

== Early life and education ==
Peirce-Cottler became interested in biomedical engineering while at high school in Chapel Hill, North Carolina. Her father was an environmental engineer at Duke University, and she spent summers in his lab. She was a competitive swimmer, and studied at Johns Hopkins University. She moved to the University of Virginia for graduate studies, where she investigated microvascular remodeling.

== Research and career ==
In 2004, Peirce-Cottler joined the faculty at the University of Virginia. Peirce-Cottler combines computational modeling, machine learning and experiments to understand how biological tissue heals after injury. She is particularly interested in the development of strategies to induce tissue regeneration. She studies microvessels, the smallest blood vessels in the body, that deliver oxygen and nutrients. In 2022, she was made Chair of the Department of Biomedical Engineering.

== Awards and honors ==
- Elected Fellow of the American Institute for Medical and Biological Engineering
- Elected Fellow of the Biomedical Engineering Society
- UVA School of Medicine Robert H. Kader Award
- Microcirculatory Society Eugene M. Landis Award

== Selected publications ==
- Shayn Peirce; T C Skalak; G T Rodeheaver (2000). "Ischemia-reperfusion injury in chronic pressure ulcer formation: a skin model in the rat". Wound Repair and Regeneration. 8 (1): 68–76. doi:10.1046/j.1524-475x.2000.00068.x. PMID 10760216. Wikidata Q30305560.
- Bruce A Corliss; Mohammad S Azimi; Jennifer M Munson; Shayn Peirce; Walter L Murfee (2015). "Macrophages: An Inflammatory Link Between Angiogenesis and Lymphangiogenesis". Microcirculation. 23 (2): 95–121. doi:10.1111/micc.12259. PMC 4744134. PMID 26614117. Wikidata Q30278005.
- Joseph Walpole; Papin, Jason; Shayn M Peirce (2013). "Multiscale computational models of complex biological systems". Annual Review of Biomedical Engineering. 15: 137–154. doi:10.1146/annurev-bioeng-071811-150104. PMC 3970111. PMID 23642247. Wikidata Q30413613.
