= Silvia Blemker =

- Organization(s): University of Virginia School of Engineering and Applied Science, The Multiscale Muscle Mechanophysiology (M3) lab
- Known for: Muscle, computer modeling, imaging, biomechanics
- Title: Professor in Biomedical Engineering and Professor in Mechanical and Aerospace Engineering (Courtesy)

Silvia Salinas Blemker is a Full Professor in Biomedical Engineering at the University of Virginia. Her research focuses on characterizing the structure and properties of muscle tissue through biomechanical modelling. She is the principal investigator of the Multiscale Muscle Mechanophysiology (M3) lab at the same university.

Additionally, she is co-founder and Chief Scientific Officer (CSO) of Springbok Analytics, which focuses on analyzing MRI data of muscle tissue using AI. She is from Lawrence, Kansas.

== Education ==
Blemker completed a Bachelor of Science in Bioengineering and Biomedical Engineering in 1997, followed by a Master of Science in the same field in 1999, both from Northwestern University in Illinois. She subsequently obtained a Ph.D. in Mechanical Engineering in 2004 from Stanford University.

== Academic career ==
After obtaining her PhD, Dr. Blemker became an Assistant Professor in Biomedical Engineering and Mechanical & Aerospace Engineering in 2006, followed by an Associate Professorship in the same subjects in 2012 at the University of Virginia. In 2018, she was promoted to a Professorship, with the additional subject of Orthopaedic Surgery also at the University of Virginia.

In 2024, she was elected as a fellow within the National Academy of Inventors in recognition of her ability to turn research into useable tools and especially the work she is doing with Springbok Analytics in relation to the analysis MRIs using AI and her further research into using muscle disease biomarkers to improve diagnostics.

== Industry career ==
In 2013, Dr. Blemker co-founded Springbok Analytics. Springbok Analytics' mission is to make muscle health "understandable and actionable, empower clinicians, researchers, and performance professionals with precise muscle health insights" to support decision-making. The technology used provides "objective, validated AI-powered muscle insights for research, performance, and proactive health". Essentially Dr. Blemker and her team developed a repeatable, MRI-based method for tracking muscle health, quantifying individual muscle quality, fat infiltration, and symmetry, providing precise, actionable data at the individual muscle level. This technology is FDA-cleared and supports high-resolution muscle segmentation and analysis.

== Research ==
Dr. Blemker’s research focuses on modeling the structure and function of skeletal muscle using imaging and computational techniques to study muscle mechanics, injury, and rehabilitation. Dr. Blemker's research leverages experimental and computational models in interest to characterize relationships between muscle structure, biomechanical properties, biology, and function with the goal to develop new musculoskeletal disease treatments. Dr. Blemker runs the Multiscale Muscle Mechanophysiology ("M3") laboratory at the University of Virginia. The ultimate goal of this laboratory is to improve treatments and quality of life for individuals suffering from muscle-related clinical problems.
