= Stephen P. Joyce =

American businessman (born 1961)

- Born: c. 1961 (age 64–65)
- Education: University of Virginia
- Occupation: Businessman

Stephen P. Joyce (born c. 1961) is an American businessman. He was the chief executive officer of Dine Brands Global, the operator of IHOP and Applebee's franchises. He most recently served as Interim CEO of Re/Max from 2022 to late 2023, and currently remains on the company's Board of Directors.

== Early life ==
Joyce was born circa 1961. He is of Irish descent.

Joyce holds a bachelors degrees in Commerce from the University of Virginia and has done graduate work at the Wharton School of the University of Pennsylvania, Cornell University and the Aspen Institute.

== Career ==
Joyce worked for Marriott International for 25 years.

From 2008 to 2017, Joyce was the president and CEO of Choice Hotels. During his tenure, in the fall of 2010, he was featured on an episode of the CBS reality TV series Undercover Boss.

Joyce was the CEO of Dine Brands Global from September 2017 to February 2021, and was CEO of Re/Max from March 2022 to November 2023.

He was formerly Chairman of the U.S. Travel Association, and has been a member of the Board of Directors for the Wolf Trap Foundation for the Performing Arts, the Autism Learning Center, and The Real Estate Roundtable.
