= Lisa L. Cunningham =

American scientist

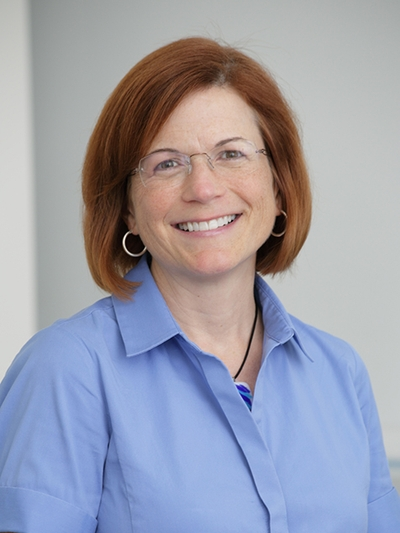
- Born: Lisa Lynn Cunningham
- Education: University of Tennessee (B.A., M.A.); University of Virginia (Ph.D.)
- Scientific career
- Workplaces: Medical University of South Carolina; National Institute on Deafness and Other Communication Disorders
- Theses: Effects of click polarity on auditory brainstem responses in man using high-pass noise masking (1991); Novel roles for the retinal pigment epithelium in expression and turnover of interphotoreceptor retinoid-binding protein (1999)
- Doctoral advisor: Federico Gonzalez-Fernandez
- Other academic advisors: Samuel B. Burchfield; James W. Thelin; Edwin Rubel

Lisa Lynn Cunningham is an American scientist. She is Scientific Director and a senior investigator of sensory cell biology at the National Institute on Deafness and Other Communication Disorders (NIDCD).

== Education ==
Cunningham received a B.A. and M.A. in Audiology from the University of Tennessee. She was first introduced to the field of audiology by Samuel B. Burchfield. Her 1991 thesis was titled: Effects of click polarity on auditory brainstem responses in man using high-pass noise masking. She completed her thesis under the guidance of her major advisor, James W. Thelin and she credits Ravi Krishnan for his part in its conception. Cunningham completed a Clinical Fellowship in Audiology at Indiana University Health University Hospital. She received a Ph.D. in Neuroscience from the University of Virginia. Her dissertation was titled: Novel roles for the retinal pigment epithelium in expression and turnover of interphotoreceptor retinoid-binding protein. Her doctoral advisor was Federico Gonzalez-Fernandez. Cunningham completed a post-doctoral fellowship in Auditory Neuroscience at the University of Washington with Edwin Rubel.

== Career and research ==
After her post-doc, Cunningham worked as an assistant professor at the Medical University of South Carolina where her lab conducted the initial studies on heat shock protein (HSP)-mediated protection against ototoxic drug-induced hearing loss and hair cell death. This work was funded by a Research Project Grant (R01) from the NIDCD.

In January 2011, Cunningham joined the NIDCD Intramural Division as acting chief of the Section on Sensory Cell Biology. Her research interests build on prior work studying the role of heat shock proteins (HSPs) in protecting hair cells against ototoxic drug–induced hearing loss and hair cell death. As chief, she led a team aimed at understanding the molecular mechanisms underlying the protective effects of HSPs, and translating the findings into clinical therapies to prevent hearing loss caused by exposure to ototoxic drugs.

In November 2014, she became a tenured Senior Investigator.

In April 2021, she became Scientific Director of NIDCD.
