= Corban Addison =

American author

- Born: Carlsbad, California, U.S.
- Education: California Polytechnic State University (BS); University of Virginia School of Law (JD)
- Occupation: Author
- Website: corbanaddison.com

Corban Addison is an American author. He holds degrees in law and mechanical engineering from the University of Virginia School of Law and California Polytechnic State University. He has published both fiction and non-fiction.

== Early life and education ==
Addison is a native of Carlsbad, California. He majored in engineering at California Polytechnic State University before attending the University of Virginia School of Law, graduating in 2004.

== Law career ==
Addison clerked for U.S. Magistrate Judge B. Waugh Crigler before joining Charlottesville-based law firm Scott Kroner.

== Bibliography ==
- A Walk Across the Sun (2011)
- The Garden of the Burning Sand (2013)
- The Tears of Dark Water (2015)
- A Harvest of Thorns (2017)
- Wasteland: The Story of Farm Country on Trial (2022)

== Recognition ==
In April 2023, Addison’s Book Wastelands: The True Story of Farm Country on Trial was awarded the 2023 Reed Environmental Writing Award by the Southern Environmental Law Center.
