= University of Virginia School of Medicine =

Public medical school in Charlottesville, Virginia, US

Coordinates: 38.0315°N 78.5009°W

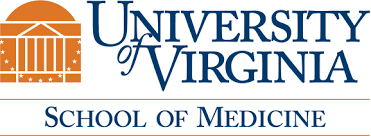
- Type: Public
- Established: October 4, 1819; 207 years ago
- Founder: Thomas Jefferson
- Parent institution: University of Virginia
- Dean: Colin Derdeyn, MD (Interim)
- Students: 700; 612 M.D. 55 M.D./PhD; 200 PhD
- Location: Charlottesville, Falls Church (only 3rd and 4th years), Virginia, US
- Website: www.med.virginia.edu

The University of Virginia School of Medicine (UVA SOM or more commonly known as Virginia Medicine) is the graduate medical school of the University of Virginia. The school's facilities are on the University of Virginia grounds adjacent to Academical Village in Charlottesville, Virginia as well as a second campus located in Falls Church, Virginia.

Founded in 1819 by Thomas Jefferson, UVA SOM is the tenth oldest medical school in the United States. The School of Medicine confers Doctor of Medicine (M.D.) and Doctor of Philosophy (PhD) degrees, and is closely associated with both the University of Virginia Health System and Inova Health System. Notable distinguished alumni include Walter Reed, Vivian Pinn, and many other leaders in medicine. The School is widely considered to be one of the most prestigious medical schools in the United States with many medical discoveries made on Grounds.

== History ==
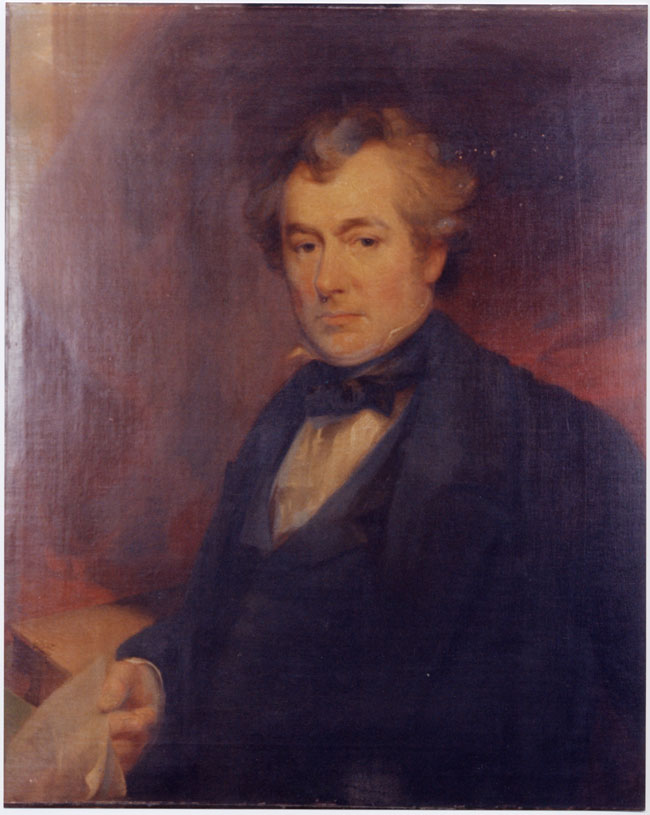
Dr. Robley Dunglison, the "Father of American Physiology" was the first professor of medicine at the University of Virginia

The UVA Health System's history can be traced to the original conception of the University of Virginia on August 1, 1818, whereupon Thomas Jefferson, James Madison, and twenty-one other men first compiled a report for the Virginia State Legislature to determine a site, building plans, and courses for study for the University of Virginia. Acknowledging that clinical lectures and medical training were not available in Charlottesville at that time, Jefferson and his colleagues determined that the university should offer education in "the elements of medical science...with a history and explanation of all its successive theories from Hippocrates to the present day," as a way to train both prospective physicians, as well as those students with a more dilettante interest in medicine.

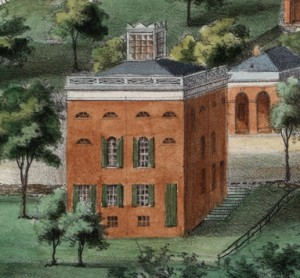
Detail of the Anatomical Theatre from View of the University. A cupola was not part of Jefferson's design; it was probably added after the 1837 resolution to raise the roof. This image clearly shows the cupola was present in 1856. Hand colored.

At the first meeting of the university's Board of Visitors in 1819, a School of Medicine was authorized. The School of Medicine – the 10th medical school in the U.S. – officially opened in March 1825 with a single professor, Dr. Robley Dunglison. Dunglison had been actively recruited by Thomas Jefferson, and had traveled from London to take up his new position.

Just weeks before Dunglison and his wife arrived in the United States, Jefferson had written to Joseph C. Cabell that an anatomical theater would be "indispensable to the school of anatomy," and that "there cannot be a single dissection until a proper theater is prepared giving an advantageous view of the operation to those within, and effectually excluding observation from without." This structure, which was eventually demolished in 1938, was one of the first of its kind in the entire United States, conceived and blueprinted by Jefferson himself, who pushed fervently for its construction up until the time of his death in 1825.

The University of Virginia School of Medicine graduated its first four students in 1828, and in 1832, became the first medical school in the United States to standardize the criteria for admission.

More than 75 years later, UVA opened its first hospital in March 1901 with 25 beds and three operating rooms. Just as medical education has been a part of UVA since its founding, so too has medical literature – the 8,000 books purchased by Jefferson to create the University Library included 710 books on the medical sciences. UVA's medical literature moved to the UVA Medical School building in 1929. Its current home was dedicated in April 1976.

In 2016, UVA announced a partnership with Inova Fairfax to establish a satellite campus at the flagship Inova hospital in Northern Virginia. This agreement also included the establishment of a personal genomics center and a collaboration between the cancer centers of the two entities.

=== Historical Timeline ===
- 1826 – Anatomical Hall designed and built by Jefferson.
- 1828 – First University degrees awarded to four medical graduates.
- 1892 – Medical course lengthened to two years.
- 1895 – Medical course extended to three years.
- 1898 – Medical course lengthened to four years.
- 1901 – Opening of the University of Virginia Hospital (25 beds). Dr. Paul Barringer named superintendent.
- 1905 – Richard Henry Whitehead, M.D., LL.D., dean of the University of North Carolina School of Medicine named first dean of the University of Virginia School of Medicine. Whitehead reorganized the hospital to a primarily teaching facility. He emphasized scholarship and basic science well in advance of the Flexner Report.
- 1924 – First Woman Graduate (and only in that year), Lila Morse Bonner (later married name Lila Bonner Miller, MD).
- 1929 – New medical school building opened (cost $1.4 million).
- 1960 – West Complex expanded into new hospital, completed at a cost of $6.5 million.
- 1989 – University of Virginia Replacement Hospital (556 beds) was dedicated, at a cost of $230 million.
- 2014 – Medical school curriculum updated to system-based instruction, and classroom program shortened to 1.5 years. Claude Moore Medical Education building opened.

== Facilities ==
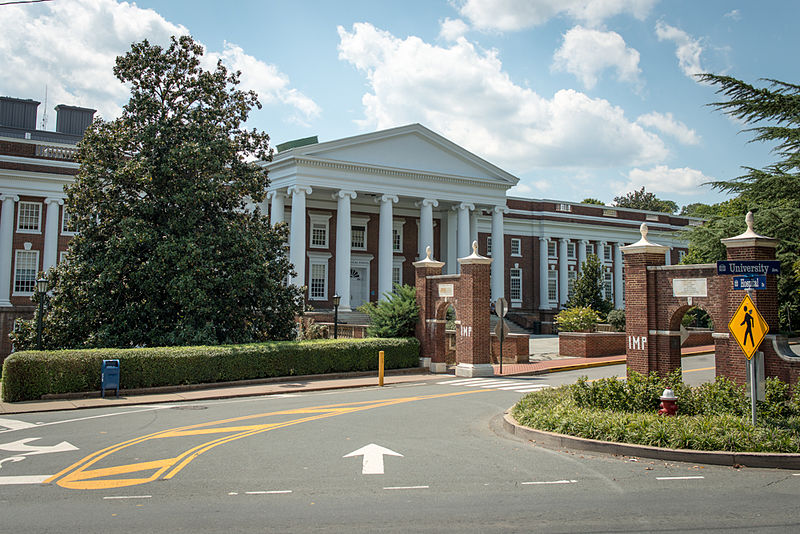
Exterior of the old building of The University of Virginia School of Medicine, located near "The Corner" of Grounds

The School of Medicine is affiliated with the University of Virginia Health System.

The UVA Hospital is a large tertiary care hospital with more than 500 beds, not including a 45-bed neonatal intensive care unit and 20-bed nursery. The Children's Hospital is served by the Newborn Emergency Transport System (NETS), which transports critically ill newborns and pediatrics from all over the surrounding area and states back to UVA. The hospital is a Level I trauma center and is accessible by ambulance as well as Pegasus, UVA Health System's air and ground transport service for critically ill and injured patients. As an academic medical center, patients at UVA are treated by physicians who are also faculty members at the UVA School of Medicine.

The Claude Moore Health Sciences Library opened in 2014 and serves the School of Medicine and the Health System. The library is located within the Medical Center.

From years 2016–2019, UVA Hospital was named the number 1 hospital in Virginia.

== Clinical education and learning societies ==
UVA utilizes a unique "Next Generation" integrated curriculum that allows medical students to spend more time in the clinic by condensing the first 2 years of classes into 1.5 years. Uniquely, students enter Clerkship and take Step 1 and Step 2 together in their fourth year. UVA features accredited programs (via the Accreditation Council for Graduate Medical Education) of resident and fellowship education in general, specialty, and subspecialty fields.

Upon matriculation, students are divided into one of four learning communities. Reed College, Hunter College, Dunglinson College, and Pinn College are each named after influential UVA SOM alumni.

== Research ==
The University of Virginia School of Medicine is home to more than 300 laboratories, many of which are located at the Medical Center including pinn Hall, MR-4, MR-5, MR-6, and the West Complex (Hospital West).

In 1889, philanthropist Oliver Hazard Payne bequeathed a $100,000 grant to the medical school, to help establish laboratories of experimental medicine.

Founded in 1967, the Department of Perceptual Studies is unusual in that it is one of the few academic research groups in the field of "supernatural phenomena" with board-certified physicians and scientists at a respected university.

=== Notable discoveries ===
- 1928 – 1952 – Sidney William Britton, Ph.D., professor of physiology and Herbert Silvette, Ph.D., professor of pharmacology, demonstrated that the adrenal cortex contained a hormone, not epinephrine, which influenced carbohydrate storage and metabolism.
- 1935 – 1967 – Alfred Chanutin, Ph.D., professor and chair of biochemistry, discovered the role of red blood cell 2,3-diphosphoglycerate (2,3-DPG) in oxygen transfer from hemoglobin. This finding had enormous impact on the preservation of blood for transfusion therapy.
- 1939 – Dupont Guerry III, M.D. intern, and William Wirt Waddell Jr., a pediatrician, discovered the role of vitamin K in the etiology, treatment, and prevention of hypoprothrombinemia and hemorrhagic disease of the newborn.
- 1966 – 1988 – Robert M. Berne, M.D., professor and chair of physiology, pioneered adenosine in cardiovascular function and introduced adenosine as a therapeutic agent in the treatment of supraventricular tachycardia.
- 1971 – 1981 – Alfred G. Gilman, M.D., Ph.D., professor of pharmacology discovered G-proteins, cellular mediators of hormone action, for which he received the 1989 Albert Lasker Award and the 1994 Nobel Prize in Physiology or Medicine.
- 1970 – 1983 – Ferid Murad, M.D., PhD, professor of medicine, discovered that endothelium-derived relaxing factor is nitric oxide, which acts as a vasodilator by stimulating guanylyl cyclase. Murad received the Albert Lasker Award in 1996 and the Nobel Prize in Medicine or Physiology in 1998 for this discovery.
- 1976 – Michael O. Thorner, M.B.B.S., D.Sc., professor of medicine, discovered a new hypothalamic hormone, growth hormone releasing hormone. Thorner received the 1995 NIH General Clinical Research Centers Award for his work in clinical neuroendocrinology.
- 1995 – Barry Marshall, M.B.B.S., Associate Professor of Internal Medicine, received the Albert Lasker Award Medicine for his discovery that the bacterium Helicobacter pylori is the cause of peptic ulcer disease and also is associated with gastric carcinoma.

== Research centers and core facilities ==
=== Research centers ===
- The UVA Cancer Center is headed by Thomas P. Loughran Jr. and was ranked in 2016 by U.S. News & World Report as one of the top 2–3% of cancer specialty centers nationwide.
- The Carter Immunology Center is one of the largest research centers in the School of Medicine with over 50 faculty members.
- Cardiovascular Research Center
- The Center for Brain Immunology & Glia is a group of labs in the Department of Neuroscience. In recent years, BIG has been one of UVA's most productive collaborative research centers, with research being nominated for Science's Breakthrough of the Year. Notable discoveries as of late include discovering a link between the brain and the immune system, identifying major genetic causes of schizophrenia, and a link between the immune system and social behavior.
- The Center for Diabetes Technology has been the subject of publicity for its role in the development of the artificial pancreas, a major breakthrough in the treatment of type 1 diabetes.
- Thaler Center for AIDS and HIV Research

== Notable faculty ==
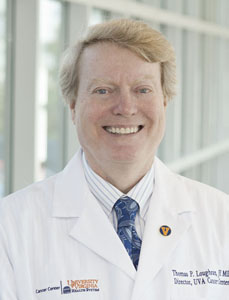
Thomas P. Loughran Jr., hematologist notable for his discovery and research of large granular lymphocytic leukemia

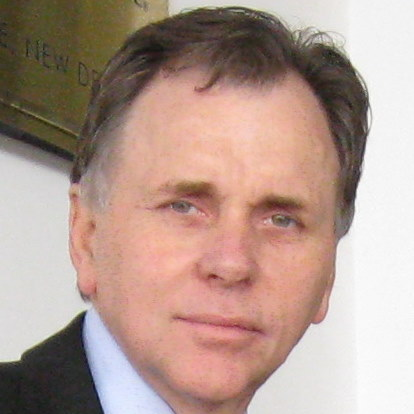
Barry Marshall, 2005 Nobel Prize in Physiology laureate for his research on the role of bacterium Helicobacter pylori in the pathogenesis of peptic ulcer disease

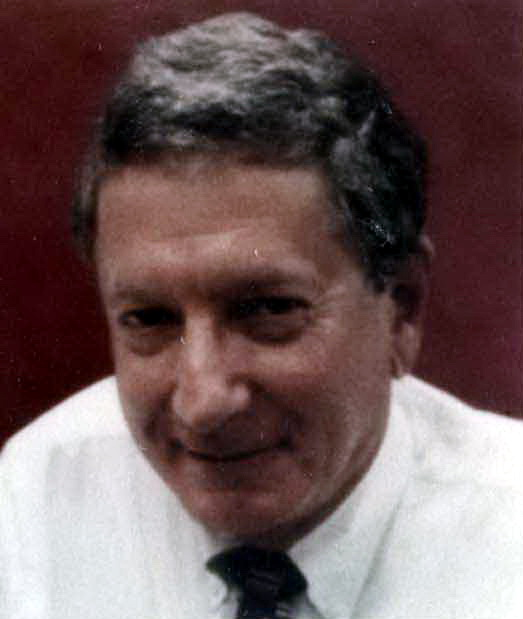
Alfred G. Gilman, 1994 Nobel Prize in Physiology laureate for discovery of G-proteins and the role of these proteins in signal transduction in cells

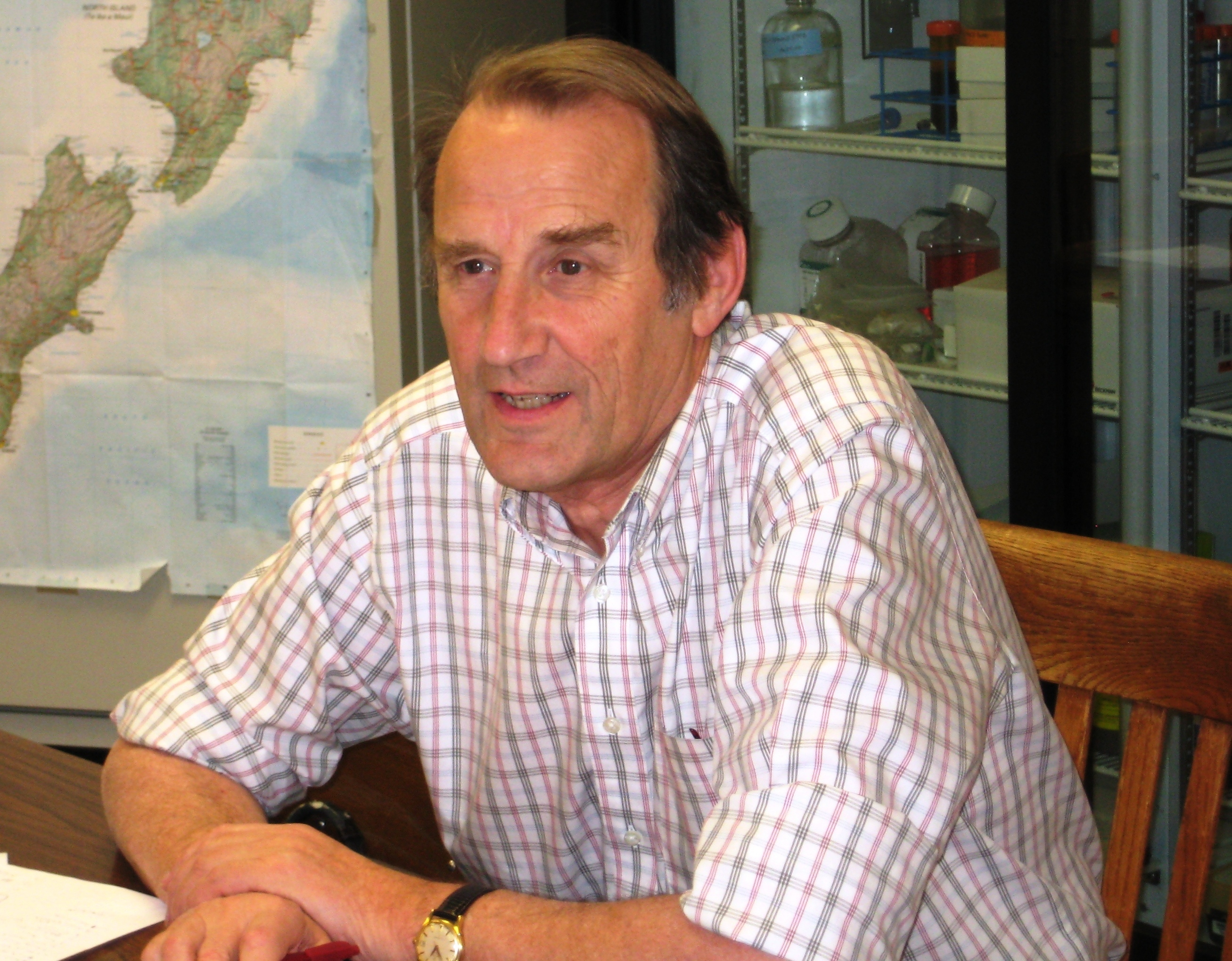
Thomas Platts-Mills, allergist/immunologist, 2007 Fellow of the Royal Society, notable for discovery of dust mite antigen and alpha-gal allergy

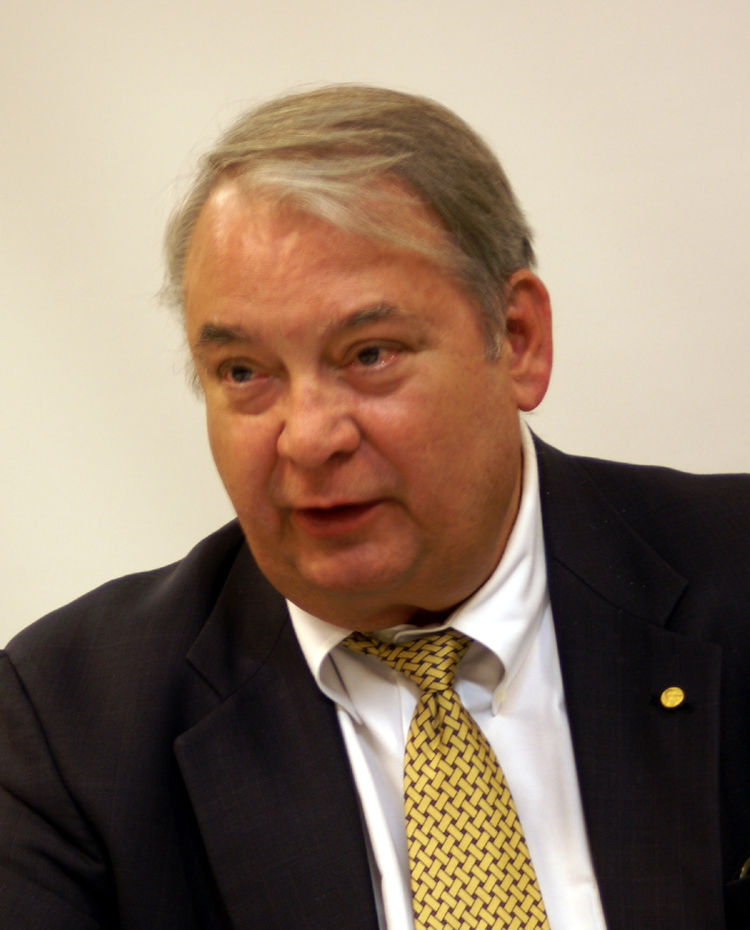
Ferid Murad, 1998 Nobel Prize in Physiology laureate for his research on the role of nitric oxide as a signaling molecule in the cardiovascular system

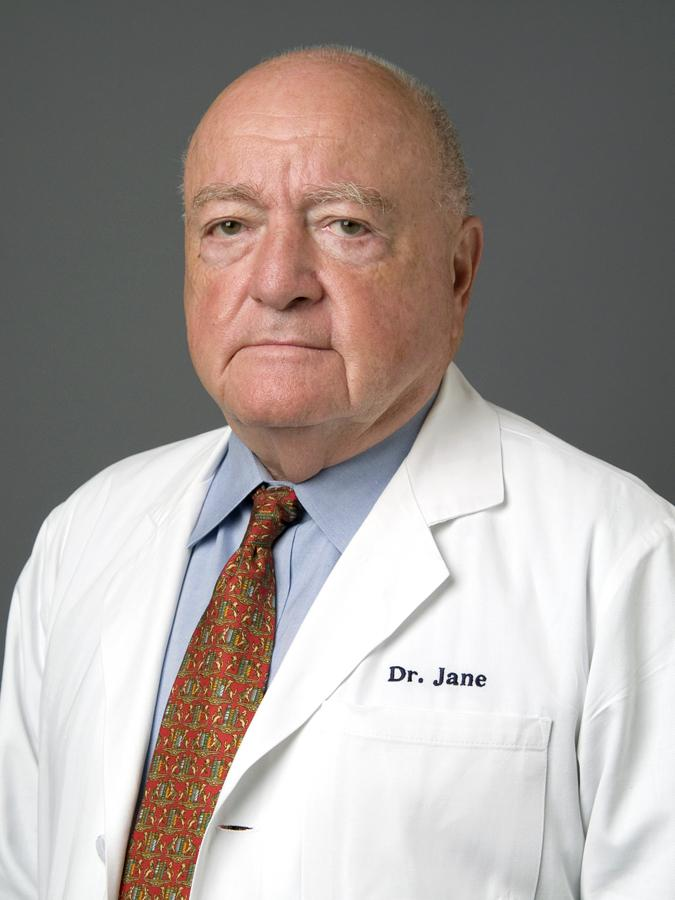
John A. Jane Sr., former editor-in-chief of the Journal of Neurosurgery and spine surgeon for Christopher Reeve

The faculty of the School of Medicine are recognized nationally and internationally. The faculty includes 15 elected members of the Institute of Medicine and National Academy of Sciences; three members of the American Academy of Arts and Sciences; 12 members of the American Association for the Advancement of Science; five recipients of the Virginia Outstanding Faculty Award; four recipients of the Virginia Outstanding Scientist Award; and two recipients of the Virginia Life Achievement Award in Science.

| Name | Notable for |
|---|---|
| Charles David Allis, PhD | Winner of the Breakthrough Prize in Life Sciences for his work in epigenetics and chromatin biology. |
| Paul Brandon Barringer, M.D. | Sixth president of Virginia Tech. Returned to UVA as a Professor of Therapeutics and Pharmacology, and Chair of Physiology. Barringer was president of the University from 1895 to 1903. A residence hall at Virginia Tech and a wing of the University of Virginia West Hospital are named after him. His Barringer Mansion is on the National Register of Historic Places. |
| Robert M. Berne, M.D. | Professor and chair of physiology, pioneered adenosine in cardiovascular function and introduced adenosine as a therapeutic agent in the treatment of supraventricular tachycardia. Berne was elected to the National Academy of Sciences in 1988, and was president of the American Physiological Society. |
| James Lawrence Cabell | Professor of anatomy and surgery. Published "The Testimony of Modern Science to the Unity of Mankind" in 1859, advancing the idea of evolution one year before publication of Darwin's "Origin of Species." Cabell founded the National Board of Health which in 1880 became the U.S. Public Health Service. Cabell was a full professor at the School of Medicine for 52 years (1842–1889) and was an early pioneer of the sanitary preparation of the surgical patient following Lister's principles. |
| Steven T. DeKosky, M.D. | Known for his research in neurology and Alzheimer's Disease. In the 2015 movie Concussion he is played by Eddie Marsan. |
| Fritz E. Dreifuss | Professor of Neurology. Was instrumental in the classification of epileptic seizures and epilepsy syndromes. Was one of the leaders in promotion of Child Neurology as a specific subspecialty. Was president of the American Epilepsy Society. |
| Robley Dunglison, M.D. | Personal physician to Thomas Jefferson and considered the "Father of American Physiology." |
| Richard F. Edlich, M.D., PhD | Recipient of the Distinguished Public Service Award for Contributions to Emergency Medicine by the US Public Health Service, and inventor of several minor surgical tools. |
| Alfred G. Gilman, M.D., PhD | Professor of pharmacology. He discovered G-proteins, cellular mediators of hormone action, for which he received the 1989 Albert Lasker Award and the 1994 Nobel Prize in Physiology or Medicine. |
| Theodore Hough, PhD | Physician who first described delayed onset muscle soreness (DOMS) in 1902. |
| Janine Jagger, PhD | Epidemiologist and director of the International Health Care Worker Safety Center, awarded a MacArthur Fellowship in 2002 for her groundbreaking research on how to protect health care workers from the transmission of blood-borne diseases |
| John A. Jane, M.D | Neurosurgeon and Cushing Medalist, operated on actor Christopher Reeve after a horse-riding accident resulted in cervical vertebral fracture and spinal cord injury. |
| Harvey E. Jordan, PhD, D.Sc. | A distinguished histologist and embryologist, Jordan was the first to suggest that intercalated discs are contraction bands of cardiac muscle and that vascular smooth muscle does not differentiate into striated muscle. A research building on campus bears his name. |
| Eugene M. Landis, M.D | Performed the first direct measurements of capillary pressure and permeability, was professor and head of the Department of Internal Medicine. Editor in Chief of Circulation Research. The Microcirculatory Society awards the Eugene M. Landis Award for. |
| Edward W. Hook Jr., M.D. | Professor and chair of the Department of Medicine, received the Thomas Jefferson Award of the university in 1996. Hook performed pioneering research in infectious disease and initiated the Humanities in Medicine Program. He was president of the American College of Physicians and the American Clinical and Climatological Association. |
| Jonathan Kipnis, PhD | Chair of the department of neuroscience, and discoverer of meningeal lymphatic vessels. |
| Thomas P. Loughran Jr., M.D. | Discoverer and international expert in large granular lymphocytic leukemia. |
| Barry Marshall, M.B.B.S. | Recipient of the 1995 Lasker Award and the 2005 Nobel Prize in Physiology or Medicine for his "discovery of the bacterium Helicobacter pylori and its role in gastritis and peptic ulcer disease." |
| James Q. Miller, M.D. | Neurologist and eponymous Miller–Dieker syndrome. UVA named the James Q. Miller Multiple Sclerosis Clinic for him. |
| William H. Muller Jr., M.D. | Professor and chair of the Department of Surgery. He pioneered the surgical treatment of pulmonary hypertension and invented one of the first artificial aortic valves. Muller was president of the American College of Surgeons and received the Thomas Jefferson Award of the university in 1982. |
| Ferid Murad, M.D., PhD | Professor of medicine, discovered that endothelium-derived relaxing factor is nitric oxide, which acts as a vasodilator by stimulating guanylyl cyclase. Murad received the Albert Lasker Award in 1996 and the 1998 Nobel Prize in Physiology or Medicine for this discovery. |
| William A. Petri, M.D., PhD | Infectious disease physician scientist notable for developing the first FDA-approved human assay and vaccine for Entamoeba histolytica. He leads the Bill & Melinda Gates Foundation's PROVIDE study in Bangladesh and India exploring new solutions for the problem of oral poliovirus and rotavirus vaccine failures in the developing world. |
| Thomas Platts-Mills, M.D., PhD | Allergist and Fellow of the Royal Society. |
| John Lawrence Smith, PhD | Professor of chemistry and material medica, invented the inverted microscope in 1850. He was president of the American Association for the Advancement of Science (1872) and of the American Chemical Society (1877). The J. Lawrence Smith Medal is named for him. |
| Homer William Smith, M.D. | Commonly acknowledged as the founder of modern renal physiology, joined the faculty of physiology in 1925. Smith developed the concepts of clearance methodology for measurement of renal plasma flow and glomerular filtration rate. |
| Ian Stevenson, M.D. | Controversial expert on the academic study of reincarnation and the remembrance of past lives. |
| Michael O. Thorner, M.B.B.S., D.Sc. | Professor of medicine, discovered a new hypothalamic hormone, growth hormone releasing hormone in 1976. Thorner received the 1995 NIH General Clinical Research Centers Award for his work in clinical neuroendocrinology. |
| Jim B. Tucker, M.D. | Noted researcher in paranormal activities |
| Robert R. Wagner, M.D. | Early virologist, studied interferons. |

== Notable alumni ==
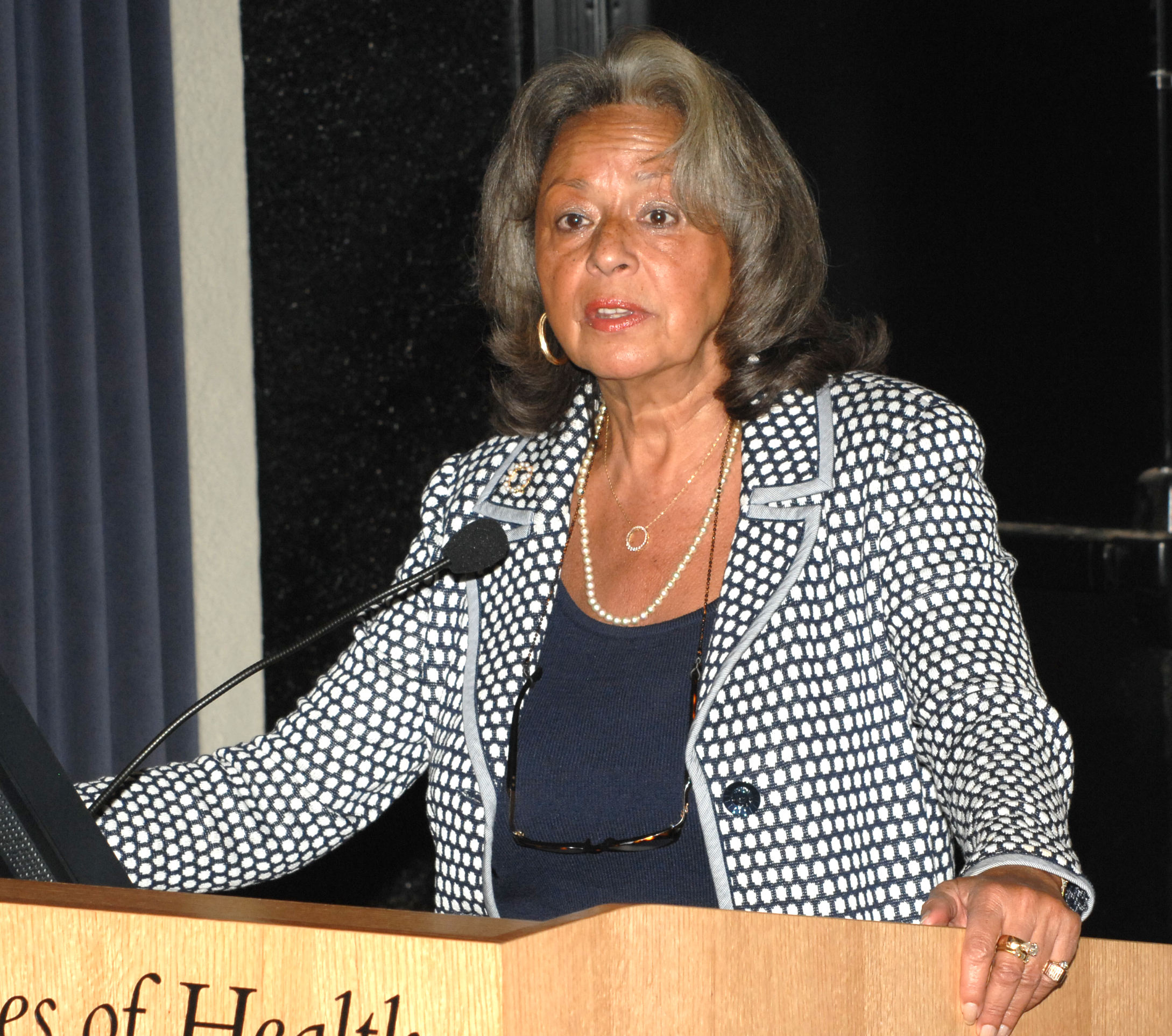
Vivian Pinn, former associate director for research on women's health at the National Institutes of Health (NIH)

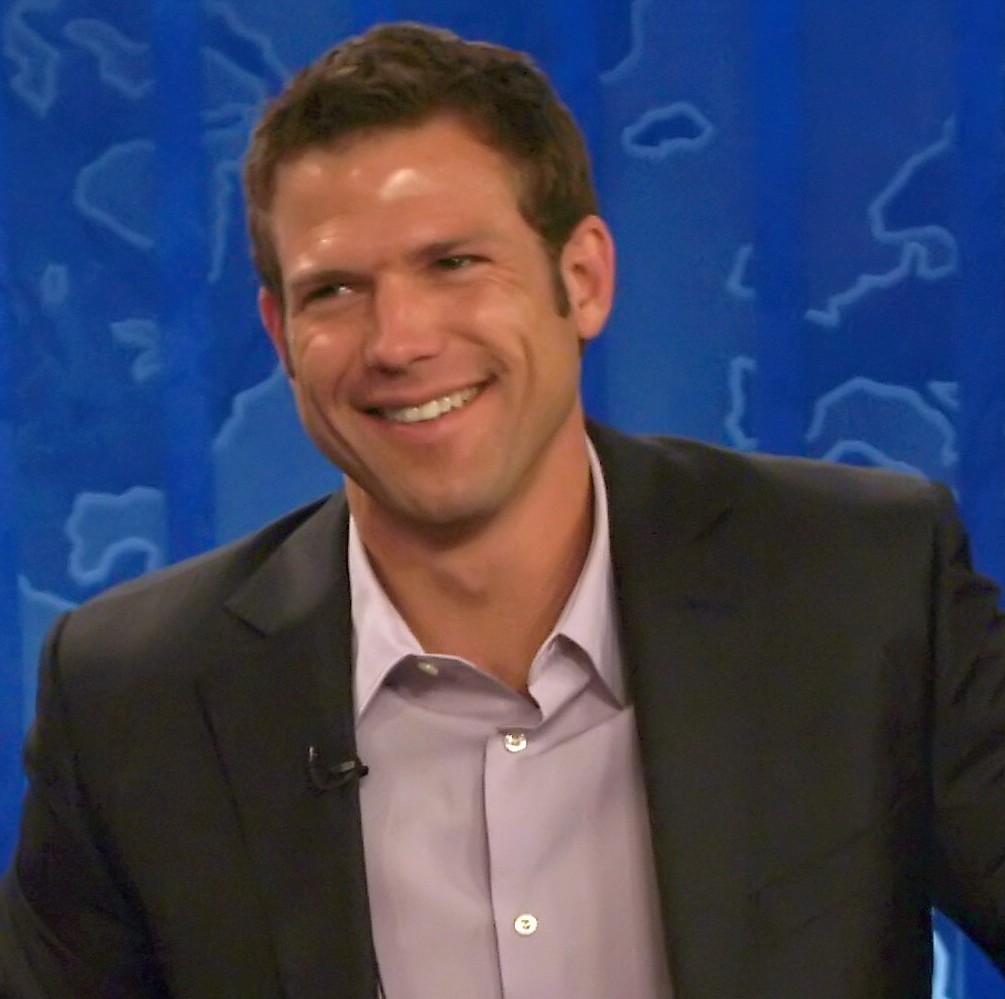
Travis Stork, American television personality from The Bachelor and as the host of the syndicated daytime talk show The Doctors.

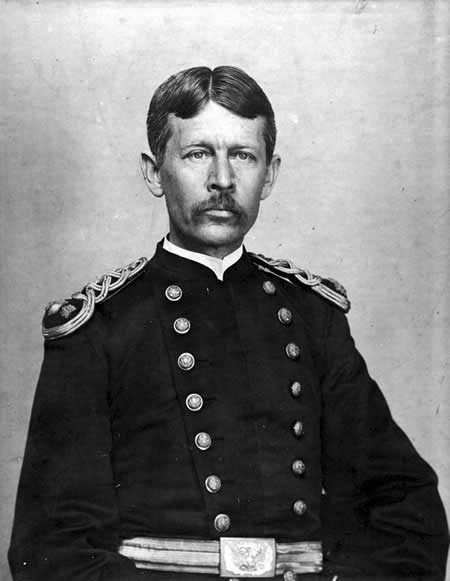
Walter Reed, U.S. Army physician who deduced mosquitos were the vector for yellow fever

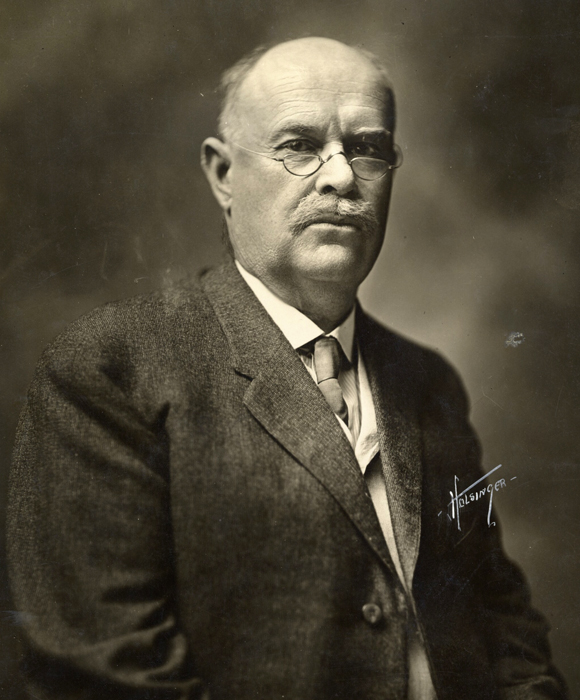
Paul Brandon Barringer, the sixth president of Virginia Tech

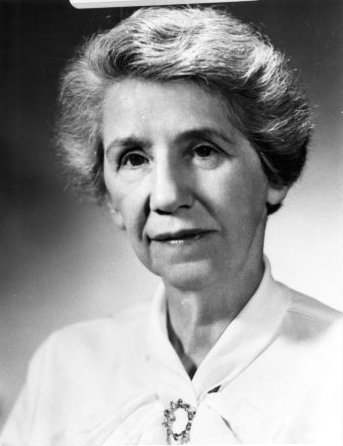
Thelma Brumfield Dunn, NIH pathologist known as "The First Lady of Cancer Research" due to her work on murine tumorigenesis

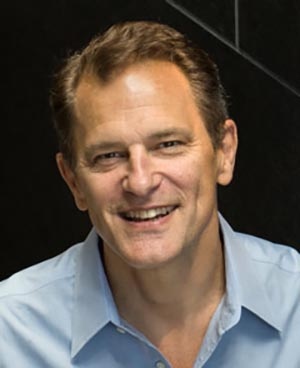
Robert C. Green, director the Genomes2People Research Program at Brigham and Women's Hospital and Harvard Medical School

| Name | Graduated | Notable for |
|---|---|---|
| John F. Anderson | 1895 | Third Director of the National Institutes of Health. |
| Gerald D. Aurbach | 1954 | Aurbach isolated and purified parathyroid hormone, determined that parathyroid hormone acts through cyclic AMP, and demonstrated that pseudohypoparathyroidism is a disorder of the parathyroid hormone receptor complex. Aurbach was a member of the National Academy of Sciences and the chief of the Metabolic Diseases Branch of the National Institutes of Health until his death in 1991. |
| Paul Brandon Barringer | 1877 | Sixth president of Virginia Tech. Returned to UVA as a Professor of Therapeutics and Pharmacology, and Chair of Physiology. Barringer was president of the University from 1895 to 1903. A residence hall at Virginia Tech and a wing of the University of Virginia West Hospital are named after him. His Barringer Mansion is on the National Register of Historic Places. |
| John Britton | 1949 | Physician murdered by anti-abortion extremists, after the murder of his predecessor by anti-abortion extremists. |
| Toby Cosgrove | 1966 | Bronze star Veteran of the Vietnam War, Cardiovascular surgeon, and former CEO and President of Cleveland Clinic |
| Hugh S. Cumming | 1893 | 5th Surgeon General of the United States in 1922–1936, and vice president of the Health Section of the League of Nations. He was a member of the National Academy of Sciences and an honorary fellow of the American College of Surgeons. |
| David M. Eddy | 1968 | Mathematician and healthcare analyst who has done seminal work in mathematical modeling of diseases, clinical practice guidelines, and evidence-based medicine. |
| Mike Fisher | 2003 | Two-time Hermann Trophy winner and former UVA Soccer midfielder. Fisher was chosen second overall in the 1997 MLS College Draft, but instead decided to enroll in the School of Medicine. |
| Wade Hampton Frost | 1903 | Frost established epidemiology as a science. He introduced the cohort theory of tuberculosis and was the founding dean of the Johns Hopkins School of Public Health. |
| Pam Galloway | 1980 | Former member of the Wisconsin Senate. |
| Robert C. Green | 1982 | Neurologist and geneticist. Professor of Medicine at Harvard Medical School. board member of the Council for Responsible Genetics, co-chair of the Steering Committee of the NIH Consortium on Clinical Sequencing Exploratory Research and the Steering Committee of the NIH Consortium in Newborn Sequencing in Genomic Medicine and Public Health, member of the Consortium on Electronic Medical Records and Genomics. |
| Kevin Guskiewicz | 1995 | MacArthur Fellow; awarded a Genius Grant for the study of sports medicine. |
| Sherita Hill Golden | 1994 | Vice President and Chief Diversity Officer at Johns Hopkins Medicine; Endocrinologist specializing in Diabetes |
| J. Hartwell Harrison | 1932 | Harrison carried out the first human organ transplant from a living donor in 1954. He won several awards for his role in kidney transplantation surgery. |
| Kenneth Heilman | 1963 | A leader in the field of Behavioral neurology who founded a dedicated fellowship at the University of Florida responsible for training physicians, psychologists, and others. |
| Charles Taylor Pepper | 1855 | The original inspiration for the Dr Pepper brand, according to the Dr Pepper/Seven Up company. |
| Vivian Pinn | 1967 | Past president of the National Medical Association, the nation's oldest and organization representing African-American physicians and health professionals in the United States. |
| Michael Potter | 1949 | Awarded the Albert Lasker Award for Basic Medical Research in 1984 for "his fundamental research in the genetics of immunoglobulin molecules and for paving the way for the development of hybridomas and monoclonal antibodies". |
| Horace Smithy | 1938 | American cardiac surgeon who performed the first successful mitral valve repair in 1948 |
| Travis Lane Stork | 2003 | American emergency physician and television personality, best known for appearing on The Bachelor, and as the host of the syndicated daytime talk show, The Doctors. |
| Robert L. Sufit | 1976 | A neurologist who specializes in Amyotrophic lateral sclerosis. |
| Walter Reed | 1869 | The youngest student to graduate (age 18) at UVA, he was credited with the discovery of the mosquito as a vector in transmission of Yellow fever. |
| W. Rice Warren | 1916 | The head football coach first at the University of South Carolina and then at the University of Virginia in intermittent years during the 1920s. |
| James W. Watts | 1928 | Neurosurgeon and prominent proponent of the Frontal lobotomy, he operated on Rosemary Kennedy. |
| Hugh H. Young | 1894 | Young graduated with a BS, MA, and MD in just 4 years. Five years later after graduating, Young was made head of the Department of Urological Surgery at Johns Hopkins. His operation for excision of the prostate stands as one of the milestones of modern surgery and urology |

== Deans of the School of Medicine ==
| Name | Tenure |
|---|---|
| Colin Derdeyn, MD* | Sept. 2025-present |
| Melina Kibbe MD | 2021–2025 |
| David S. Wilkes MD | 2015–2021 |
| Randolph J. Canterbury, MD* | 2014–2015 |
| Nancy E. Dunlap, MD, PhD, M.B.A. | 2013–2014 |
| Steven T. DeKosky, MD | 2008–2013 |
| Sharon L. Hostler, MD* | 2007–2008 |
| Arthur Garson Jr., MD | 2002–2007 |
| Robert Munson Carey, MD | 1986–2002 |
| Norman John Knorr, MD | 1977–1986 |
| William Richard Drucker, MD | 1972–1977 |
| Kenneth Raymond Crispell, MD | 1964–1971 |
| Thomas Harrison Hunter, MD | 1953–1964 |
| Vernon William Lippard, MD | 1949–1952 |
| Harvey Ernest Jordan, PhD | 1939–1949 |
| James Carroll Flippin, MD | 1924–1938 |
| Theodore Hough, PhD | 1916–1924 |
| Richard Henry Whitehead, MD | 1905–1916 |

- * = indicates interim Dean.

=== Leadership allegations ===
In September of 2024, a letter of no confidence, signed by 128 faculty members and physicians, was raised against dean Melina Kibbe and CEO of UVA Health Craig Kent, demanding their ousting and replacement. The letter accused Kibbe and Kent of allowing "egregious acts" such as harassment of resident physicians, overcharging patients in favor of profit, and lavish spending on C-suite executives. The letter also asserts that Kibbe and Kent have been pressuring healthcare workers to not report concerns of patient safety, and more generally, that they have ushered in "a culture of fear and retaliation" within the school and health network.

In response to the letter, university president Jim Ryan wrote that "through some of their [the authors'] allegations, they have unfairly — and I trust unwittingly — cast a shadow over the great work of the entire health system and medical school.” The university brought in the law firm, Williams & Connolly, to conduct an investigation into the allegations.

The results of the investigation were not released, however, Kent resigned shortly after the conclusion of the investigation in March 2025. Kibbe resigned in July 2025 after being named as the new president at The University of Texas Health Science Center.

== Medical Scientist Training Program ==
The University of Virginia School of Medicine is one of only 43 NIH funded MD/PhD programs in the country. The program director is Dr. Dean H. Kedes.

=== History ===
According to the handbook provided to all entering students:

The University of Virginia undertook significant expansion of research and training programs in the basic biomedical sciences during the late 1960s and early 1970s. All chairmen of the basic science departments of the School of Medicine were newly appointed during this time, a major new research building was constructed, and individual departments grew several-fold in size and quality. Similar but less dramatic growth followed in the clinical departments. Interest in the training of medical scientists flourished rapidly in this environment, in part because many of the new faculty either had experience with MSTPs or were recent graduates of such programs. Accordingly, an MSTP committee was appointed in 1971 under the leadership of Dr. Robert C. Haynes Jr., and funds were provided by the University to initiate such training. An application for training funds was submitted to the National Institute of General Medical Sciences (NIGMS) in 1972, just prior to the time when the appropriation for such training programs was withdrawn. The application was resubmitted in 1975, and NIH support was first received in 1977 under the future Nobel Laureate, Dr. Alfred G. Gilman.

— History, MSTP Handbook, University of Virginia

As such the program claims two founding dates: 1971 when the MSTP committee was first formed and 1977 when the first students matriculated.

=== Program Directors ===
| Name | Tenure |
|---|---|
| Robert C. Haynes Jr. | 1971–1978 |
| Alfred G. Gilman, MD, PhD | 1978–1981 |
| Thomas E. Thompson, PhD | 1981–1984 |
| Rodney L. Biltonen, PhD | 1984–1993 |
| Steven Gonias, MD, PhD | 1993–1998 |
| Gary K. Owens, PhD | 1998–2014 |
| Dean H. Kedes, MD, PhD | 2014–present |

== See also ==
- List of University of Virginia people
- List of medical schools
- University of Virginia Health System
