= Laurence H. Kedes =

American genetic researcher (1937–2021)

- Kedes in 2014
- Born: Laurence H. Kedes; July 19, 1937; Hartford, Connecticut, U.S.
- Died: January 6, 2021 (aged 83)
- Education: Wesleyan University; Stanford University (BS, 1961; MD, 1962)
- Spouse: Shirley (née Beck) Kedes
- Children: 3
- Awards: John Simon Guggenheim Foundation Fellow; Howard Hughes Medical Institute Investigator; Distinguished Scientist Award of the American Heart Association; Provosts Gold Medal from the University of Messina; Henry N. Neufeld Memorial Award (Israel); Scientific Director of the X PRIZE Foundation; Member, American Society for Clinical Investigation
- Scientific career
- Fields: Molecular Biology; Genetics; Genomics
- Workplaces: Stanford University; University of Southern California

Laurence H. Kedes (July 19, 1937 – January 6, 2021) was an American scientist in the fields of gene expression, genomics, and cellular differentiation. His first faculty position was at Stanford University (1970–1989), where he worked as a professor in the Department of Medicine and focused on basic molecular biology and gene expression. In 1988, the University of Southern California (USC) recruited Kedes to spearhead a campus-wide initiative to strengthen their molecular biology and genetics research programs. At USC, Kedes conceived and developed the Institute of Genetic Medicine, becoming its founding director (1989–2008). During his time at USC, Kedes was also named the William Keck Professor (1988–2009) and served as Chair (1988–2002) of the Department of Biochemistry and Molecular Biology.

== Early life and education ==
Kedes was born in Hartford, Connecticut to Rosalyn and Samuel Kedes along with his younger sister, Judith Kedes (1941–2016). Kedes attended Weaver High School in Hartford, Connecticut, and then earned his BSc in biology from Stanford University in 1961 after completing 3 years (1957-1959) of undergraduate studies at Wesleyan University; a university that later recognized him as a Distinguished Alumnus, awarding him an honorary bachelor's of arts degree (2009). Kedes married Shirley Beck in 1958, and they had three children, Dean Kedes (born 1960), Maureen (born 1962), and Todd (born 1966). Kedes earned his medical degree from Stanford University Medical School (1958-1962) and then completed his internship and junior year of residency in internal medicine at the University of Pittsburgh (1962–1964). He then completed two years of research at the Laboratory of Biochemistry and Biology Branch, within the National Cancer Institute (1964–1966). Following a senior residency year at the Brigham and Women's Hospital, Kedes joined the laboratory of Paul R. Gross at the Massachusetts Institute of Technology, completing his postdoctoral research fellowship. Supported by a Leukemia Society award, he then worked for one year (1969–1970) in Europe with embryologist Alberto Monroy, and molecular biologist Max Birnstiel.

== Career ==
Kedes was recruited by Stanford University (1970–1989), where he was promoted to the rank of full professor and became the institution's first investigator supported by the Howard Hughes Medical Institute (1974–1982). While at Stanford he founded IntelliGenetics (later IntelliCorp), holding the positions of Senior Scientist and Chairmen (1980–1987), the first company focused on designing and applying computer programs, expert systems, and artificial intelligence for the analysis of DNA sequences.

In 1989, Kedes moved to University of Southern California (USC) where he conceptualized, obtained extramural funding for, and oversaw the design and building of the Institute of Genetic Medicine (IGM). The institute followed a collaborative model and Kedes recruited 20 faculty to the IGM during his tenure as its founding director. He also served as Scientific Director and Co-Chair of the Scientific Advisory Board for the Archon X PRIZE in Genomics (2005–2013) and was the Weston Visiting Professor at the Weitzmann Institute (2009).

Following his retirement from USC, Kedes served as Interim Director of Medical Genetics at Cedars Sinai Medical Center (2012–2014).

Kedes authored over 220 papers, reviews, and book chapters. His published work has over 23,000 citations with two papers receiving over 1000 citations each and over 45 receiving over 100 citations each, as of 2016.

== Awards and honors ==
- John Simon Guggenheim Foundation Fellow
- Howard Hughes Medical Institute Investigator
- Member, American Society for Clinical Investigation
- Provosts Gold Medal from the University of Messina (Italy)
- Henry N. Neufeld Memorial Award (Israel)
- University of Southern California Distinguished Faculty Service Award (2004)
- Scientific Director of the X PRIZE Foundation

== Research and scientific contributions ==
Kedes' research focus was skeletal muscle and cardiac muscle molecular genetics [needs citation]. Kedes' research contributions include the first isolation of a protein-coding gene from an animal cell and the determination of the DNA sequence of a protein-coding animal gene. Initially, his research focused on the chromosomal arrangement, sequences, and regulation of the multi-gene family encoding histone proteins, which later played a role in controlling overall gene expression. In a subsequent phase, he investigated the regulation of actin genes, identifying evolutionary conserved elements within non-coding regions of mRNA 3' ends. Kedes predicted that these regions were likely targets of post-transcriptional regulation, a prediction that proved correct (see histone code). (See, for example, microRNA, AU-rich element, three prime untranslated region).

In the third phase of his research, Kedes turned his attention to muscle gene expression, myocyte differentiation, and transdifferentiation, including early forays into cardiac gene therapy. He was also a developer of the first federally funded digital web-based database for storing and analyzing DNA sequences, laying the foundation, along with the Los Alamos National Laboratory, for the development of subsequent NIH databases, including GenBank at the NCBI. To develop systems to analyze increasingly complex sets of DNA databases, Kedes initiated collaborations with fellow Stanford University molecular biologist Douglas Brutlag and computer scientists Peter Friedland and Edward Feigenbaum and sought and obtained federal funding to establish a pre-internet era resource to share openly both the DNA sequence data and the mainframe computer aided analysis software in a program that they named Bionet. Together, the four faculty formed Intelligenetics, which was the first entity that managed Bionet.

== Death ==
On January 6, 2021, Kedes died at age 83, following a period of declining health.
