= Richard F. Edlich =

American plastic surgeon

Richard F. Edlich (January 19, 1939, New York City, New York – December 25, 2013, Brush Prairie, Washington) was a Professor Emeritus of Plastic Surgery, Biomedical Engineering and Emergency Medicine at the University of Virginia Health System. His basic clinical and research interests focused on improving the safety and outcome of wound care in emergency medicine and surgery.

== Biography ==
Edlich was admitted to Lafayette College at age 15 after finishing his sophomore year at Stuyvesant High School in New York City. Three years later, he enrolled as an early admission student at New York University School of Medicine. After graduating in 1970, he began a surgical residency at the University of Minnesota Health Sciences Center and received a Doctorate of Philosophy in Surgery.

== Academic career ==
After Edlich completed his 8-year residency training at the University of Minnesota Hospital, he completed a 2-year plastic surgical residency at the University of Virginia Health Sciences Center. During his time at the University of Virginia School of Medicine, both in his residency and subsequent career, he published hundreds of publications and book chapters on burn care, wound healing, surgical instrument design, and rehabilitation. He began his research career at the University of Virginia Health Sciences Center and was involved in the development of the burn unit and prehospital care service.

=== Emergency medicine ===
He accepted a position as director of an emergency room at the University of Virginia, where he made several advances in emergency care: an emergency medical communication system for ambulances, emergency training for ambulance attendants, a rape crisis center, a crisis center for the deaf, a poison control center, an advanced life support emergency medical system, and the first medical air transport system in the Commonwealth of Virginia.

Edlich was one of eight physician technical advisors for the Department of Emergency Medical Services of the US Department of Health Education and Welfare to develop emergency medical systems throughout the US. He supervised the development of emergency medical systems in the Virginia, Pennsylvania, West Virginia, Maryland, Washington DC, and Puerto Rico. In 1979, Edlich received the Distinguished Public Service Award for Contributions to Emergency Medicine by the US Public Health Service.

== Professional accomplishments ==
- He designed the first adhesive skin closure tape that could approximate wound edges without the use of sutures.
- He developed a skin wound cleanser safe enough to be poured into the patient's eye without toxic effects, a solution of poloxamer 188 that has now been approved for use by the Food and Drug Administration (FDA) and is now marketed as Shur-Clens by Convatec (Skillman, New Jersey).
- He developed the first compact electrosurgical unit.

=== Endoscopy ===
After Edlich learned about endoscopes in Asia, he received an endoscope for gastroscopic visualization of the patient's stomach. As a surgical resident, Edlich was the first physician to do a gastroscopy at the University of Minnesota Medical Center. Edlich's picture was featured on the cover of Postgraduate Medicine, the Journal of Applied Medicine, in November 1968. His experiences with gastroscopy led to the first minimally invasive surgical procedure at the University of Minnesota Hospital, an endoscopic gastrostomy.

Edlich soon realized the limitations of the thick, narrow-diameter latex Ewald tubes that were being used to evacuate blood clots from the patient's stomach before endoscopic examination. Edlich devised a thin-walled, transparent, plastic tube for evacuation of blood clots from a patient's stomach.

=== Ischemic myocardium ===
Edlich helped to quantitate the perfusion of a saphenous vein graft implanted in canine ischemic myocardium using tissue blood flow measurements. When his studies failed to show revascularization of the heart, he suggested that the revascularization of the heart could be improved by a coronary artery bypass graft.

=== Burn and wound healing center ===
Edlich's interest in emergency medical care was complemented by his clinical experience in burn care. After accepting the position as Director of University of Virginia Burn Center, which initially consisted of only two beds, he enlisted the help of benefactors as well as the University of Virginia to develop the 16-bed DeCamp Burn and Wound Healing Center, which included a hyperbaric oxygen treatment system for patients with necrotizing fasciitis and purpura fulminans. He helped to devise a new silver sulfadiazine cream containing poloxamer 188 that exhibits less tissue toxicity than that of the commercially available silver sulfadiazine cream. Edlich devised a new Gram stain technique for quantitative bacteriology using stable iodophors rather than unstable aqueous iodine. This reliable Gram stain technique is now being used throughout the world.

When Edlich treated burn patients in which the patient's ignited clothing was adherent to the burned skin, he was concerned that the adult textiles were highly flammable and became the ignition source for the burn injury. His clinical measurements of fabric flammability of the textiles as well as a careful review of the ignition source documented that flammable liquids, such as gasoline, were the ignition sources of most burn injuries. Consequently, Edlich initiated a nationwide educational program that has dramatically reduced the frequency of burn injuries stemming from flammable liquids.

=== Surgical gloves ===
During his surgical career, Edlich and his team of scientists made important scientific contributions that have protected health care workers as well as operating room personnel. His studies on the toxicity of corn starch became a catalyst for the development of powder-free gloves. His scientific investigation proved conclusively that cornstarch was a dangerous foreign body that potentiated wound infection and was a vector for the latex allergy epidemic.

On September 24, 2008, Edlich and eleven health professionals submitted a Citizen's Petition to the FDA to ban cornstarch on medical gloves (FDA-2008-P-0531). On February 3, 2011, the FDA prepared a Federal Register on the safety and performance of medical gloves with cornstarch, in which healthcare professionals had 60 days to make comments that ultimately led to the FDA's final decision regarding banning cornstarch on medical gloves.

Edlich's studies on a new powder-free double-glove puncture indication system support the use of this double-glove system in surgical procedures in an effort to prevent the spread of deadly blood-borne viral infection (Molnlycke Healthcare, LLC, Norcross, Georgia)

== Afflictions ==
Edlich suffered from multiple sclerosis, and used a wheelchair. At one point, he suffered a broken femur when his wheelchair brake failed.

== Awards ==
Edlich's contributions to teaching and healthcare have been recognized by the following Awards:

- 1990 Thomas Jefferson Award from the University of Virginia
- Distinguished Alumni Award from the University of Minnesota Medical Alumni Association (2005)
- James D. Mills Award from the American College of Emergency Physicians (2008)
- Solomon A. Berson Award in Health Sciences from the New York University School of Medicine (2011).
