= John Jane =

John Jane may refer to:

- John A. Jane, American neurosurgeon
- Fred T. Jane (John Fredrick Thomas Jane), founding editor of reference books on warships and aircraft
