= Evans-Haynes Burn Center =

Geography
- Location: Richmond, Virginia, United States
- Coordinates: 37°32′25.9″N 77°25′44″W

History
- Opened: 1947

Links
- Lists: Hospitals in Virginia

The Evans-Haynes Burn Center at the VCU Medical Center/Virginia Commonwealth University was founded in 1947 and is the oldest civilian burn center in the country. Dr. Everret I. Evans founded the center and was medical director from 1947 to 1954. During Evan's tenure as Burn Director, many advances in burn care were developed including the establishment of the first civilian intensive care unit and the development of the first protocol for fluid resuscitation post burn. He was followed by Dr. Boyd W. Haynes, who directed the unit for 36 years. A succession of MDs have directed the Center since 1990.

In November 2008, the Evans-Haynes Burn Center relocated to the new Critical Care Hospital, 8th Floor. Patient capacity expanded from 12 to 16 beds and the ICU capability doubled. In addition, the unit reformatted to all private rooms for non-acute patients and included an area for family to stay and participate in care. The center averages 600 admissions a year and 2500 outpatient visits per year. The patient population is made up of all ages, from pediatric to geriatric. VCU Medical Center is a Level I trauma center. VCU Burn Center is the only American Burn Association-Verified Burn Center in the Commonwealth of Virginia.

The Evans-Haynes Burn Center serves as a regional resource for the care of acute burns whether they be thermal, chemical, or electrical in nature. The Center uses an interdisciplinary approach to medicine, incorporating doctors, nurses, occupational therapists, psychiatrists, dieticians, and social workers in returning burn survivors to everyday life. The center is supported by the Old Dominion Professional Fire Fighters Burn Foundation.

The Evans-Haynes Burn Center is a training facility for general surgery resident physicians from VCU School of Medicine, University of Virginia School of Medicine, and Virginia Tech Carilion School of Medicine and Research Institute. The center plays a vital role in providing acute burn care training to U.S. Navy Special Forces combat medics. The center holds the only burn surgery fellowship training position in the Commonwealth of Virginia.
