= Steven T. DeKosky =

American physician

- Born: 1947 (age 78–79)
- Education: Bucknell University; University of Florida; Johns Hopkins Hospital; University of Virginia
- Known for: Prolific researcher in Alzheimer’s disease, dementia and traumatic brain injury; former vice president and dean of University of Virginia School of medicine; former director of the Alzheimer Disease Research Center at the University of Pittsburgh; and current deputy director of the Evelyn F. and William L. McKnight Brain Institute of the University of Florida.
- Scientific career
- Workplaces: University of Pittsburgh; University of Virginia School of Medicine; University of Kentucky College of Medicine

Steven T. DeKosky (born 1947) is the Aerts-Cosper Professor of Alzheimer's Research at the University of Florida (UF) College of Medicine, deputy director of UF’s Evelyn F. and William L. McKnight Brain Institute (MBI) and associate director of the 1Florida Alzheimer’s Disease Research Center.

== Education and career ==
After receiving his bachelor's degree from Bucknell University, DeKosky attended UF for graduate studies in neuroscience and psychology. He then graduated from the UF College of Medicine and completed an internship in internal medicine at Johns Hopkins Hospital and a three-year residency in neurology at UF. DeKosky completed a postdoctoral fellowship in neurochemistry at the University of Virginia (UVA).

Before returning to UF in 2015, DeKosky co-founded the Alzheimer’s Disease Center at the University of Kentucky College of Medicine; was division chief of geriatric psychiatry at the University of Pittsburgh and then chair of the department of neurology for eight years. He directed the Alzheimer Disease Research Center at the University of Pittsburgh for 14 years, and served as vice president and dean of University of Virginia School of Medicine.

== Research Interests ==
DeKosky’s basic research has centered on structural and neurochemical changes in human brain in aging and dementia, and the effects of traumatic brain injury (TBI). His clinical and translational research have focused on understanding the genetics, neuropsychiatric symptoms, neuroimaging and treatment and prevention of Alzheimer’s disease (AD). He and his colleagues were first to correlate synapse number in the cortex with cognitive performance in AD patients.

He was an author of the first reports of dementia pugilistica, now termed Chronic Traumatic Encephalopathy (CTE) in American professional football players. In 2015, DeKosky was portrayed by Eddie Marsan in the movie, Concussion.

DeKosky was also a principal investigator in the clinical application of the breakthrough amyloid-imaging agent Pittsburgh Compound B (PiB). He directed an eight-year NIH-funded national multicenter trial to assess whether Ginkgo biloba can prevent or delay onset of dementia in normal elderly adults, the first large study of prevention of dementia/AD.

== Honors and Other Roles ==
DeKosky has served on and led numerous NIH review and advisory committees, and taught and mentored in clinical research training programs sponsored by the National Institute on Aging (NIA) and the National Institute of Neurological Disorders and Stroke (NINDS).

DeKosky is a frequent commentator on AD and brain aging for the press and is a frequent lecturer on AD nationally. He has testified multiple times before U.S. Senate Committees for greater research funding for AD, and has met with government officials in other countries as a consultant and advocate for programs and support for people with dementia.

A fellow of the American College of Physicians, the American Neurological Association and the American Academy of Neurology, DeKosky was elected to the American Board of Psychiatry and Neurology (ABPN) in 2003, and served in various capacities, including revamping the ABPN certification examination of neurologists. He served as the board’s vice president and president of the Neurology Council in 2010.

DeKosky has published over 500 peer-reviewed articles and book chapters and was named among Clarivate Analytics’ 2018 Highly Cited Researchers, recognizing those with the top 1 percent most-cited works in their field between 2006 and 2016.

He serves on the editorial boards of several leading neurology and AD journals and is a reviewer for multiple other journals. DeKosky served two eight-year terms on the Alzheimer’s Association’s Board of Directors, with one term as vice president and five years as chair of their Medical and Scientific Advisory Council. He served a similar role as chair of Alzheimer’s Disease International’s Medical and Scientific Advisory Panel. He has received numerous awards including the Rita Hayworth Award; the Ronald and Nancy Reagan Research Institute Award for outstanding contributions to research, care and advocacy on behalf of Alzheimer’s patients and their caregivers; the NIH Great Teacher Lecturer; the Alzheimer’s Association Zaven Khachaturian Award for contributions to AD research, and the Alzheimer’s Association's Lifetime Achievement Award in 2020.
