= Dean H. Kedes =

American scientist

Dean Hamilton Kedes
- Born: February 20, 1960 (age 66); Stanford, California
- Education: Stanford University (B.S., Biology 1981); Yale University (Ph.D.-MD, 1988)
- Children: 2
- Awards: Howard Hughes Medical Institute Research Physician Scientist Award; Doris Duke Clinical Scientist Award; Pew Scholar in the Biomedical Sciences
- Scientific career
- Fields: Virology

Dean Hamilton Kedes (born February 20, 1960) is an American scientist in the field of virology and former director of the medical scientist training program at the University of Virginia school of medicine.

== Education ==
Kedes was born in 1960 to Shirley and Laurence H. Kedes. He earned a BS in biology from Stanford University where he conducted neurobiology research under Eric Shooter. Following completion of his undergraduate degree, Kedes matriculated into the MD-PhD track at Yale University School of Medicine, obtaining his dual degrees in 1988. His thesis was on pre-mRNA splicing completed under Joan A. Steitz. Kedes returned to Stanford University to do a residency in internal medicine from 1988-1991. In 1992 he completed an infectious disease fellowship at University of California San Francisco. From 1993-1996 he held a post doctoral position under Donald Ganem where he was awarded a Howard Hughes Medical Institute Post-doctoral Physician Scientist fellowship.

== Career ==
Kedes was recruited to the University of Virginia in 1999. He was promoted to associate professor in 2004 and full professor in 2015. He is currently a professor in the Department of Microbiology, Immunology, and Cancer Biology as well as in Medicine, Division of Infectious Diseases and International Health. In 2014 he was selected to head the university's medical scientist training program following the 16-year tenure of previous director Gary K. Owens.

== Research ==
Kedes' lab focuses on the pathogenesis of Kaposi's sarcoma-associated herpesvirus, including isolation and characterization of viral genes and their protein products; determination of the protein composition, spatial arrangement and assembly of viral and subviral particles; identification of the cell types initially infected during primary transmission in humans; and the connection between viral and human genomes during chronic infection.

Kedes has received a Doris Duke Clinical Scientist Award, a Pew Scholarship in the Biomedical Sciences, and the Elizabeth Glaser Pediatric AIDS Basic Science Award. His work has been supported by grants from the National Institutes of Health since 2000.

== Key papers ==
- Renne R, Zhong W, Herndier B, et al. Lytic growth of Kaposi's sarcoma-associated herpesvirus (human herpesvirus 8) in culture. Nature Medicine. 1996;2(3):342-346.
- Kedes DH, Operskalski E, Busch M, Kohn R, Flood J, Ganem D. The seroepidemiology of human herpesvirus 8 (Kaposi's sarcoma-associated herpesvirus): distribution of infection in KS risk groups and evidence for sexual transmission. Nature Medicine. 1996;2(8):918-924.
- Martin JN, Ganem DE, Osmond DH, Page-Shafer KA, Macrae D, Kedes DH. Sexual Transmission and the Natural History of Human Herpesvirus 8 Infection. New England Journal of Medicine. 1998;338(14):948-954.
- Parsons CH, Adang LA, Overdevest J, et al. KSHV targets multiple leukocyte lineages during long-term productive infection in NOD/SCID mice. Journal of Clinical Investigation. 2006;116(7):1963-1973.
- Adang LA, Parsons CH, Kedes DH. Asynchronous Progression through the Lytic Cascade and Variations in Intracellular Viral Loads Revealed by High-Throughput Single-Cell Analysis of Kaposi's Sarcoma-Associated Herpesvirus Infection. Journal of Virology. 2006;80(20):10073-10082.
- Hassman, L.H., Ellison, T.J., Kedes, D.H. KSHV infects a subset of human tonsillar B cells, driving proliferation and plasmablast differentiation. Journal of Clinical Investigation. 2011, 121(2): 752–768 PMID 21245574.
- Woodson, E.N., Anderson, M.A., Loftus, M.S., and Kedes, D.H. Progressive accumulation of activated ERK2 within highly stable ORF45-containing nuclear complexes promotes lytic gammaherpesvirus infection 2014 PLoS Pathogen. 10(4): e1004066.

== See also ==
- UVa MSTP
