= Edward W. Hook =

Edward Watson Hook, Jr (1924–1998) was an academic physician and international expert in infectious diseases.

He attended Wofford College, Yale University, and Emory University School of Medicine, receiving his medical degree in 1949. After completing his residency and two years of fellowship in bacteriology at Emory University and four years of residency at the University of Minnesota and at Grady Hospital in Atlanta, he joined the Johns Hopkins Infectious Diseases group in 1956. At Johns Hopkins, Ed worked primarily on the influenza virus and salmonella infection.

In 1964, he became a professor of infectious disease at Cornell University Medical College. In 1969, Hook was recruited to the University of Virginia to be a professor of medicine and chair of the department of internal medicine, a position he held for more than 20 years.

Hook was a founding member and president of the Infectious Diseases Society of America. He also served as president of the Association of Professors of Medicine, American Clinical and Climatological Association, and American College of Physicians. He was an elected fellow of the Institute of Medicine. In 1996, he received the Thomas Jefferson Award from the University of Virginia, one of its highest honors.

Hook died of a heart attack while attending a conference in Pennsylvania in 1998.

Hook was married in 1949 to Jessie Thurecht, who died in 2014. They had four children, one of whom is an infectious disease physician.
