= Robert C. Green =

American geneticist

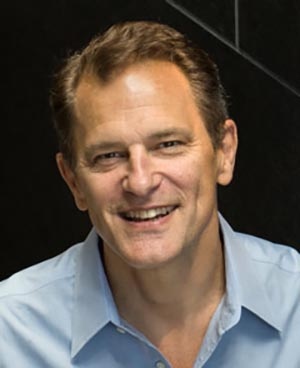
- Born: Richmond, Virginia, U.S.
- Education: Amherst College; University of Virginia School of Medicine; Emory University
- Scientific career
- Workplaces: Brigham and Women's Hospital; Harvard Medical School

Robert C. Green is an American medical geneticist, physician, and public health researcher. He directs the Genomes2People Research Program in translational genomics and health outcomes and is the Director of Preventive Genomics Clinic at the Division of Genetics at Brigham and Women's Hospital and the Broad Institute. Research led by Green includes clinical and research aspects of genomic and precision medicine, including the development and disclosure of Alzheimer's disease risk estimates (the REVEAL Study) and one of the first prospective studies of direct-to-consumer genetic testing services (the PGen Study). He has studied the implementation of medical sequencing in healthy adults (the MedSeq Project), newborns (the BabySeq Project), and active duty military personnel (the MilSeq Project). As of 2020, he is leading the first research collaboration to explore return of genomic results and better understand penetrance in a population-based cohort of underrepresented minorities. He has led the Preventive Genomics Clinic at Brigham and Women's Hospital since its creation in 2019.

== Education ==
Green was born in Richmond, Virginia, and received an undergraduate degree from Amherst College in 1976, and then attended the University of Virginia School of Medicine, and earned a Master's of Public Health in Epidemiology from Emory University School of Public Health. He completed a residency in neurology at Harvard Medical School's Longwood Neurology Program, and research fellowships at Beth Israel Deaconess Medical Center and Boston Children's Hospital. Green is board-certified in neurology and medical genetics. He was previously on the faculty at Emory University School of Medicine and the Boston University School of Medicine.

== Genomic research projects and contributions ==
Green served as principal investigator of the Risk Evaluation and Education for Alzheimer's Disease (REVEAL) Study, which explored the behavioral, and health-related impact of disclosing genetic risk for Alzheimer's disease. The study was a series of multi-site, randomized, controlled clinical trials that provide empirical data to address ethical, social and translational issues in genetic susceptibility testing for common diseases.

Green also co-led (with J. Scott Roberts, Ph.D.) the Impact of Personal Genomics (PGen) Study, one of the first to investigate the characteristics of consumers; the behavioral and health impact; and the translational and social issues associated with personal genomic testing services. He co-led the incidental findings working group for the American College of Medical Genetics and Genomics and was lead author on the controversial recommendations for reporting incidental and secondary findings in clinical exome and genome sequencing. Green also contributed to the design of a variant classification pipeline, and a single page summary for reporting clinically relevant results of whole genome sequencing to physicians.

Green currently leads and co-leads the first NIH funded randomized trials of sequencing in adults (MedSeq Project), newborns (BabySeq Project), and active duty US military personnel (MilSeq Project). With continuous funding from NIH for 26 years, he has published more than 300 papers with an h index of 90.

Green co-chaired the steering committee of both the Clinical Sequencing Exploratory Research program (18 NIH grants, over 300 investigators), and the steering committee of the Newborn Sequencing in Genomic Medicine and Public Health program (4 NIH grants, over 100 investigators). He is a currently a co-investigator on the Boston site within the Electronic Medical Records and Genomics Network (eMERGE). He is Associate Director for Research of Partners HealthCare Personalized Medicine, and is leading the development of protocols for return of genomic results for the All of Us (initiative) Research Program of the United States Precision Medicine Initiative and the Google/Verily Project Baseline Study.

=== Genomes2People ===
Genomes2People (G2P) is a research program based at Mass General Brigham, Broad Institute, Ariadne Labs, and Harvard Medical School that conducts research on translational genomics, precision medicine, and health outcomes. It was founded by Green in 2011. The program investigates the medical, behavioral, and economic impacts of integrating genomic information for adults and children into clinical care and public health.

G2P has received over $70 million from the National Institutes of Health (NIH) and other partners to support multiple large-scale studies and clinical trials.

== Professional Affiliations and Awards ==
Green is the founding director of the Brigham Preventive Genomics Clinic. He is Associate Director for Research of Partners HealthCare Personalized Medicine and a member of the executive committee for the Partners BioBank. He is a board member of the Council for Responsible Genetics. He was previously co-chair of the steering committee of the NIH Consortium in Newborn Sequencing in Genomic Medicine and Public Health (NSIGHT). Green is a member of the Consortium on Electronic Medical Records and Genomics (eMERGE). He served on the Institute of Medicine Committee on the "Evidence Base for Genetic Testing," and has collaborated on research studies with Illumina (company), 23andMe, Pathway and Google.

Green received the 2014 Coriell Award for Scientific Achievement in Personalized Medicine. BIS Research named Green one of the 25 most influential voices in precision medicine in 2019.
