= Toby Cosgrove =

American Vietnam War veteran and heart surgeon (born 1940)

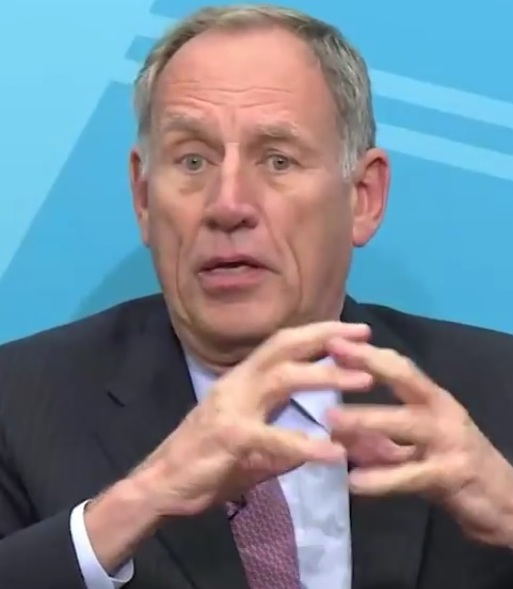
- Born: Delos Marshall Cosgrove; 1940 (age 85–86); Watertown, New York, U.S.
- Education: Williams College (BA); University of Virginia (MD)
- Occupations: Cardiothoracic surgeon, corporate executive
- Years active: 1975-present (active surgery until 2006)
- Spouse: Anita (divorced)
- Children: 2 adult daughters

Delos Marshall "Toby" Cosgrove (born 1940) is an American cardiothoracic surgeon, corporate executive, and a decorated Vietnam War veteran. He served as the president and chief executive of the Cleveland Clinic from 2004 until 2017. He is a pioneer in heart valve reconstruction and an inventor holding 31 patents for devices for improving cardiac outcomes.

== Early life ==
Toby Cosgrove was born in 1940 in Watertown, New York and graduated from Williams College, where he majored in history. He received an MD from the University of Virginia School of Medicine. He was an intern at the Massachusetts General Hospital, the Boston Children’s Hospital, and Brook General Hospital in London, U.K.

Having been an avid and accomplished sailor from a young age, he served as a crew member aboard Nerftiti during the New York Yacht Club's 1962 and 1964 America's Cup Defender Trials.

== Military Service ==
During the Vietnam War, Cosgrove served as a surgeon in the United States Air Force in Da Nang, Vietnam as the chief of the US Air Force Casualty Staging Flight. He was awarded the Bronze Star Medal and the Republic of Vietnam Commendation Medal for medical services given to Vietnamese Civilians.

== Surgical Career, Innovations, and Patents ==
Dr. Cosgrove joined the Cleveland Clinic in 1975 From 1989 to 2004, he served as the Chairman of the Department of Thoracic and Cardiovascular Surgery. Under his 15-year leadership as chairman, he pioneered transparent clinical metrics, advanced minimally invasive surgical programs, and increased its operational capacity.

While leading the Department of Thoracic and Cardiovascular Surgery, Cosgrove initiated public reporting for procedural volumes, morbidity statistics, and mortality metrics beginning in the mid-1990s.

During his active surgical career, Cosgrove performed over 22,000 surgical procedures He served as the president of the American Association of Thoracic Surgery in 2000. He is a member of the Society of Thoracic Surgeons, the American College of Surgeons, and the American Heart Association. He also became a member of the Institute of Medicine in 2013.

Dr Cosgrove's clinical and research highlights include:

- Valve Repair Specialization: Cosgrove improved techniques in heart valve repair, particularly mitral valve reconstruction, and preserving native heart structures rather than replacing them whenever possible
- Academic Contributions and Publications: Cosgrove is an author of over 414 peer-reviewed publications, publishing extensively in core surgical literature, including The Journal of Thoracic and Cardiovascular Surgery (JTCVS) and The Annals of Thoracic Surgery..
- Patent Portfolio and Areas of Innovation: Cosgrove holds 31 patents. His innovations include:
  - Minimally Invasive Surgical Devices: Specialized clamps, tissue retraction mechanisms, and low-profile instruments designed to minimize surgical trauma
  - Valvular Repair and Annuloplasty: Advanced heart valve holders, suture-guiding templates, and flexible annuloplasty rings engineered to prevent suture looping and support native valve reconstruction
  - Perfusion and Cannulation Systems: Specialized venous return cannulae with enhanced drainage features, low-velocity aortic infusion components, and low-prime cardiopulmonary bypass circuits utilizing vacuum-assisted venous drainage
  - Tissue Occlusion and Ablation Systems: Clamping devices and delivery templates designed to securely occlude structures like the left atria appendage with tissue-engaging surfaces that promote healing and cellular ingrowth

== Cleveland Clinic President and CEO (2004-2017) ==
In 2004, Dr Cosgrove succeeded Floyd Loop as President and CEO of the Cleveland Clinic. Over his 13-year tenure, annual revenue grew from $3.7 billion to $8.5 billion, and annual patient visits increased from 2.8 million to 7.1 million. The number of employee caregivers grew from 32,000 to 53,000.

Under Cosgrove's term, the Cleveland Clinic's ares of expansion and innovation include:

- Infrastructure and Regional Expansion: Cosgrove oversaw major capital projects on the main campus, including the 2008 opening of the Sydell and Arnold Millar Family Pavilion and Glickman Tower, which added 1 million square feet and 100 beds. Regional operations expanded through the 2015 integration of Akron General, the 2016 opening of Cleveland Clinic Avon Hospital, the 2017 debut of the 377,000-square-foot Taussig Cancer Center, and the opening of a 60-bed Rehabilitation Hospital in Beachwood, Ohio.
- Global Initiatives: International and out-of-state operations grew through the 2007 opening of Cleveland Clinic Canada in Toronto, the 2009 launch of the Lou Ruvo Center for Brain Health in Las Vegas, and the 2015 opening of the Cleveland Clinic Abu Dhabi.
- Institute-Based Reorganization: Beginning in 2006, Cosgrove restructured the organization from traditional departments into 27 disease- and organ-system specific institutes. This model integrated clinical practices, research, and education across multidisciplinary teams centered on patient conditions.
- Patient Experience and Quality Initiatives: Under the "Patients First" initiative, Cosgrove established the Office of Patient Experience and instituted compulsory empathy training for caregivers. Centers for Medicare and Medicaid Services (CMS) patient satisfaction scores reached the top 8% of domestic hospitals by 2013.
- Employee Wellness and Preventive Health: Cosgrove and his administration implemented wellness policies across the health system, including campus-wide smoking prohibitions and the removal of trans fats from dining menus. Drug screening that began with anesthesiologists in 2008 grew into organization-wide screening of all employees in 2016 with the goal of a drug-free workplace.
- Philanthropy and Research Funding: At the conclusion of his tenure in 2017, Cosgrove launched the Cosgrove Transformation Campaign, securing over $50 million dedicated to research, medical education, and patient experience programs.

Cosgrove was offered the position of Secretary of the United States Department of Veterans Affairs by President Barack Obama in 2014, but declined. He was interviewed for the same position by president-elect Donald Trump in December 2016. At that time Cosgrove joined a business forum assembled by president-elect Donald Trump to provide strategic and policy advice on economic issues.

== Controversies and Obstacles While Head of the Cleveland Clinic ==
=== Disclosure Policy and Conflict of Interest ===
Implementation of Dr. Cosgrove's patents and ties to medical device companies (the atrial fibrillation technology company Atricure Inc in particular) drew scrutiny over potential conflicts of interest at the Cleveland Clinic, prompting policies for disclosing physician-industry relationships. That controversy led to updated guidelines within the organization regarding potential conflicts in research and patient treatment, while increasing openness concerning clinician-corporate relationships. Conflict-of-Interest disclosure is now mandatory at universities, teaching hospitals and research institutions nationwide and requires accountability from the industry side as well.

=== Random Drug Testing and Nonsmoking Requirement of Employees and Smoking Public Spaces ===
Random drug testing of health care workers is controversial and American Medical Association's policy stands that testing should be done for cause and not randomly as does the ACLU. Controversy over the ban on tobacco use was in part based on smoking patterns and socio-economic status, as well as concerns over intrusion into private behaviors.

Tobacco and drug screening of employees remain policy for employment at the Cleveland Clinic today. In 2006, the Cleveland Clinic sponsored a statewide effort to ban smoking in public spaces. The initiative passed and likewise remains in effect today.

== Honors and Awards ==
In addition to his military honors, Dr. Cosgrove has been recognized with numerous professional and academic awards. He's received three honorary Doctor of Science degrees (D.Sc) from Clarkson University, Cleveland State University and Case Western Reserve University.

His additional honors and awards include:

- Member, Royal College of Surgeons, Ireland
- Member, National Academy of Medicine
- Member, Horatio Alger Society
- Fellow, National Academy of Inventors
- Fortune Business Person of the Year
- Castle Connolly National Physician of the Year
- Woodrow Wilson Center Award for Public Service
- Modern Healthcare's "100 Most Influential People in Healthcare"
- Ray C. Catfish Award for Scientific Achievement from the Texas Heart Institute.
- Linus Pauling Award from the Institute for Functional Medicine
- Cleveland Heritage Medal
- Maltz Heritage Award
- Cleveland Medical Hall of Fame
- Cleveland Magazine Business Hall of Fame
- Cleveland Clinic Master Clinician Award
- Cleveland Clinic Innovator of the Award
- Cleveland Clinic Learner Humanitarian Award
- Cleveland Medical Hall of Fame

== Personal life ==
Cosgrove was previously married to Anita, with whom he shares two adult daughters. He is dyslexic.

== Works ==
- Cosgrove, Toby (2014). The Cleveland Clinic Way: Lessons in Excellence From One of the World's Leading Healthcare Organizations. New York: McGraw-Hill Education. ISBN 9780071827249. OCLC 862041447.
