= Eugene M. Landis =

American biologist

- Born: August 14, 1901; Pennsylvania, United States
- Died: 1987 (aged 85–86)
- Education: University of Pennsylvania
- Scientific career
- Workplaces: University of Virginia School of Medicine; Harvard Medical School

Eugene Markley Landis (August 14, 1901 – 1987) was a professor of medicine and noted vascular physiology researcher.

Landis was born in New Hope, PA on August 14, 1901. His father was a biology teacher.

He received four diplomas from the University of Pennsylvania; AB in 1922, MS in 1924, MD in 1926, and PhD in 1927. He began doing research in zoology as an undergraduate student and did physiology research on capillary pressure and permeability as a medical student. After his PhD, we went abroad for a research fellowship in Copenhagen and London.

He returned to the United States and worked as a professor of medicine at the University of Pennsylvania. He became chairman of medicine at University of Virginia School of Medicine in 1939, and professor of physiology at Harvard Medical School in 1943. He retired in 1967.

Landis served as president of the American Society for Clinical Investigation in 1942 and as president of the American Physiological Society in 1952. He served as Editor-in-Chief of Circulation Research. He was elected to the National Academy of Sciences in 1954.

Landis died in 1987. He was married and had one daughter.

In 1969, the Microcirculatory Society began awarding the Eugene M. Landis Research Award.
