= Michael O. Thorner =

- Michael Thorner when he was Chair of the Department of Medicine at the University of Virginia School of Medicine, 1997.
- Education: University of London (MBBS)
- Occupation: Professor Emeritus of Internal Medicine
- Employer: University of Virginia

Michael O. Thorner is David C. Harrison Professor Emeritus of Internal Medicine at the University of Virginia specializing in endocrinology and metabolism. He was previously the chief of the division of endocrinology and metabolism and the chair of the department of internal medicine.

== Education and career ==
Thorner graduated with an MBBS from Middlesex Hospital at the University of London in 1970. He was a lecturer at St Bartholomew's Hospital at the University of London from 1974 to 1977.

He joined the faculty of the University of Virginia as an associate professor in 1977, and was promoted to full professor in 1982. He held positions as the Kenneth R. Crispell Professor of Medicine (1990-1998), Henry B Mulholland Professor of Internal Medicine (1996-2006), David C. Harrison Medical Teaching Professor of Internal Medicine (2006-2014). He was director of the General Clinical Research Center (1984-1997), chief of the division of endocrinology and metabolism (1986-1998), and chair of the department of medicine (1997-2006). He retired in 2014.

== Research ==
Robert MacLeod's discovery that dopamine is the hormone responsible for inhibiting prolactin release led to Thorner being recruited to UVA to join in the research. He continued this work to develop treatment for prolactin-secreting pituitary tumors to restore normal prolactin levels and reduction the size of the tumor by using dopamine agonists. This is now the standard of care for patients with prolactin-secreting tumors.

His work on human growth hormone was the basis of Merck's drug MK-677, which increases muscle mass in elderly adults and helps prevent frailty-related injuries. He was the chair of the National Institute on Aging Advisory Panel on Testosterone Replacement in Men (2000). In 2013, he received the highest award of the Endocrine Society, the Koch Medal.

== Awards ==
He has been honored with several awards, including:

- 1988 Virginia’s Outstanding Scientist Award
- 1984 Albion O. Bernstein Award, NY Medical Association
- 1992 Edwin B. Astwood Award, Endocrine Society
- 1995 GCRC Program Seventh Annual Award for Excellence in Clinical Research
- 1995 Pituitary Society Annual Award for Contributions to Understanding Pituitary Disease
- 1996 Theodore E. Woodward Award, American Clinical and Climatological Association
- 1999 John Phillips Memorial Award, American College of Physicians
- 1999 Bristol-Myers Squibb Unrestricted Gift Metabolic Research Gift Recipient
- 2000 Endocrine Society Distinguished Physician Award
- 2009 Dale Medal, British Endocrine Society
- 2013 Fred Conrad Koch Award, Endocrine Society
- 2024 Human Growth Foundation Lifetime Achievement Award

He is an elected fellow of the American Society for Clinical Investigation in 1983, the Royal College of Physicians, the Association of American Physicians, and the American Clinical and Climatological Association and was elected Fellow of the American Academy of Arts and Sciences in 2000.
