= Paul Barringer =

Paul Barringer may refer to:

- Paul Barringer (born 1778), politician who served in the North Carolina House of Commons and Senate
- Paul Barringer (attorney), member-elect of the U.S. House of Representatives for North Carolina's 13th district
- Paul Brandon Barringer, sixth president of Virginia Tech
