= Vivian Pinn =

American pathologist

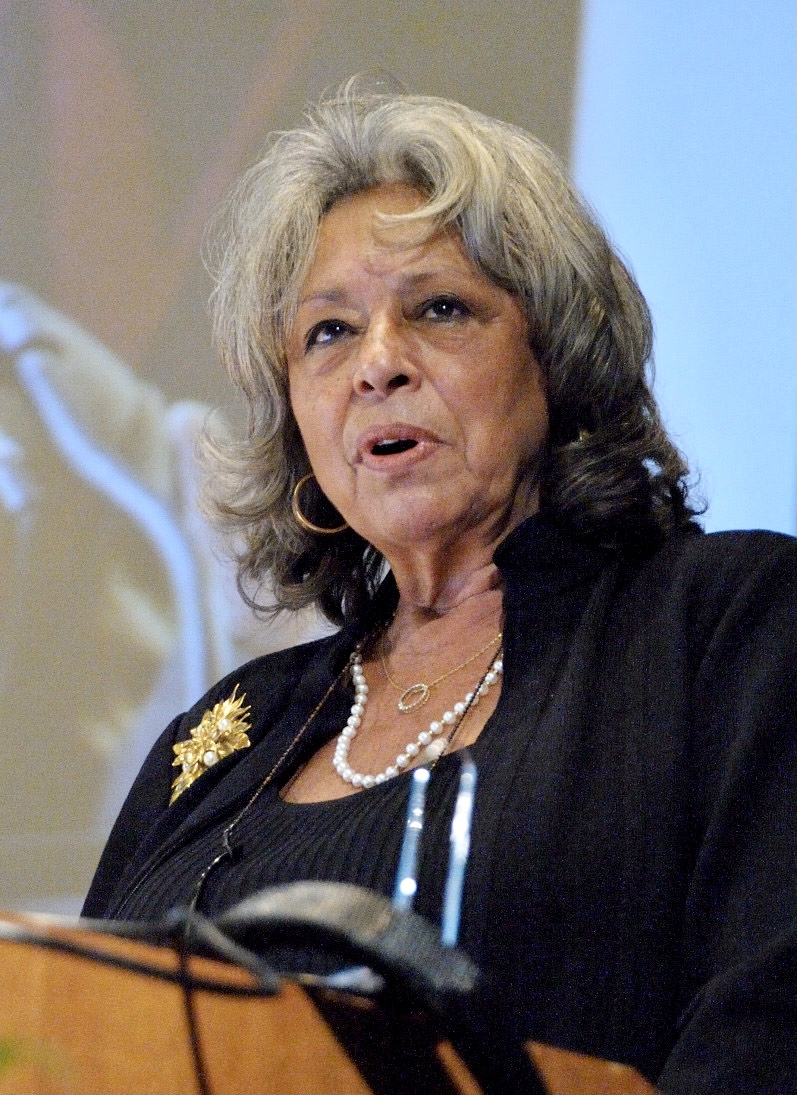
- Pinn in 2010
- Born: Vivian Winona Pinn; 1941 (age 84–85); Halifax, Virginia
- Education: University of Virginia School of Medicine Wellesley College
- Scientific career
- Fields: Pathology; Women's Health
- Workplaces: Fogarty International Center; Howard University College of Medicine; National Institutes of Health; Tufts University School of Medicine

Vivian Winona Pinn (born 1941) is an American physician-scientist and pathologist known for her advocacy of women's health issues and concerns, particularly for ensuring that federally funded medical studies include female patients, as well as encouraging women to follow medical and scientific careers. She served as associate director for research on women's health at the National Institutes of Health (NIH), concurrently was the inaugural director of NIH's Office of Research on Women's Health. Pinn previously taught at Harvard University, Tufts University, and Howard University College of Medicine. Since retiring from NIH in 2011, Pinn has continued working as a senior scientist emerita at the Fogarty International Center.

== Early life and education ==
Vivian Winona Pinn was born in 1941 on a farm in Halifax, Virginia. She attended segregated schools in Lynchburg. From the age of 4, Pinn was interested in a medical career, especially since she assisted both sets of her grandparents with their health concerns (including some insulin injections) and observed the relief they experienced after a doctor visit. The daughter and granddaughter of teachers, Pinn's family encouraged her to study hard so that she could reach her goals. Pinn graduated from high school as valedictorian of her class. Considering her education beyond high school, Pinn explored a wide variety of options, including DePauw and Wellesley, and decided on Wellesley College, the last acceptance letter she received.

Pinn won a scholarship to Wellesley College, earning a Bachelor of Arts in zoology in 1962. She took a leave of absence from college during sophomore year to care for her mother, who was ailing from a metastatic bone tumor; the cancer had been erroneously diagnosed as arthritis. In the wake of her mother's diagnosis, treatment, and eventual death from the disease, Pinn's desire to become a doctor was cemented. Based upon her mother's experience, she resolved to listen to her patients, pay attention to their complaints, and be open-minded about practicing medicine.

In 1967, Pinn earned a medical degree from the University of Virginia School of Medicine, where she was the only woman and only African-American student in her class. Pinn planned to become a pediatrician until she took a summer internship position as a research assistant at Massachusetts General Hospital. She worked there throughout medical school, with Benjamin Barnes and Martin Flax, in the areas of experimental transplant surgery and immunopathology. That training spurred her lifelong interests in research and academic medicine, forming the basis for Pinn's eventual career in renal and transplant pathology. She completed a residency in pathology at Mass General while serving as a teaching fellow at Harvard Medical School.

== Pathology career ==
In 1970, Pinn joined the pathology department at Tufts University School of Medicine, where she served as assistant professor and assistant dean of student affairs. Her 12 years there were recognized by Tufts over the subsequent decades with numerous honors and awards.

Pinn joined the staff and faculty of Howard University Hospital in 1982, serving as professor and chair of the pathology department. At the time of her appointment, Pinn became the third woman and the first African-American woman to lead a U.S. pathology department.

In 1989, Pinn was installed as president of the National Medical Association (NMA). NMA is the nation's oldest and largest organization representing African-American physicians and health professionals in the United States. Established in 1895, the NMA is the collective voice of more than 30,000 African-American physicians and the patients they serve.

== Women's health at the NIH ==
In 1991, Pinn was appointed as first director of the new Office of Research on Women's Health (ORWH) at the National Institutes of Health (NIH) and first permanent NIH associate director of research on women's health. The ORWH was established in September 1990 to strengthen and enhance NIH's efforts to improve the prevention, diagnosis, and treatment of illnesses in women, and to enhance research related to diseases and conditions that affect women. The office helps establish NIH goals and policies for women's health issues and assures that all appropriate clinical trials include the participation of women.

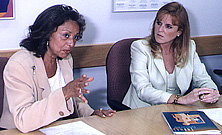
In 1998, Pinn briefed Sarah, Duchess of York, on medical research topics regarding women

In her 20 years as ORWH director, Pinn employed her position as a federal policymaker to raise awareness of women's health issues and underrepresentation in science and medicine worldwide, across educational, political and cultural communities. She became known for her advocacy of women's health issues and concerns, particularly for ensuring that federally funded medical studies include female patients, and well as encouraging women to follow medical and scientific careers.

At NIH in 1998, Pinn briefed Sarah, Duchess of York, on medical research topics and major health messages regarding women. Information was shared on the Women's Health Initiative, obesity, breast cancer, and osteoporosis.

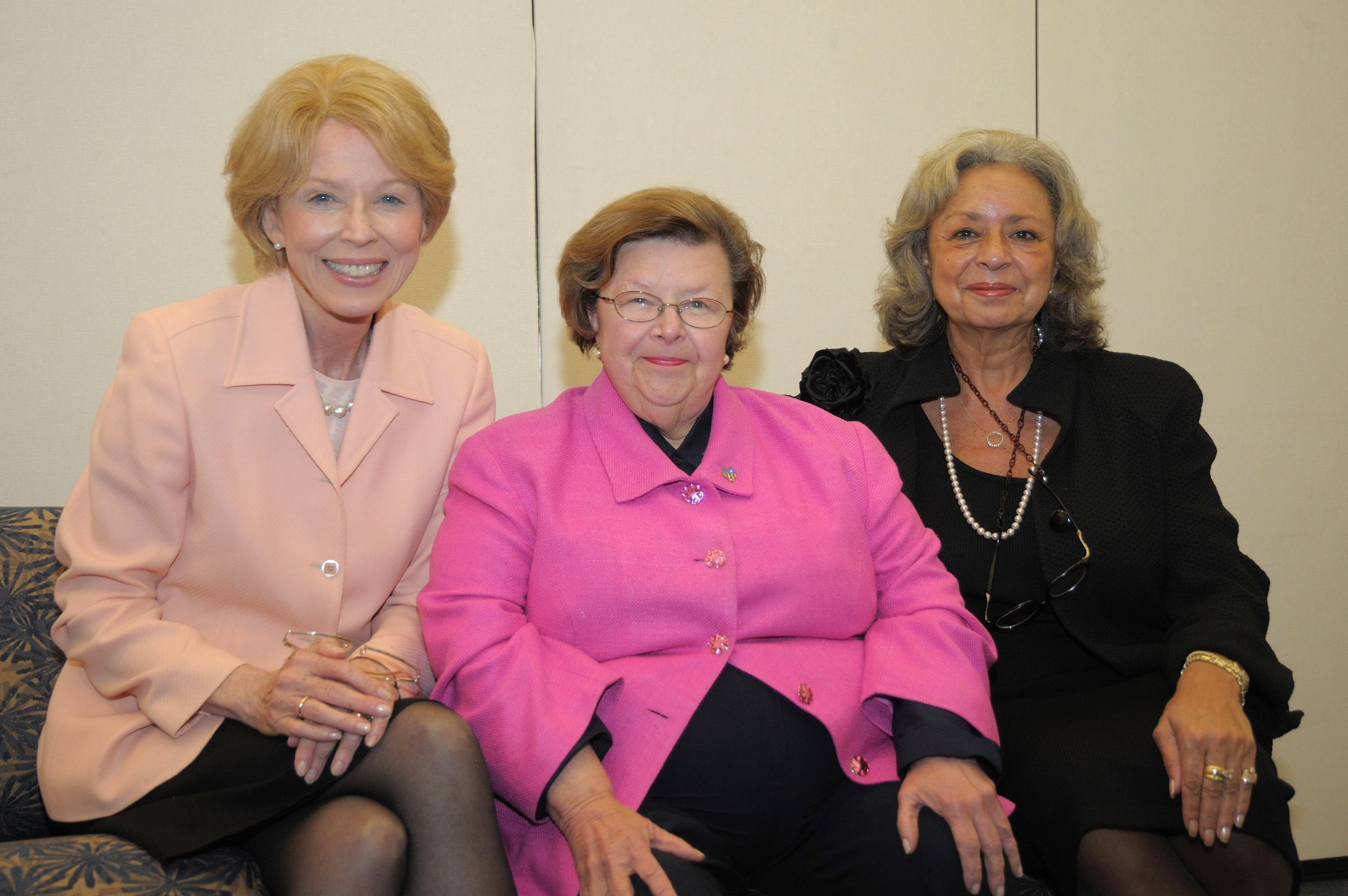
On hand in November 2010 to celebrate the 20th anniversary of the NIH Office of Research on Women's Health were (from l) former NIH director Bernadine Healy, U.S. Senator Barbara Mikulski (D-Maryland) and ORWH director Pinn

In a keynote at the Penn-International Council of Women's Health Issues (ICOWHI) conference in Philadelphia in 2010, Pinn addressed the myriad health issues presented for women and children by global urbanization, as an increasing number of people worldwide move to live in city environments. She said as more people migrate to the world's cities, local governments are often outpaced to provide adequate systems for housing, sanitation, electricity, and water for citizens. Persistent health problems result.

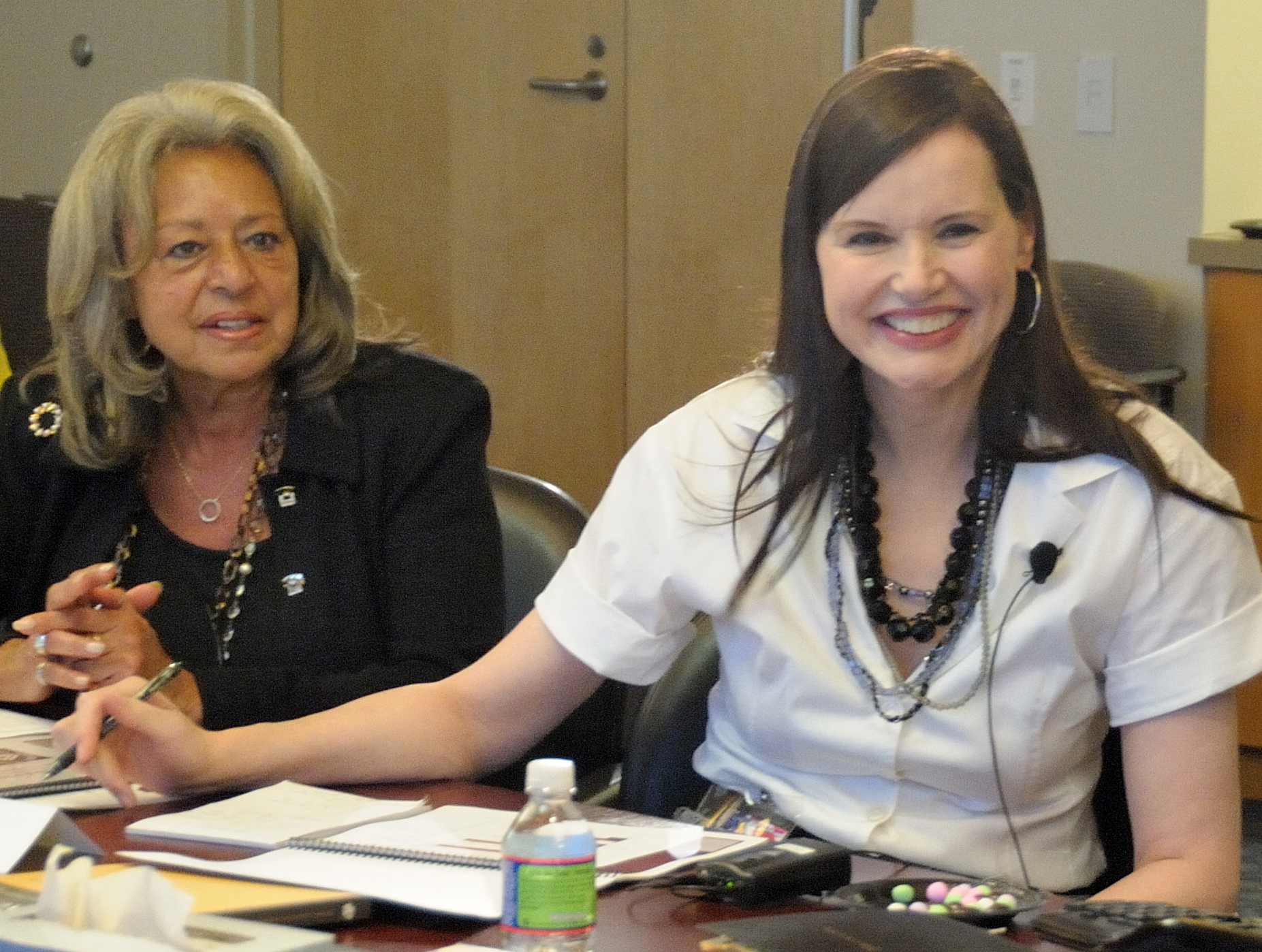
Pinn with actress Geena Davis at a presentation on gender portrayals and health, at the National Institutes of Health in 2011

In 2011, Pinn led a group of NIH staffers in a meeting with actress Geena Davis to discuss how girls and women are perceived based on their roles in children's films, television shows, and video games. During the hour-long session, participants talked about strategies for balancing gender portrayals and how everyone's overall health might be improved as a result.

== Awards and honors ==
Pinn received a Candace Award from the National Coalition of 100 Black Women in 1990.

The Commonwealth Fund named Pinn the recipient of its 2000 Margaret E. Mahoney Award for Outstanding Service, citing Pinn's work to advance the quality of healthcare for women. The award was established in 1994 to honor "an individual whose contributions have fostered the field of health policy and health services and contributed to a better understanding of the complex issues involved."

In 2005, Pinn delivered the keynote address at the University of Virginia's 176th commencement exercises, becoming the first African-American female ever to do so. She recalled "the many challenges to my own sanity and passion for my medical studies during the sociopolitical era of the 1960s." She told the nearly 5,000 graduates, accompanied by some 25,000 family members and guests,

I learned then, and have confirmed as years go by, that we can either dwell in the smallness of slights or difficulties, or rejoice in the larger meanings of life's experiences, and build a positive, constructive, and worldly view of barriers we have faced, and the satisfaction of having overcome them. Don't let difficulties make you small, a complaining spectator of life—but rather let a vision for your own life make you great, a vital participant of life.

In 2011, Tufts University School of Medicine honored Pinn for her commitment to the school and its students by dedicating the Office of Student Affairs in the Sackler Building in her honor and by launching a scholarship fund in her name. Pinn was also awarded the Dean's Medal of Honor, TUSM's highest honor, from Dean Harris Berman. The medal, rarely conferred, is given to people whose service to the school and medical careers have enhanced TUSM's national standing. Pinn served as associate professor of pathology, as well as assistant dean for student affairs, in the 1970s and early 1980s. During her 12-year tenure at Tufts, she was a role model of mentorship. She also played a pivotal part in recruiting students of color and in expanding financial aid.

In 2013, Pinn received the Foremother Award from the National Center for Health Research for her remarkable contributions to the lives of women in our country. In 2021, she was elected a Fellow of the American Association for the Advancement of Science.

== Retirement years ==
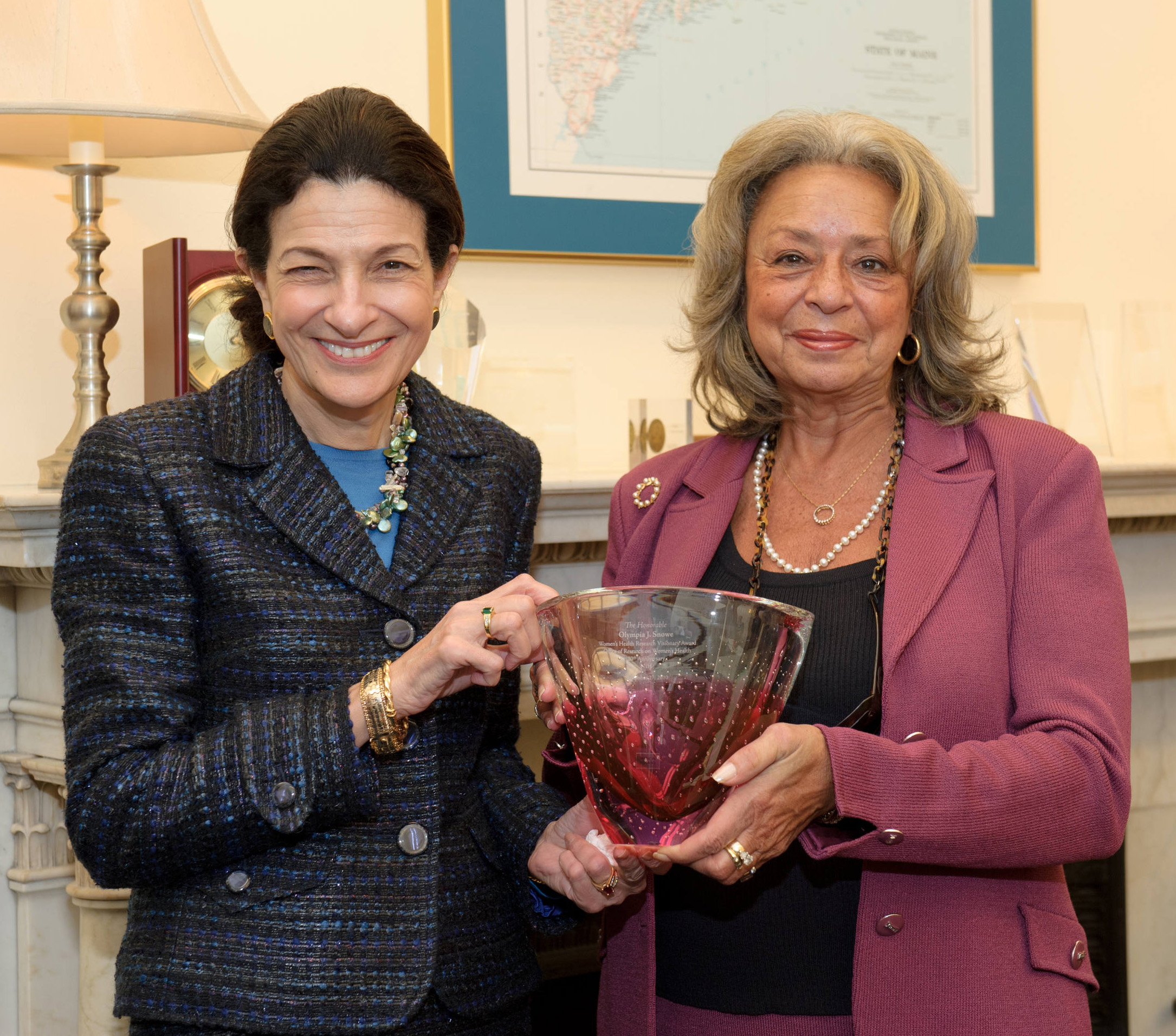
U.S. Senator Olympia Snowe (R-Maine) receives a glass bowl from Pinn at the time of ORWH's 20th anniversary celebration in appreciation for the role Snowe played in starting and supporting the NIH Office of Research on Women's Health (ORWH), July 2005

Since retirement from ORWH in 2011, Pinn has been an outspoken advocate for scientific research in general, and specifically for inclusion of women, women scientists, and underserved minorities in every aspect of biomedical research, as conductors of and participants in the full spectrum of scientific inquiry. Pinn has continued working as a senior scientist emerita at the Fogarty International Center.

She was honored by a statement read into the Congressional Record by Senator Olympia Snowe (R-Maine), upon Pinn's retirement which acknowledged her public service and dedication to women's health and leadership roles in research and academia.
