= University of Pamplona =

- Universidad de Pamplona
- Motto: Formando líderes para la construcción de un nuevo país en paz.
- Motto in English: Forming leaders for the construction of a new country in peace.
- Type: Public, Departmental
- Established: November 23, 1960
- Affiliations: Universia
- Rector: Ivaldo Torres Chavez
- Location: Pamplona, Norte de Santander, Colombia; 7°23′11″N 72°38′57″W
- Website: http://www.unipamplona.edu.co/

The University of Pamplona (Spanish: Universidad de Pamplona), is a public, departmental, coeducational research university based primarily in the city of Pamplona, Norte de Santander, Colombia. The university also has two satellite campuses in the department, in the cities of Cúcuta and Villa del Rosario.

== See also ==
- List of universities in Colombia
- Department of Medicine – University of Pamplona
