= John A. Jane =

American neurosurgeon and Professor of Neurosurgery

Dr. John A. Jane, Sr.
- Born: September 21, 1931; Chicago, Illinois, U.S.
- Died: September 18, 2015 (aged 83)
- Education: University of Chicago, University of Chicago School of Medicine, Royal Victoria Hospital
- Occupations: Neurosurgeon, professor
- Medical career
- Institutions: Professor of Neurosurgery at the University of Virginia
- Sub-specialties: Head injury, spine disorders, pediatrics

John A. Jane, Sr. (September 21, 1931 – September 18, 2015) was an American neurosurgeon, and Professor of Neurosurgery at the University of Virginia. He was Chairman of the Department of Neurosurgery at the University of Virginia from 1969 to 2006.

== Early life and education ==
John Jane was born in 1931 in Chicago. He graduated from the University of Chicago with a B.A. cum laude in 1951, and then attended the University of Chicago School of Medicine, receiving his Doctor of Medicine in 1956. He did his internship at the Royal Victoria Hospital at McGill University and returned to begin his neurosurgical residency at the University of Chicago clinics in 1957.

== Career ==
He studied aneurysms at the National Hospital in London, England, and also taught neurosurgery at Case Western Reserve University. Jane was the program director for the University of Virginia School of Medicine hospital's residency training program in Neurosurgery. In 1969, he became chairman of the department of neurological surgery at U.Va.

He is the former editor-in-chief of the Journal of Neurosurgery, a position he had held from 1992 to 2013. During his tenure as the Journal of Neurosurgery's editor, he also founded the Journal of Neurosurgery: Spine, the Journal of Neurosurgery: Pediatrics, and Neurosurgical Focus, the first peer-reviewed, online neurosurgery journal.

Jane treated actor Christopher Reeve after the horse riding accident that left Reeve a quadriplegic in 1995.

== Awards ==
In 2004, Jane was named a Cushing Medalist, the highest award given by the American Association of Neurological Surgeons.

== Books ==
- Cytology of tumors affecting the nervous system (with David Yashon) (1969)
- Scientific foundations and surgical treatment of craniosynostosis (with John A. Persing and Milton T. Edgerton) (1989)
- Craniofacial surgery : science and surgical technique (2002) ISBN 978-0-7216-8701-8
