= Paul Brandon Barringer =

American academic (1857–1941)

Paul B. Barringer

6th President of Virginia Agricultural and Mechanical College and Polytechnic Institute
- In office September 1, 1907 – July 1, 1913
- Preceded by: John McLaren McBryde
- Succeeded by: Joseph Dupuy Eggleston

Personal details
- Born: February 13, 1857 Concord, North Carolina, U.S.
- Died: January 9, 1941 (aged 83) Charlottesville, Virginia, U.S.
- Education: University of Virginia
- Profession: Physician, educator
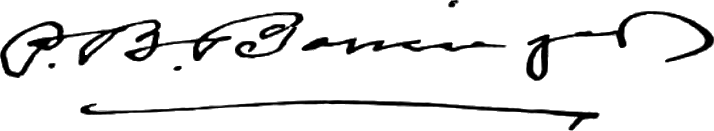
- Signature

Paul Brandon Barringer (February 13, 1857 – January 9, 1941) was an American physician and college administrator, the sixth president of Virginia Tech, serving from September 1, 1907 through July 1, 1913. He was also chairman of the faculty at the University of Virginia (then equivalent to president) from 1895 through 1903. He made major changes to the medical curriculum at U.Va, adding requirements for clinical training, as was common in Europe.

Barringer gained national attention in 1900, when a talk he gave to a southern medical association was printed and distributed to other regional medical groups. It was entitled The American Negro: His Past and Future, and he explored what he described as "the Negro problem" in the South. At the time, prior to the Great Migration, African Americans made up the majority of population in numerous counties, and he advocated a practice of racial eugenics. In this period, southern states were passing laws to disenfranchise African Americans and exclude them from the political system, while passing Jim Crow laws and the one drop rule, which penalized persons of any known African ancestry. During Barringer's tenure as chairman of the faculty, U.Va., perceived by many Southerners as the region's flagship university, became a hotbed of eugenics teaching that continued under its first president Edwin Alderman who took over when the Jeffersonian system of faculty rule ended in 1904. Since its founding in 1819, U.Va traditionally was an academy for Virginia's planter class aristocracy whose interest in family lineage went hand in hand with the science of improving the human stock.

After resigning the VPI presidency, Barringer returned to Charlottesville and practiced medicine. He served the United States government for a few years during World War I by supervising public health in some mining towns. After the war he returned to his farm and medical practice.

== Early life and education ==
Barringer was the son of Confederate General Rufus Clay Barringer and Eugenia (née Morrison) Barringer. He was named after his paternal grandfather, General Paul Barringer (1776-1835), a veteran of the War of 1812. His father was an attorney who became an officer in the Confederate Army during the Civil War. On the maternal side, Barringer was descended from Joseph Graham, one of the Revolutionary heroes of North Carolina. His maternal grandfather, Robert Hall Morrison, was a Presbyterian preacher and the first president of Davidson College.

Barringer was a nephew of Confederate Generals Stonewall Jackson and Daniel Harvey Hill who married his mother's sisters. He spent some of his childhood in Concord, North Carolina, near where his father had grown up. As an eight-year-old, the young Barringer beat Confederate States of America President Jefferson Davis in a game of chess in 1865. Davis had stopped with his family after fleeing Richmond, Virginia following the surrender of Robert E. Lee.

Barringer attended the Bingham School near Asheville, North Carolina, and the Kenmore University School in Amherst Courthouse, Virginia. He received his M.D. degree from the University of Virginia in 1877 and an M.D. from the University of the City of New York in 1878. Barringer later received an LL.D. from Davidson College in 1900 and an LL. D. from the University of South Carolina in 1904.

== Career ==
Barringer practiced medicine in Dallas, North Carolina for three years before going to Europe to study under medical specialists there. From 1881 to 1884 he studied in clinics in London, Paris, and Vienna. On his return from Europe, he settled on a farm near Charlotte, North Carolina. He both practiced medicine and supervised the Piedmont farm. From 1884 to 1889, he also established and headed a medical preparatory school at Davidson College.

In 1889 Barringer accepted a position as chair of Physiology and chair of Surgery at University of Virginia. He served as chairman of the faculty at UVA (a position then equivalent to president) from 1895 to 1903. As chairman of the faculty, Barringer oversaw a major revision of the medical curriculum. Clinical years of education were added to strengthen training, as was common in Europe. He also was the main driving force behind the construction and staffing of the first University of Virginia Hospital. He was succeeded by chairman James Morris Page.

Barringer continued his own research and published a variety of scientific papers dealing with cholera, syphilis, and typhoid fever. He was a recognized authority on venomous reptiles and wrote extensively on the subject. He wrote a series of studies of the American Negro between 1896 and 1901.

Barringer rose to national prominence in 1900 after his presentation to the Tri-State Medical Association in Charleston, South Carolina, titled The American Negro: His Past and Future. Barringer addressed what he repeatedly called the "negro problem" facing the South. He advocated eugenics, a concept that was considered progressive at the time and desirable among some European-American elites. Barringer suggested in his talk that American Negroes had been better off as slaves. The Association voted unanimously to print Barringer's lecture and send copies to all of the medical societies in the South. (This was the period when southern states were disfranchising blacks, imposing Jim Crow laws, and passing one-drop rule that increased discrimination against persons of any African ancestry.)

Barringer had likely learned, long before this time, that as a young man his father had sired two mixed-race sons with an enslaved black woman, Thomas Clay and Warren Clay Coleman (b. 1849), before his parents' marriage and before he was born. His half-brother Warren Clay Coleman was ambitious and had established several businesses in Concord, North Carolina, likely with some financial assistance by his father. By 1900 Coleman is thought to have been the wealthiest man of color in North Carolina, and possibly in the country. He was a founder of the first textile mill to be owned and operated by African Americans.

Barringer was professor of therapeutics and pharmacology at UVA from 1903 to 1907, when he accepted the presidency at Virginia Agricultural and Mechanical College and Polytechnic Institute (V.P.I., now Virginia Tech) at age 50.

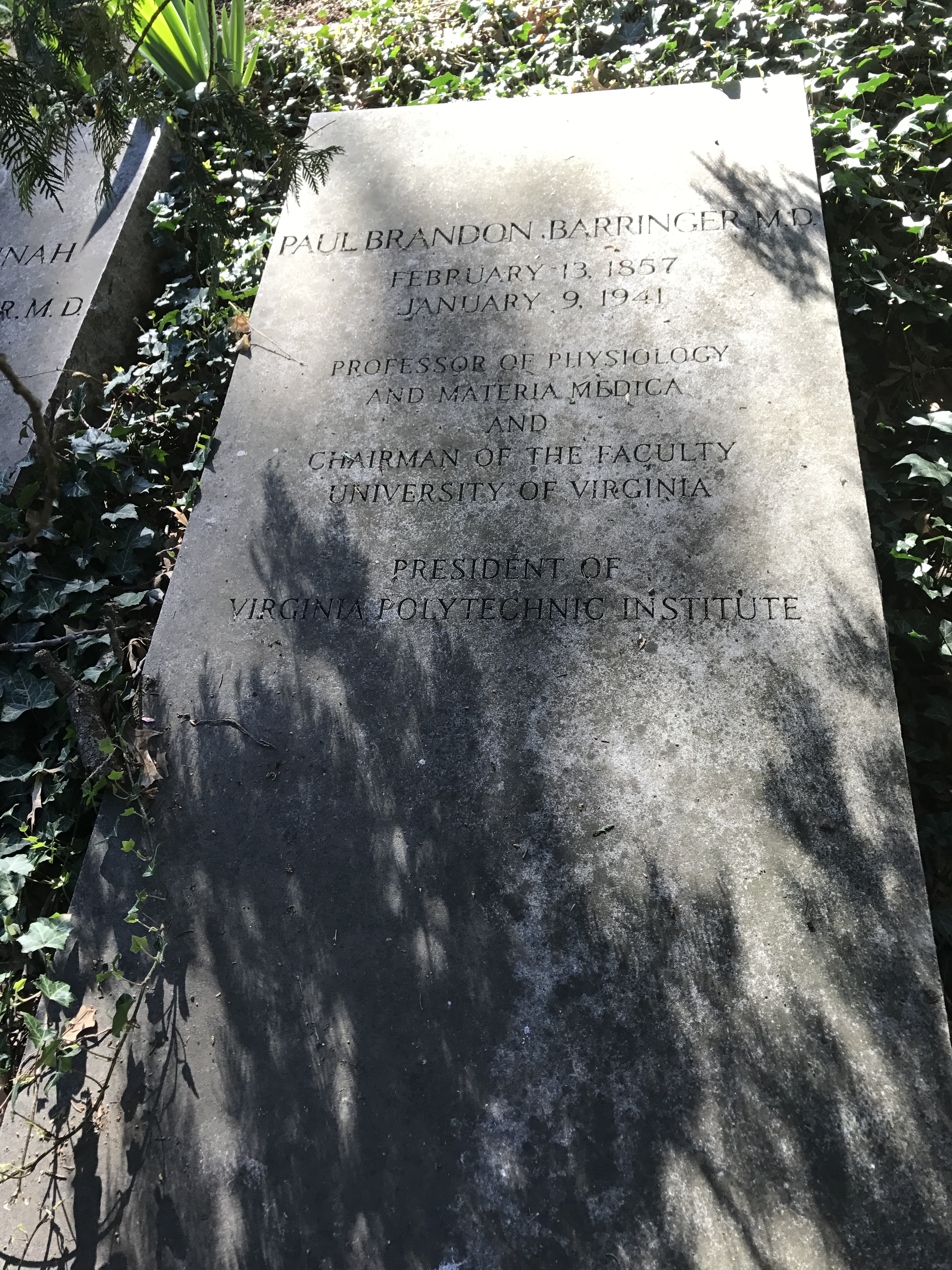
Barringer's gravestone at the University of Virginia Cemetery in Charlottesville, Virginia

During Barringer's administration at V.P.I., entrance requirements were increased; a Farmer's Winter Course was established; summer school was expanded; and Agricultural Hall (now known as Price Hall) was completed. Barringer's tenure as president was marred by disagreements with faculty and alumni as well as the Governor of Virginia over the direction of V.P.I. Barringer, a gentleman farmer, was determined to develop the agricultural facet of the college until it achieved parity with the engineering component, which angered some faculty members and alumni who believed the institution needed to emphasize training for the emerging industrial society.

In 1909, the Chairman of the Alumni Association Welfare Committee, Lawrence Priddy, tried unsuccessfully to have Barringer ousted by the Board of Visitors. The Board ordered an investigation. A public hearing was held 25 March 1910, during which Priddy's charges were dismissed as "unwarranted" and "inaccurate."

However, this was not the end of Barringer's troubles at V.P.I. In the fall of 1911, the Board called for another investigation when a former Commandant of the Corps of Cadets accused Barringer of "countenancing immorality" on campus. An investigation concluded that the charges were "without foundation."

Having survived those troubles, Barringer ran afoul of the Governor, William Hodges Mann, who wanted V.P.I to become involved in agricultural extension work, to be sponsored by the federal government, which was trying to encourage modern agricultural practices. Barringer disagreed, so Mann said he would appoint a Board of Visitors that was opposed to Barringer if the president did not resign. On 10 June 1912, Barringer tendered his resignation; the Board asked him to continue in office for another year until a new president could be selected. A year after Barringer's departure from V.P.I., the Smith–Lever Act of 1914 established a system of cooperative extension services, connected to the land-grant universities authorized by Congress.

After leaving V.P.I., Barringer returned to Charlottesville and practiced medicine. He had a few years of government service during World War I, when he supervised public health measures in American coal mining areas. Efforts to increase production as part of the war effort resulted in related interest in improving public health at those sites.

Barringer died in Charlottesville on January 9, 1941, at age 83. He is buried in the University of Virginia Cemetery.

== Personal life ==
Barringer married Nannie Hannah in 1882, and the couple had 10 children.

== Written works ==
Barringer's history of the University of Virginia: University of Virginia : its history, influence, equipment and characteristics, with biographical sketches and portraits of founders, benefactors, officers and alumni (1904) is considered one of the standard texts on the subject.

== Legacy and honors ==
By the turn of the 21st century eugenic ideas were no longer considered politically correct and were being widely rejected as pseudoscience. This has significantly harmed the reputation of Barringer and other 20th century eugenicists whose ideas were once considered scientific and progressive.

- The Barringer Wing at the UVA Medical Center West Complex of the University of Virginia Health System, a hospital he was instrumental in founding, was named in honor of Dr. Barringer. In 2019, it was renamed the Collins Wing, following an outcry over Barringer's support of eugenics.
- Barringer Hall, a residence hall on the Virginia Tech campus that houses 220 male students was named for Barringer for more than half a century. In 2020 the Virginia Tech Board of Visitors voted to rename the building due to Barringer's early 20th century speeches and writings that expressed white supremacist views.
- His home in Charlottesville, Virginia, the Barringer Mansion, was listed on the National Register of Historic Places in 1982.
