= Department of Medicine – University of Pamplona =

Department of Medicine - University of Pamplona
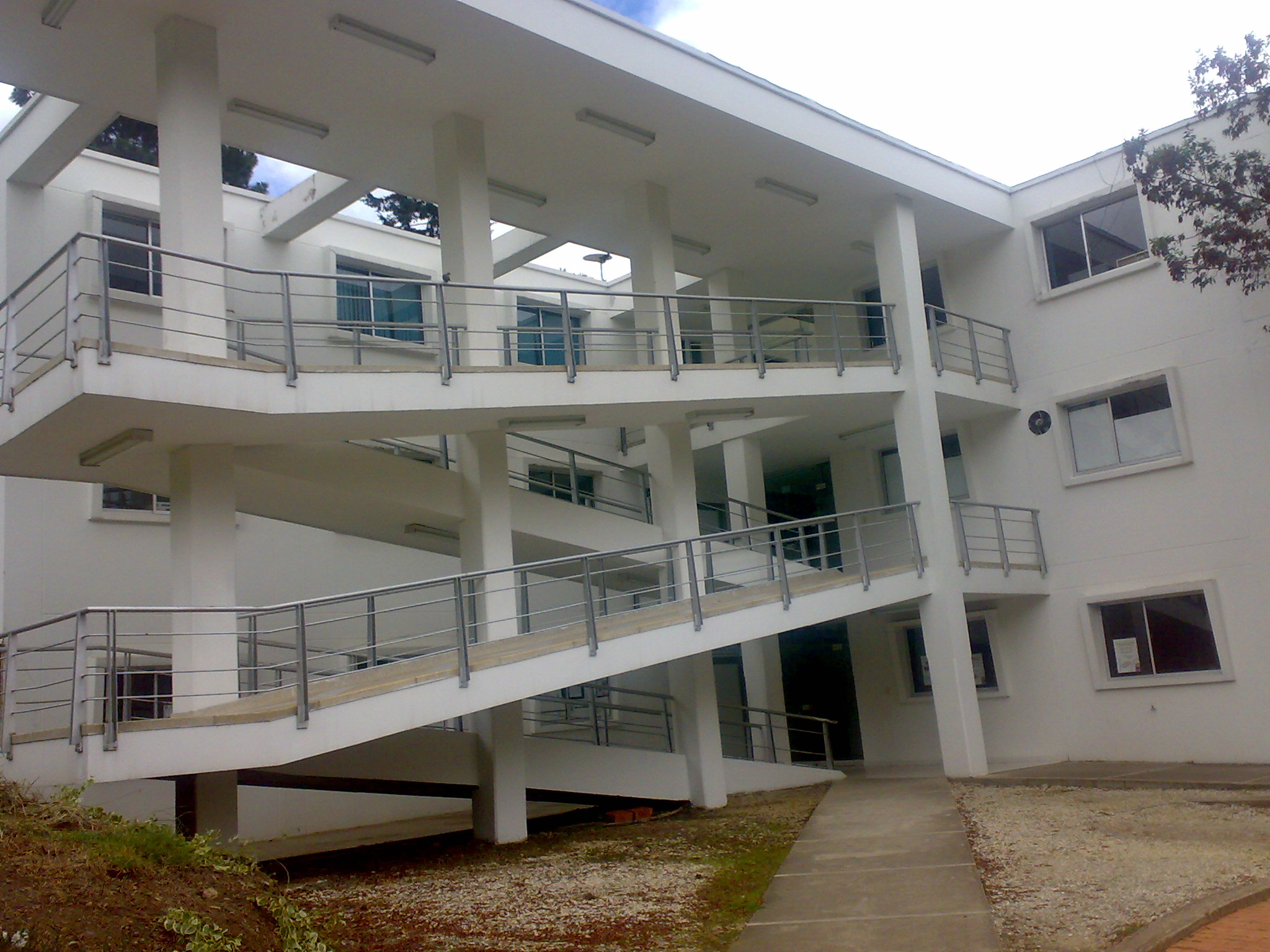
- Type: Public
- Established: December 13, 2005
- Dean: Dr. Mauricio Sarrazola Sanjuan
- Students: 329
- Location: Pamplona, Norte de Santander, Colombia
- Campus: Urban
- Website: http://mdunipamplona.wetpaint.com/

The Department of Medicine of the University of Pamplona is part of the Faculty of Health and (as its name indicates) it is responsible for the academic program of Medicina. This program got the "qualified registration" by the Ministry of Education by 7 years, through the Decree N°5882 (which was issued on December 13, 2005). This department has 329 students.

At present an own tower for this department is being built in the main campus of the university, which would be located behind the cafeteria, on the side of Padre Enrique Rochereaux Building.

Its operation was initially linked to Hospital Erasmo Meoz, however at present uses the Clinic of the Social Security, which were acquired recently by the university. The current director of the department is Dr. Mauritius Sarrazola Sanjuan, who in turn is the dean of the Faculty of Health.

== See also ==
- Pedro León Peñaranda Lozano
- University of Pamplona
