= Henry N. Neufeld =

Israeli cardiologist and scholar

Henry Neufeld
- הנרי נויפלד
- Born: 13 March 1923; Lwówek, Poland
- Died: 1986 (aged 62–63)
- Known for: Founding the Cardiac Clinic at Sheba Hospital, contributions to cardiology
- Awards: Israel Prize (1985)

Academic background
- Education: University of Vienna

Academic work
- Institutions: Sheba Medical Center, Tel Aviv University

Henry Neufeld (Hebrew: הנרי נויפלד; March 1923 – December 1986), was an Israeli cardiologist and scholar. His research and teaching interests included cardiology, epidemiology, genetics and biomedical engineering. He served as chief scientist of the Israel Ministry of Health and was the founder and director of the Cardiac Clinic at Sheba Hospital in Tel Hashomer.

== Biography ==
Neufeld was born in Lwowek, Poland on March 13, 1923. He received an MD degree at the University of Vienna in 1948 and completed his residency there in 1951. He was a cardiologist at the Sheba Medical Center in Tel Aviv from 1951 to 1959. He then spent two years in the United States, with a position of Special Appointee at the Mayo Clinic in Rochester, Minnesota and as an Honorary Fellow at the University of Minnesota. After that, he returned Sheba Hospital to direct the new Heart Institute. He was Chief Scientist of the Israeli Ministry of Health, Professor of Medicine at Tel Aviv University Medical School, and Professor of Cardiology at the Tel Aviv University Medical School.

Neufeld made extraordinarily wide contributions as a member of various heart associations and heart societies. He was President of the Israel Heart Association. He was President of the Asian-Pacific Society of Cardiology, President and President-Elect of the International Society and Federation of Cardiology and also President and Founder of the International Society of Cardiovascular Pharmacotherapy. His services included three terms as Chairman of the Board of Governors of the USA-Israeli Bi-National Science Foundation, and he was an honorary fellow of the Council of Clinical Cardiology of the International Society and Federation of Cardiology. He was on several World Health Organization committees, such as the WHO Task Force against Heart Disease and the WHO Task Force of Cardiovascular Emergencies. Neufeld was also chosen as a life member of the Israeli Academy of Sciences and Humanities in 1984, and in 1985 he received the Israel Prize for Medicine.

He was an honorary fellow of cardiac organizations in Mexico, Portugal, Australia, New Zealand, Germany, and England, as well as an Honorary Fellow of the Council of Clinical Cardiology in the American Heart Association, and he received an Honorary Citation for International Achievement from American Heart Association. He published over 10 books and 22 book chapters, in addition to 400 articles in major cardiology journals.

To honor Neufeld's memory, the BSF established in 1987 the Neufeld Memorial Research Award to be given to the most outstanding and original new project in the health sciences. The grant is awarded annually and given to the investigators whose project is considered as the most outstanding and original.
