= Barringer Mansion =

Historic house in Virginia, United States

- U.S. National Register of Historic Places
- Virginia Landmarks Register
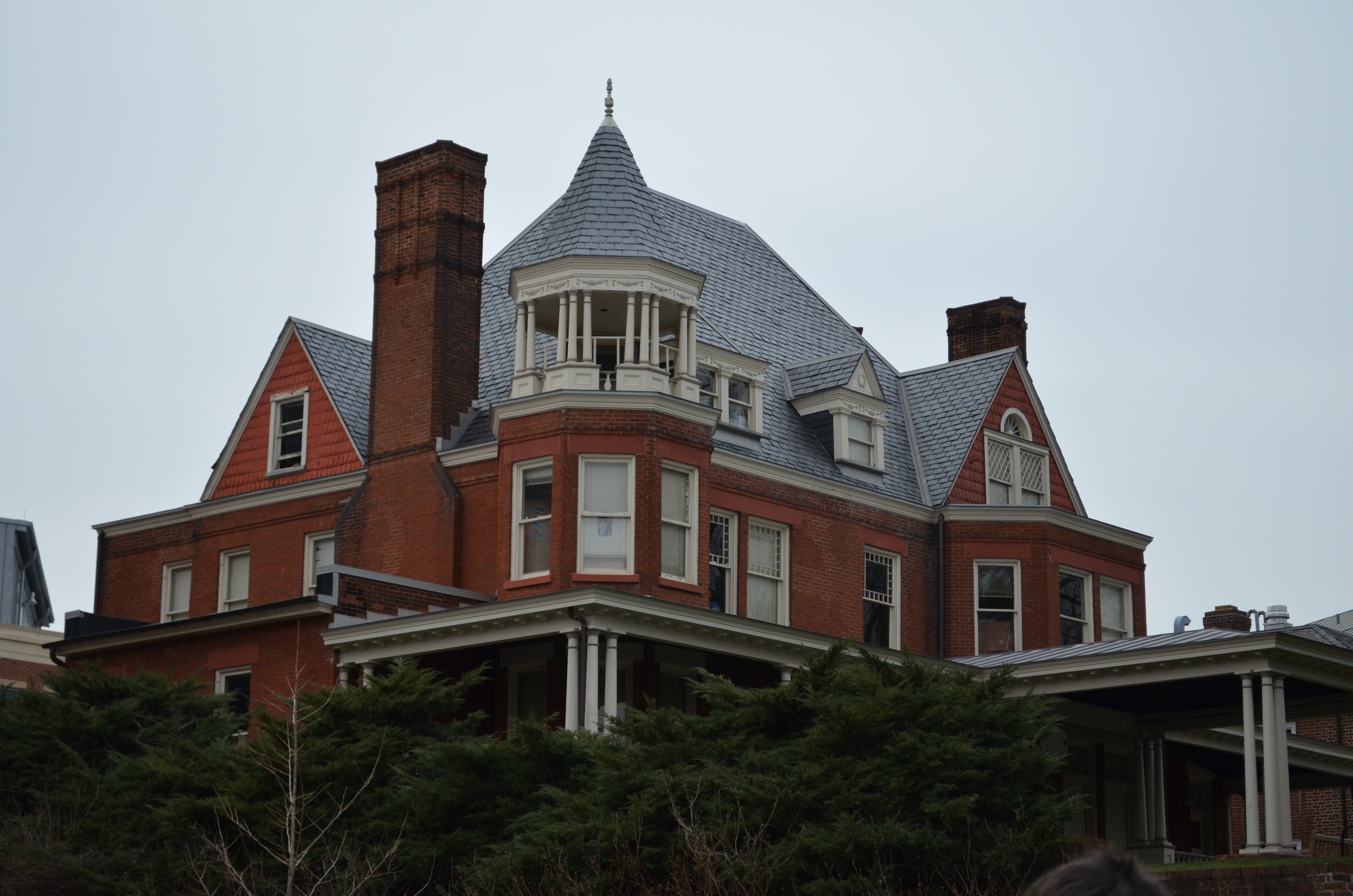

- Location within Virginia Location within the United States
- Location: 1404 Jefferson Park Ave., Charlottesville, Virginia
- Coordinates: 38°1′54″N 78°30′9″W
- Area: less than one acre
- Built: 1894
- Architectural style: Queen Anne
- MPS: Charlottesville MRA
- NRHP reference No.: 82001799
- VLR No.: 104-0022

Significant dates
- Added to NRHP: October 21, 1982
- Designated VLR: October 20, 1981

Barringer Mansion is a historic home located at 1404 Jefferson Park Avenue in Charlottesville, Virginia. It was built in 1894, and is a two-story, Queen Anne style brick dwelling. It features an elaborate turret with garland frieze adorning the cornice, three different styles of windows, and Jacobean chimneys. It was the home of Paul Brandon Barringer (1857-1941), noted physician, scientist, executive, and publisher who became chairman of the faculty at the University of Virginia (then equivalent to president), and later the sixth president of Virginia Tech.

In 1967 a subsequent owner converted the large home into apartments. The University of Virginia Medical School Foundation purchased the property in 1981 with plans to use it as an annex to the university's medical facilities. It was listed on the National Register of Historic Places in 1982.

It is now owned by the University of Virginia and serves as the French Language Residence for students.
