= BIOSCI =

BIOSCI, also known as Bionet, is a set of electronic communication forum used by life scientists around the world. It includes the Bionet Usenet newsgroups and parallel e-mail lists, with public archives since 1992 at www.bio.net. BIOSCI/Bionet provides public, open access biology news and discussion for areas such as molecular biology methods and reagents, bioinformatics software and computational biology, toxicology, and several organism communities including yeast, C.elegans and annelida (worms), the plant arabidopsis, fruitfly, maize (corn), and others.

BIOSCI/Bionet was started as part of the GenBank public biosequence database project by Intelligenetics at Stanford University in the mid-1980s, in collaboration with Martin Bishop and Michael Ashburner in the University of Cambridge. It latter moved to the United Kingdom's MRC Rosalind Franklin Centre for Genomics Research (RFCGR). In 2005, with the closing of RFCGR, BIOSCI/Bionet moved to Indiana University Biology Department's IUBio Archive. As one of the earliest bioinformatics community projects on the Internet, GenBank acquired the bio.net domain and the Usenet hierarchy of Bionet for promoting open access communications among bioscientists, in conjunction with public biology data distribution.

Michael Ashburner, co-founder of BIOSCI with Dave Kristofferson of GenBank (Intelligenetics), writes of its origins

... in the early 1980s, Martin Bishop and I ran an email news service for a sequence analysis service that we ran on the Cambridge IBM3084Q mainframe. I was also a user of MOLGEN at Stanford, and there Dave Kristofferson ran an internal bulletin board using ANU News. We combined forces to start the Bulletin boards.

Bionet has provided open access, Internet news groups and discussion for many thousands of life scientists for 30 years. As of 2019 April, discussion lists are suspended, but are archived for reading. A new supporting organization is sought to continue Bionet into its fourth decade, as Indiana University will no longer support this public service to biologists.

The Usenet hierarchy of Bionet.* includes bionet.announce (general biology announcements), and research communities of bionet.microbiology, bionet.molbio.methds-reagnts, bionet.neuroscience, bionet.genome.arabidopsis, bionet.plants.education, bionet.drosophila, bionet.biology.computational plus 50 other active areas of discussion.
