= American Clinical and Climatological Association =

Medical research organization

The American Clinical and Climatological Association (ACCA) is a society for the study of climatology, balneology, and the diseases of the respiratory and circulatory organs. It is composed of physicians residing in the United States and Canada. It was organized in New York City on September 25, 1883 as the American Climatological Association, and held its first annual meeting in May 1884.

The first president of the ACCA was Alfred Lebbeus Loomis. Loomis missed the first annual meeting due to illness, but at the second in 1885 he delivered a speech in which he explained that the Association had been organized to bring together physicians from around the country to compare their views and experiences regarding different geographic areas that were believed to have the power of curing chronic respiratory diseases, and suggested a broader scope.

In its early years the association's work was focused on climatology and tuberculosis. The ACCA had 133 members in 1901. In 1913 the name was changed to the American Climatological and Clinical Association at the urging of president Charles L. Minor. In 1933, under president Louis Hamman, the name was changed to the current name. The "Climatological" part of the name was preserved in part for sentimental reasons, as the members referred to the ACCA among themselves as "the Climatological".
