= List of Haverford College people =

This List of Haverford College people includes alumni and faculty of Haverford College. As of 2010, Haverford alumni include 5 Nobel Prize laureates, four MacArthur Fellows, 20 Rhodes Scholarship recipients, 10 Marshall Scholarship recipients, nine Henry Luce Fellows, 56 Watson Fellows, two George Mitchell Scholarship, two Churchill Scholars, one Gates Cambridge Scholar, 13 All Americans, and 23 NCAA post-graduate winners.

== Alumni ==
=== Academia ===
- Carl B. Allendoerfer 1934, mathematician and former chair of University of Washington mathematics department
- Anthony Amsterdam 1957, MacArthur Fellow, university professor of law, NYU
- Robert Bates 1964, Eaton Professor of Science of Government, Harvard University
- Terry Belanger 1963, 2005 MacArthur Fellow, university professor and director of Rare Book School, University of Virginia
- Douglas C. Bennett 1968, former provost of Reed College, and former president of Earlham College
- Thomas J. Christensen 1984, interim dean of School of International and Public Affairs, Columbia University
- Tristram Potter Coffin 1943, former professor of English and founder of the Folklore department at the University of Pennsylvania
- Steven Drizin, lawyer and law professor at the Northwestern University Pritzker School of Law
- Stephen G. Emerson 1974, director of the Herbert Irving Comprehensive Cancer Center at New York-Presbyterian Hospital/Columbia University Medical Center and Clyde ’56 & Helen Wu Professor in Immunology, Columbia University College of Physicians and Surgeons and former president, Haverford College (2007–2011)
- David W. Fraser 1968, former president of Swarthmore College, epidemiologist who led team that identified Legionnaires' disease
- Joan Gabel 1988, chancellor of University of Pittsburgh
- Henry H. Goddard 1887, 1889 (M.A.), eugenicist, director of research at Vineland Training School, first in the U.S. to study intellectual disabilities
- Peter Bacon Hales 1972, professor of art history and director of the American Studies Institute at the University of Illinois at Chicago
- Theophilus Herter 1945 (B.A.), 1947 (M.A.), Anglican bishop and professor at Reformed Episcopal Seminary
- Akira Iriye 1957, professor of history at Harvard University, president of American Historical Society
- Fredric Jameson 1954, Marxist cultural and literary critic, William A. Lane Professor of Comparative Literature and Romance Studies at Duke University
- Garry Jenkins 1992, president of Bates College
- Walter Kaegi 1959, scholar of Byzantine history and professor of history at the University of Chicago
- Lauren Kassell, professor of history of science and medicine at the University of Cambridge
- Christoph M. Kimmich 1961, former president of Brooklyn College
- Mark A.R. Kleiman 1972, 1951–2019, professor of public policy at NYU, previously of UCLA, Harvard, criminal justice and drug policy expert, blogger
- Douglas Koshland 1976, professor of molecular and cellular biology at University of California, Berkeley
- Bruce Lincoln 1970, professor at the University of Chicago Divinity School
- Stephen J. Lippard 1962, Arthur Amos Noyes Professor of Chemistry at the Massachusetts Institute of Technology
- George Marsden 1959, Francis A. McAnaney Professor of History at the University of Notre Dame (1992–2008), winner of the Bancroft Prize and Merle Curti Award for Jonathan Edwards: A Life
- Marc Melitz 1989, professor of economics, Harvard College
- Paul B. Moses 1951, 1929–1966, professor of Art and the Humanities, University of Chicago
- George Mosse 1941, University of Wisconsin - Madison John C. Bascom Professor of European History and Weinstein-Bascom Professor of Jewish Studies, concurrently holding the Koebner Professorship of History at Hebrew University; first research historian in residence at the United States Holocaust Memorial Museum
- Ken Nakayama 1962, Edgar Pierce Professor of Psychology, Harvard University
- Adam Zachary Newton 1980, professor of English, Yeshiva University
- Frank J. Popper 1965, professor at the Edward J. Bloustein School of Planning and Public Policy of Rutgers University and the Princeton Environmental Institute at Princeton University; known for proposing the Buffalo Commons and coining the term "locally unwanted land use" (LULU)
- Jack Rakove 1968, William Robertson Coe Professor of History and American Studies at Stanford, winner of the 1997 Pulitzer Prize for History
- Hunter R. Rawlings III 1966 Classics, 10th president of Cornell University 1995–2003 (made interim president again in 2005), former president of University of Iowa
- Fred Rodell 1926, LL.D. 1973; professor, 1933–1973, at Yale Law School; proponent of legal realism
- Charles Coleman Sellers 1925, librarian at Dickinson College and Bancroft Prize-winning biographer and historian
- Edward A. Shanken 1986, University of Amsterdam, author of Art and Electronic Media
- Ed Sikov 1978, film scholar and author of Mr. Strangelove: A Biography of Peter Sellers and On Sunset Boulevard: The Life and Times of Billy Wilder
- Henry Slonimsky, dean of the Jewish Institute of Religion
- Jonathan Z. Smith 1960, historian of religion, University of Chicago
- Eric Tagliacozzo 1989, professor of Southeast Asian history, Cornell University
- Joseph H. Taylor 1963, former dean of faculty, of physics Princeton University, Nobel laureate ‘93 in Physics
- David Thornburgh 1981, executive director, Fels Institute of Government at the University of Pennsylvania (2008–present)
- Sarah Willie-LeBreton 1986, president of Smith College, and former provost of Swarthmore College
- Louis Round Wilson attended 1895–98, academic librarian at the University of North Carolina; founder of the University of North Carolina Press; founder of the library science school at the University of Chicago; president of the American Library Association

=== Arts and architecture ===
- Vincent Desiderio 1977, artist
- Robert E. Hecht 1941, collector, dealer and expert in antiquities
- H. Mather Lippincott Jr. 1943, architect
- Craig Owens 1971, art critic and theorist
- Maxfield Parrish (attended 1888–1891), painter, illustrator
- Walter Ferris Price (BA and MA 1881), architect
- Henry Richardson 1983, artist, designed Connecticut 9/11 memorial

=== Business ===
- Iwao Ayusawa 1917, Japanese labour relations author
- Emily Best 2002, founder of crowdfunding platform Seed&Spark
- Josh Byrnes 1992, senior vice president of baseball operations, Los Angeles Dodgers
- William S. Halstead 1926, inventor in national and international communication; held more than 80 patents in radio and television development
- Samuel Hill 1878, businessman and philanthropist, sponsor of the Peace Arch and Maryhill Museum of Art
- Alex Karp 1989, billionaire co-founder and CEO of Palantir Technologies
- Michael Kim 1985, billionaire co-founder and partner of MBK Partners
- James Kuo 1986, bio-medical entrepreneur; CEO of BioMicro Systems
- Gerald M. Levin 1960, former Time Warner Inc. chief executive officer
- Andrew L. Lewis, Jr. 1953, former chairman and CEO of Union Pacific Corporation
- Eugene Ludwig 1968, chairman and CEO of Promontory Financial Group; former U.S. Comptroller of the Currency
- Howard Lutnick 1983, billionaire chairman and CEO of Cantor Fitzgerald; U.S. secretary of commerce
- Robert MacCrate 1943, Sullivan & Cromwell vice chairman; legal education reformer
- J. Howard Marshall 1926, Texan billionaire oil tycoon; spouse of Anna Nicole Smith
- Tony Petitti 1983, CEO of MLB Network
- Jane Silber 1985, CEO of Canonical, maintainers of the Ubuntu operating system
- Ken Stern 1985, former CEO of NPR
- Arn Tellem 1976, principal, Management Wasserman Media Group
- John C. Whitehead 1943, former co-chairman of Goldman Sachs, deputy U.S. secretary of state in the Reagan administration and later chairman of Lower Manhattan Development Corporation; namesake of Whitehead Campus Center
- Barry Zubrow 1975, former chief risk officer at JP Morgan Chase; former chief administrative officer at Goldman Sachs

=== Entertainment ===
- David Scull Bispham 1876, baritone; Metropolitan Opera and Covent Garden soloist; author of A Quaker Singer's Recollection, 1920
- William Carragan 1958, musicologist noted for his work on Anton Bruckner, and for contributions to physics
- Chevy Chase ex-1966, attended for one semester, comedian and actor
- Andy Gavin, video game programmer, entrepreneur
- Alfred Grossman 1948, writer and novelist
- Mark Hudis 1990, former co-executive producer of True Blood, former writer and co-executive producer of Nurse Jackie, former executive producer of That 1970s Show
- Tobias Iaconis 1993, screenwriter
- Harlan Jacobson 1971, film critic, lecturer and author
- Julius Katchen 1947, concert pianist, recognized by Eugene Ormandy at his debut concert playing Mozart's Piano Concerto in D-Minor (age 10)
- Daniel Dae Kim 1990, film and stage actor; Hawaii Five-0, Lost, The Andromeda Strain; holds an MFA from the Graduate Acting Program at New York University's Tisch School of the Arts; winner of Screen Actors Guild Awards for Lost and Crash; named one of the "Sexiest Men Alive" in 2005 by People magazine
- Ken Ludwig 1972, Tony Award-winning playwright of Lend Me a Tenor and Crazy for You; lawyer (of counsel) for Steptoe & Johnson LLP
- Judd Nelson ex-1982, actor, did not graduate
- Rand Ravich 1984, writer, director, and producer
- Mark Schatz 1978, musician, dancer, and music producer
- George Segal ex-1955, actor, attended
- Sunny Singh 2008, filmographer
- Alena Smith 2002, screenwriter and producer
- Sigmund Spaeth 1905 (D.H.L. (Hon.) 1965), musicologist, composer, radio personality, known as The Tune Detective
- Gregory Whitehead 1978, audio artist, media philosopher, award-winning radio playwright and documentary producer
- David Whiting 1968, journalist and manager of actress Sarah Miles

=== Journalism ===
- John Carroll 1963, former executive vice president and editor of The Los Angeles Times; first Knight Visiting Lecturer at Harvard's Shorenstein Center
- William Henry Chamberlin 1917, long-time Moscow correspondent of the Christian Science Monitor and author
- Martin Evans 1979 Fine Arts, co-winner of 1997 Pulitzer Prize for spot news for Newsday; Pacific Rim correspondent for The Orange County Register, The Baltimore Sun, The Baltimore Afro-American
- Dirck Halstead 1958, photojournalist
- Adi Ignatius 1981, editor-in-chief of Harvard Business Review
- Harlan Jacobson 1971, film critic and former editor-in-chief of Film Comment Magazine
- Annie Karni 2004, White House reporter for Politico
- Joshua Kurlantzick 1998, journalist and author, special correspondent for The New Republic
- Stanley Kurtz 1975, conservative commentator
- Allen Lewis 1940, Philadelphia Inquirer baseball writer, inductee into writers' wing of National Baseball Hall of Fame
- Josh Mankiewicz 1977, correspondent for Dateline NBC
- Felix Morley 1915, journalist and author; editor 1933–1940 of Washington Post; winner of 1936 Pulitzer Prize
- Robert Neuwirth 1981, philosophy, author of Shadow Cities: A Billion Squatters, A New Urban World
- Michael Paulson 1986, theater reporter, religion reporter for New York Times; city editor for Boston Globe, co-winner 2003 Pulitzer Prize for public service, for coverage of sexual abuse scandal in Catholic archdiocese; four-time winner, Wilbur Award for religion writing
- Norman Pearlstine 1964, former editor-in-chief of Time; chief content officer of Bloomberg L.P., senior advisor at the Carlyle Group; former managing editor of The Wall Street Journal; former executive editor of Los Angeles Times
- David Wessel 1975, Wall Street Journal, National Public Radio economics correspondent
- Juan Williams 1976 philosophy, Fox News Channel senior correspondent

=== Law ===
- Richard G. Andrews 1977, judge, U.S. District Court for the District of Delaware
- Gary Born 1978, international arbitrator and partner, Wilmer Cutler Pickering Hale and Dorr LLP
- Robert Braucher 1936, former associate justice, Massachusetts Supreme Judicial Court
- Richard M. Cooper 1964, Rhodes Scholar, former chief counsel for Food and Drug Administration, partner at Williams & Connolly LLP
- Henry S. Drinker, Jr. 1900, 1949 Litt.D. (Hon.), managing partner and namesake of Drinker Biddle & Reath law firm (now Faegre Drinker); counsel to University of Pennsylvania; musicologist; ethics scholar
- Harold Evans 1907, 1968 LL.D. (Hon.), Philadelphia lawyer, active in AFSC, U.N.-appointed first mayor of Jerusalem (1948), argued before Supreme Court in Hirabayashi v. United States (1943)
- Mark Geragos 1979, defense attorney for Winona Ryder and Michael Jackson
- David F. Hamilton ’79, judge, U.S. Court Appeals for the Seventh Circuit
- Lawson Harvey 1877, justice of the Indiana Supreme Court
- Kermit Lipez ‘63, judge, U.S. Court of Appeals for the First Circuit
- Robert MacCrate 1943, Sullivan & Cromwell vice chairman and legal education reformer
- Jeffrey B. Pine 1976, attorney general of Rhode Island 1993–1999
- Stephen H. Sachs 1954, lawyer; former attorney general of Maryland; US attorney for the District of Maryland, where he prosecuted the Catonsville Nine

=== Literature ===
- Lloyd Alexander (attended ca. 1940, did not graduate), Newbery Medal-winning author
- Nicholson Baker 1979, novelist, winner of the National Book Critics Circle Award
- Dave Barry 1969 English, Pulitzer Prize–winning humor columnist
- John Dickson Carr 1929, author of detective stories; also published under the pen names Carter Dickson, Carr Dickson and Roger Fairbairn
- Frank Conroy 1958, author, late director of the Iowa Writers Workshop
- Robert Flynn, 1990, editor in chief of Getty Publications
- Roy Gutman 1966, Pulitzer Prize-winning journalist, author
- Colin Harrison, 1982 author, editor to numerous prominent authors, and editor-in-chief for Scribners
- Evan Jones 1949, poet, playwright, and screenwriter
- Richard Lederer 1959, author known for books on wordplay and the English language
- Andrew Lipstein, author of literary novels
- Stephen W. Meader 1913, author of over forty novels for young readers
- Christopher Morley 1910, novelist, poet, essayist, Rhodes scholar
- Logan Pearsall Smith attended 1881–1884, man of letters, author of Trivia

=== Medicine ===
- Eleanor D. Brown 2000, clinical psychologist
- Andrew E. Budson 1988, neurologist, researcher, associate director of the Boston University Alzheimer's Disease Research Center
- Adam S. Cifu 1989 internist, professor of medicine, The University of Chicago
- Jesse Ehrenfeld 2000, president of the American Medical Association
- Tom Farley 1977, M.D., M.P.H., formerly commissioner of Health, Cities of New York and Philadelphia
- David R. Gastfriend 1976, psychiatrist, addiction treatment researcher, and former CEO of the Treatment Research Institute
- Alan Gerry, chair of orthopedic surgery, Harvard Medical School
- William H. Harris 1949, orthopedic surgery pioneer; namesake of the Harris Hip Score
- Jon Kabat-Zinn 1964, mindfulness meditation teacher
- Raymond Rocco Monto 1982, orthopedic surgeon, researcher, writer; winner of the 2012 Jacques Duparc EFORT research award, president of Nantucket Cottage Hospital
- Kari Nadeau 1988, allergy expert; director of the Nadeau Laboratory at Stanford University School of Medicine
- Ntobeko Ntusi 1998, cardiologist, president and CEO of the South African Medical Research Council
- Joel Selanikio 1986, Sociology, pediatrician, epidemiologist, social entrepreneur, technologist; winner of the 2005 Haverford College award, and 2009 Lemelson-MIT award for sustainability in 2009, for his work in creating technology for global health; named by Forbes magazine in 2009 as one of nine most powerful innovators; former adviser to Tommy Thompson; former secretary of Health and Human Services
- James Tyson 1860, dean of University of Pennsylvania School of Medicine

=== Politics ===
- Bruce H. Andrews 1990, former deputy secretary of commerce in the Obama administration
- Thomas Barlow 1962, former Democratic member of Congress from Kentucky
- Charles Canady 1976, former Republican member of Congress; Florida Supreme Court justice; coined the term "partial-birth abortion"
- Ron Christie 1991, former special assistant to President George W. Bush and deputy assistant to Vice President Dick Cheney
- Peter J. Goldmark 1967, Washington State commissioner of Public Lands
- Oscar Goodman 1961, former mayor of Las Vegas, former criminal defense attorney
- Fritz Kaegi, 1993, Democrat, current Cook County assessor, IL
- Indya Kincannon 1993, mayor of Knoxville, TN
- Mark D. Levine 1991, New York City councilmember
- Andrew Lewis 1953, former CEO Union Pacific, secretary of transportation under President Ronald Reagan
- Eugene Ludwig 1968, former US comptroller of the Currency, partner of Covington & Burling LLP
- Charles Mathias 1944, former Republican congressman and senator from Maryland
- Koichiro Matsuura 1961 Economics, former Japanese ambassador to France, 1999–present, director-general of UNESCO
- Jim Moody 1967, former Democratic member of Congress from Wisconsin
- Philip Noel-Baker, Baron Noel-Baker 1908, Nobel laureate (1959); member of the Parliament of the United Kingdom; chairman of the British Labour Party; architect of the League of Nations; Olympian and captain of Great Britain's Chariots of Fire Olympic track team
- Rob Simmons 1965, former Republican congressman of Connecticut
- Christopher Van Hollen 1947, former U.S. ambassador to Sri Lanka and the Maldives 1972–1976

=== Science ===
- Roger Bacon 1951 Physics, inventor of carbon fiber in 1958
- James Dahlberg 1962, professor emeritus of biomolecular chemistry, University of Wisconsin–Madison
- Stephen J. Lippard 1962, Arthur Amos Noyes Professor of Chemistry, MIT
- Frank Eugene Lutz 1900, leading entomologist in the first half of the 20th century and curator at American Museum of Natural History 1909–1943; developed first nature trail in the United States, the educational trail
- Theodore William Richards class of 1885, Nobel laureate (Chemistry, 1914), first American to win a Nobel in Chemistry
- George Smith 1963, winner of the Nobel Prize in Chemistry in 2018, professor emeritus of Biological Sciences at the University of Missouri
- Joseph Hooton Taylor, Jr. 1963 Physics, Nobel laureate (Physics, 1993), dean of faculty at Princeton University
- Michael J. Weber 1963, director of the University of Virginia Cancer Center and co-discoverer of MAP Kinase
- Philip M. Whitman 1937, mathematician, solved the word problem for free lattices

=== Social action, philanthropy, and community service ===
- Henry J. Cadbury 1903, 1933 Litt.D. (Hon.), Nobel Peace Prize winner and founder of American Friends Service Committee
- Norman Hill 1956, civil rights activist, Black labor leader
- Rufus Jones 1885, 1922 LL.D. (Hon.), author, philosopher and founder of the American Friends Service Committee
- Howard Thurman c. 1930 (special student), theologian and preacher, pacifist and social activist, co-founder of Fellowship of Reconciliation and of the Church for the Fellowship of All Peoples

=== Sports ===
- Josh Byrnes 1992, senior vice president of baseball operations, San Diego Padres; former general manager of the Arizona Diamondbacks
- Thad Levine 1994, general manager of the Minnesota Twins
- Philip Noel-Baker, Baron Noel-Baker 1908, ran for Great Britain in the Olympic games in 1912, 1920 (silver medalist at 1500 meters), and 1924; team captain at the Paris games; the team's exploits were made famous as the Chariots of Fire Olympic track team
- Karl Paranya 1997, first NCAA Division III runner to run a sub-four minute mile and world record holder in the indoor 4x800 relay race
- Tony Petitti 1983, chief operating officer, Major League Baseball and former president and chief executive officer, MLB Network
- Stephen Ridings 2017, professional baseball pitcher for the New York Yankees
- Ronald M. Shapiro 1964, attorney and sports agent, Shapiro Sher Guinot & Sandler; past clients include Hall of Famers Cal Ripken, Jr., Jim Palmer, Brooks Robinson, Kirby Puckett, and Eddie Murray
- Arn Tellem 1976, attorney and sports agent; clients have included Tracy McGrady, Jason Giambi, and Pau Gasol

=== Fictional alumni ===
- Dale Cooper, FBI detective in David Lynch's Twin Peaks
- Astrid Farnsworth, FBI agent in Fringe

== Presidents of Haverford College ==
Principals and presidents of Haverford College
	Name	Start of term	End of term	Notes
Principals
1	Joseph G. Harlan	1857	1857	
-	Samuel James Gummere	1862	1864	
Presidents
2	Samuel James Gummere	1864	1874	
3	Thomas Chase	1875	1886	
4	Isaac Sharpless	1887	1917	
5	William Wistar Comfort	1917	1940	
6	Felix Morley	1940	1945	
acting	Archibald MacIntosh	1945	1946	
7	Gilbert White	1946	1956	
acting	Archibald MacIntosh	1956	1957	
8	Hugh Borton	1957	1967	
9	John R. Coleman	1967	1977	
acting	Stephen R. Cary	1977	1978	
10	Robert B. Stevens	1978	1987	
acting	Harry C. Payne	1987	1988	
11	Tom G. Kessinger	1988	1996	
interim	Robert M. Gavin, Jr.	1996	1997	
12	Thomas R. Tritton	1997	2007	
13	Stephen G. Emerson	2007	2011	
interim	Joanne V. Creighton	2011	2013	
14	Daniel H. Weiss	2013	2015	
15	Kimberly W. Benston	2015	2019	
16	Wendy Raymond	2019	present	

== Notable current and former faculty ==
- Richard J. Bernstein, professor of philosophy (1966–1989); author of John Dewey (1966); dean of Graduate Studies, New School of Social Research
- Lynne Butler, professor of mathematics and statistics
- Curt Cacioppo, professor of music; contemporary composer
- Roberto Castillo-Sandoval, associate professor of Spanish; Chilean author
- John Royston Coleman, president 1967–77; labor economist; author of Blue-Collar Journal; host of CBS program Money Talks", later president of the Edna McConnell Clark Foundation
- Edward Drinker Cope, A.M. (Hon.) 1864, professor of zoology, 1864–67; renowned paleontologist, herpetologist and ichthyologist; long associated with Philadelphia's Academy of Natural Sciences
- William C. Davidon, professor of physics and mathematics (1961–1991); peace and justice activist
- Sorelle Friedler, assistant director for Data and Democracy in the Whitehouse Office of Science and Technology Policy
- Jerry Gollub, physicist, professor of physics
- Elihu Grant, writer, professor of Biblical literature (1917–1938)
- Elaine Tuttle Hansen, provost of Haverford College 1995–2002; president of Bates College in Lewiston, Maine
- Louise Holland (1893–1990), academic, philologist and archaeologist
- Anita Isaacs, Benjamin Collins Professor of Social Sciences; professor of political science
- Emory Richard Johnson, economist
- Rufus Jones, professor of philosophy (1893–1934); Quaker mystic; co-founder of American Friends Service Committee
- Roger Lane, Benjamin R. Collins Research Professor in history; winner of the Bancroft Award from Columbia University and the Best Book Award from the Urban History Association
- Ira De Augustine Reid, professor and chair of sociology and anthropology and first tenured black faculty member (1948–1966), scholar of black urban and immigrant life in the United States
- Michael Sells, guest professor of comparative religions at Haverford (1984–2005); author of Approaching the Qur'an: The Early Revelations; Barrows Professor of Islamic History and Literature at the Divinity School of the University of Chicago
- Ed Sikov 1978, film scholar and author of Mr. Strangelove: A Biography of Peter Sellers and On Sunset Boulevard: The Life and Times of Billy Wilder; for a decade during the 1990s and 2000s he taught "Sex and Gender on Film: Screwballs, Devil Dames, and Closet Cases", then one of the most popular courses on campus
- Douglas V. Steere, professor of philosophy (1928–1964); organized Quaker post-war relief work in Finland, Norway and Poland; invited to participate as an ecumenical observer in the Second Vatican Council
- Ronald F. Thiemann, chairman of Religion (1975–1985), dean of Harvard Divinity School (1986–1998)
- Josiah ("Tink") Thompson, professor of philosophy (1965–1976); biographer and scholar of Søren Kierkegaard; expert on assassination of John F. Kennedy (author of Six Seconds in Dallas (1967) and Last Second in Dallas (2021); left academia to become a private investigator in San Francisco; author of memoir Gumshoe
- Cornel West, assistant professor of philosophy (1987–88), currently professor of religion at Princeton University
- Elisabeth Young-Bruehl, author and psychoanalyst, former student and biographer of Hannah Arendt
