= Kuo (disambiguation) =

Kuo is another romanization of Guo (Chinese: 郭), a very common Chinese-language surname.

Kuo could also refer to:

== People with unrelated surnames ==
=== 括 ===
- Nangong Kuo (Western Zhou) (Chinese: 南宮适), Shang and Western Zhou official
- Nangong Kuo (disciple of Confucius) (Chinese: 南宫括)
- Shen Kuo (Chinese: 沈括), Northern Song polymath and statesman
- Zhao Kuo (Chinese: 趙括), state of Zhao general

=== Other ===
- Alan Kuo (Chinese: 柯有倫), Taiwanese singer and actor
- Alexander Kuo, American professor
- Christine Kuo (Chinese: 苟芸慧), Taiwanese-Canadian actress
- David Kuo (author), American author
- Franklin F. Kuo, American computer scientist
- Frances Kuo, applied mathematician at the University of New South Wales
- Kuo Koul-hwa (born 1968), Taiwanese alpine skier
- Irene Kuo, Chinese-American cook and author
- James Kuo, founder
- Lynn Kuo, statistician at the University of Connecticut
- Michelle Kuo, American curator, writer, and art historian
- Kuo Tai-chih (born 1973), Taiwanese weightlifter
- Tzee-Ke Kuo, Taiwanese physicist
- Winston Patrick Kuo, Chinese-American computational biologist
- Yang Kuo (Chinese: 杨阔; born 1993), Chinese football right-back and midfielder
- Kuo Zhang, Chinese technology executive

== Other uses ==
- Kumukio language (ISO 639:kuo), Trans-New Guinea language of Papua New Guinea
- Kuo language, Mbum language of Cameroon and Chad
- Kuopio Airport, an airport serving Kuopio, Finland
