= Thornburgh =

Thornburgh is a surname. Notable people with the surname include:

- David Thornburgh (born 1958), American chief executive
- Dick Thornburgh (1932–2020), American politician, governor of Pennsylvania (1979–1987) and U.S. Attorney General (1988–1991)
- Elaine Thornburgh, American musician
- George Thornburgh (1847–1923), American politician
- Jacob Montgomery Thornburgh (1837–1890), American politician
- Ron Thornburgh (born 1962), American politician, Secretary of State of Kansas since 1994
- Thomas Tipton Thornburgh (1843–1879), American military officer killed during the Battle of Milk Creek

== See also ==
- Thornburgh v. American College of Obstetricians & Gynecologists, a 1986 United States Supreme Court case
- Thornburgh House, also called Thornburgh, Richmond Hill, Queensland, Australia, a historic house
- Thornburg College, original name of Blackheath and Thornburgh College, Richmond Hill, Queensland
- Thornburg (disambiguation), including a list of people with the surname
