= William S. Halstead =

American inventor

Bill Halstead
- Born: William Storm Halstead
- Education: Haverford College
- Known for: Inventions for radio & television
- Spouse(s): Leslie Munro Halstead, Vice President at Kenyon & Eckhart Advertising Agency
- Children: Dirck Halstead and Anne MacPherson

William Storm Halstead (1903 in Mount Kisco, NY – September 1987 in Los Angeles, CA) was an American inventor who held more than 80 patents involving radio and television development.

As a student at Haverford College Halstead was instrumental in creating the Haverford College Radio Club, and building and launching its AM radio station WABQ in 1923. It was only the second radio station in Pennsylvania, and was described at the time as having “one of the most unusual forms of aerials ever used by a radio broadcasting station.” (See The New York Times reference and original article from December 14, 1934, below.) See also List of Haverford College people.

In 1950, he pioneered stereophonic broadcasting. The process he developed allowed a station to use a sideband of its frequency to broadcast subsidiary programming. This process was called multiplexing, and once fully instituted removed the need for two stations, and thus two receivers at the listener's end in order to achieve a stereophonic effect.

Japan credits Halstead with helping them to develop Nippon Television. He was so honored by Japan that a memorial service for him was held by the Japanese delegation to the UN at the Church Center for the United Nations in New York City in 1987.

He also planned television systems in India, Jordan and Uganda. In addition he was instrumental in the beginnings of Radio y Televisión Martí which was developed during the Reagan administration and went on-air in 1983. Its mission was to fight communism in Cuba and it was based on the Radio Free Europe/Radio Liberty model.

Two more forerunners among his inventions were a portable shortwave radio system for forest rangers and a cable system that allowed motorists at Los Angeles International Airport to get traffic and flight information on their car radios.

In the 1950s, his wife Leslie Munro Halstead, became the first woman to hold the title of Vice President of a national advertising agency when she took over a role at Kenyon & Eckhart. In 1985, through mergers, it became Bozell, Jacobs, Kenyon & Eckhardt. In the 1990s, the firm shortened its name to Bozell Worldwide.

William and Leslie Halstead had two children. Son Dirck Halstead was a photojournalist and the founder, editor and publisher of The Digital Journalist. Daughter Anne MacPherson is a freelance writer.
