= Thornburg =

Thornburg may refer to:

== Places in the United States ==
- Thornburg, Iowa, a city
- Thornburg, Kansas, an unincorporated community
- Thornburg, Pennsylvania, a borough
- Thornburg, Virginia, an unincorporated community

== People ==
- Alan Z. Thornburg (born 1967), American lawyer and jurist
- Elizabeth June Thornburg, birth name of Betty Hutton (1921–2007), American actress, comedian, dancer and singer
- Jason Thornburg, American serial killer
- Jeremy Thornburg (born 1982), American football player
- Lacy Thornburg (born 1929), American lawyer and retired judge
- Lee Thornburg, trumpeter
- Marion Thornburg, birth name of Marion Hutton (1919–1987), American singer and actress, sister of Betty Hutton
- Newton Thornburg (1929-2011), American novelist and screenwriter
- Pamela Thornburg, American politician
- Tyler Thornburg (born 1988), American Major League Baseball pitcher

== Other uses ==
- Thornburg Mortgage, a defunct American real estate investment trust
- Thornburg Placer Mine - see List of mines in Oregon

== See also ==
- Thornburg House, Barboursville, West Virginia, United States, on the National Register of Historic Places
- Thornburg v. Gingles, a 1986 United States Supreme Court case
- Thornburgh
