= Anita Isaacs =

Canadian political scientist

- Born: Montreal, Canada
- Education: McGill University; Oxford University
- Awards: Rowman & Littlefield Award, APSA
- Scientific career
- Fields: Political science
- Workplaces: Ford Foundation; New York University; Haverford College

Anita Isaacs is a Canadian political scientist. She is the Benjamin R. Collins Professor of Social Sciences and professor of political science at Haverford College. She studies democracy, democratization, and democratic transitions, with a focus on peace building in Latin America and particularly in Ecuador and Guatemala.

== Early life and education ==
Isaacs is from Montreal, Canada. She attended McGill University, where she earned a BA in political science in 1980. In 1982 she graduated from Oxford University with an M.Phil. in Latin American studies. In 1985, she earned a D.Phil. in politics at Oxford.

== Career ==
After obtaining her PhD, Isaacs worked as a program officer at the Ford Foundation. In 1988 she became an adjunct assistant professor in the Department of Political Science at New York University, and then moved to the political science department at Haverford College. From 1999 to 2004 she was the Stinnes Professor of Global Studies at Haverford. In 2004, she was a visiting professor at the University of Pennsylvania. In 2006 she was named the Benjamin R. Collins Professor of Social Science at Haverford College, in addition her appointment as a professor in the department of political science.

Isaacs's research focuses primarily on democratization in Latin America, with a particular concentration on Guatemala and Ecuador. In 1993, Isaacs published the book Military Rule and Transition in Ecuador, 1972–1992. Isaacs provides in-depth historical context for the ascent of and successful 1972 coup by Guillermo Rodríguez Lara, and through field research she analyzes his regime, the causes of its downfall, and the following transition to democratic civilian rule. Isaacs's research also concerns Mexico, and Central America more broadly. She has a particular expertise in the politics of migration and refugees.

Isaacs has been interviewed for television networks, including the Public Broadcasting System, about the political, economic, and human rights situations in Guatemala, Honduras, and El Salvador from which thousands of youthful refugees have been fleeing across several nations into the United States. Her interviews in news media include frequent expert quotes in The New York Times, where she was one of the primary subjects of an episode of The Daily in May 2020 and a related story documenting disruptions to college education as a result of the COVID-19 pandemic. Other outlets that have interviewed or cited Isaacs include Time, Vox, and The Christian Science Monitor. Isaacs has also published frequently in news media outlets, including multiple articles in The New York Times, and in The Washington Post.

From 2000 to 2003, Isaacs was Director of the Haverford Center for Peace and Global Citizenship.

During the 2014–2015 school year, Isaacs was Chair of the Political Science Department at Haverford College. From March 2018 to March 2020, Isaacs was a Global Fellow at the Woodrow Wilson Center.

Isaacs is a past winner of the American Political Science Association's Rowman & Littlefield Award in Innovative Teaching.

== See also ==
- Children's immigration crisis
