= Fred Rodell =

Fred Rodell (March 1, 1907 – June 4, 1980) was an American law professor most famous for his critiques of the U.S. legal profession. A professor at Yale Law School for more than forty years, Rodell was described in 1980 as the "bad boy of American legal academia" by Charles Alan Wright.

He was one of the leading proponents of the "legal realism" approach and railed against overly abstract and theoretical legal arguments. He was a harsh critic of the legal profession, which he described as a "high-class racket." In his 1936 Virginia Law Review article "Goodbye to Law Reviews", Rodell famously remarked, "There are two things wrong with almost all legal writing. One is its style. The other is its content. That, I think, about covers the ground."

Rodell himself never became a member of the bar, later explaining that, "By the time I got through law school, I had decided that I never wanted to practice law. I never have."

Rodell studied under Supreme Court Justice William O. Douglas at Yale Law School, graduating in 1931. They carried on a lifelong correspondence, a substantial portion of which is archived at Rodell's undergraduate alma mater, Haverford College (class of 1926). Haverford also awarded him an honorary degree (LL.D.) in 1973, the year he retired from Yale.

== Bibliography ==
=== Books ===
- 55 Men: The Story of the Constitution. Harrisburg, Penn.: Stackpole Books. 1986 [1936]. ISBN 081172171X.
- Democracy and the Third Term: A Handbook for Both Sides. New York City: Howell, Soskin & Company. 1940. ASIN B007Q97ONO. LCCN 40027584. OCLC 768303914.
- Her Infinite Variety, Captured in Color. Garden City, N.Y.: Doubleday. 1966. ASIN B0069RVTBM. OCLC 953132.
- Nine Men: A Political History of the Supreme Court from 1790 to 1955. Littleton, Colo.: F.B. Rothman. 1988 [1955]. ISBN 0837725410.
- Woe Unto You, Lawyers! (2nd ed.). Buffalo, N.Y.: Wm. S. Hein Publishing. 2001 [Edition originally published 1957]. ASIN B001NVA38E. OCLC 50472134.

=== Articles ===
- Rodell, Fred (1970). "Our Unlovable Sex Laws". In Gagnon, John H.; Simon, William (eds.). The Sexual Scene. Chicago: Aldine Publishing Company. pp. 81–90.
- Great Chief Justice: Excerpt from NINE MEN, AM. HERITAGE, Dec. 1955, at 10.
- Impeccable Mr. Acheson, AM. MERCURY, Apr. 1950, at 387.
- Man who Stopped John L. Lewis, AM. MERCURY May 1949, at 517.
- Vandenberg of Michigan, AM. MERCURY, Jan. 1947, at 5.
- Senator Claude Pepper, AM. MERCURY, Oct. 1946, at 389.
- Robert E. Hannegan, AM. MERCURY. Aug. 1946, at 133.
- Bill Douglas: American, AM. MERCURY, Dec. 1945, at 656.
- Sumner Welles: Diplomat deluxe AM. MERCURY. Nov. 1945, at 578.
- Walter Lippmann. AM. MERCURY. Mar. 1945, at 263.
- Justice Hugo Black, AM. MERCURY, Aug. 1944, at 135.
- "A Sprig of Laurel for Hugo Black at 75". American University Law Review. 10 (1): 1–6. 1961.
- Dred Scott―A Century After, ATLANTIC MONTHLY, Oct. 1957, at 60.
- Dred Scott: A Century After, ATLAS, Oct. 1957, at 60.
- Douglas, William O.; Donnelly, Richard C.; Fortas, Abe; Glueck, Sheldon; Hall, Jerome; Lasswell, Harold D.; Mannheim, Hermann; Radzinowicz, Leon; Rodell, Fred; Arens, Richard (1955). "In Memoriam: George H. Dession". Buffalo Law Review. 5 (1): 3–21.
- "For Charles E. Clark: A Brief and Belated but Fond Farewell". Columbia Law Review. 65 (8): 1323–1330. 1965.
- Everybody Reads the Comics, ESQUIRE, Mar. 1945, at 50.
- Douglas Over the Stock Exchange, FORTUNE, Feb. 1938, at 64.
- Black versus Jackson, FORUM. Aug. 1946, at 68.
- Law is the Bunk. FORUM. Sept. 1939, at 109.
- The Warren Court: A Fresh, Free Voice from the High Bench, FRONTIER, Nov. 1957, at 11.
- "For Every Justice, Judicial Deference is a Sometime Thing". Georgetown Law Journal. 50 (4): 700–708. 1962.
- "Judicial Activists, Judicial Self-deniers, Judicial Review, and the First Amendment—Or, How to Hide the Melody of What You Mean Behind the Words of What You Say". Georgetown Law Journal. 47 (3): 483–490. 1959.
- Wendell Willkie: Man of Words, HARPER'S, May 1944, at 305.
- Felix Frankfurter: Conservative, HARPERS, Oct. 1941, 449.
- A Word to the Wise, LIBERTY, Nov. 4, 1944, at 24.
- Trial Lawyer, LIFE, May 26, 1947, at 107.
- Chief Justice, LIFE, June 24. 1946, at 102.
- Divorce Muddle, LIFE, Sept. 3. 1945, at 86.
- Morris Ernst, LIFE, Feb. 21, 1944, at 96.
- Can Nixon's Justices Reverse the Warren Court?, LOOK, Dec. 2, 1969, at 38.
- Pattern of Defiance, LOOK. Apr. 20, 1956, at 24.
- The South vs. the Supreme Court: The Pattern of Our Not So Supreme Court, LOOK, April 3, 1956, at 25.
- Fred Rodell's Limericks―Nine Acourt, MONOCLE, Nov. 1964, at 56.
- In Memorium, NATION, Mar. 2, 1957, at 184.
- I'd Prefer Bill Douglas, NATION. Apr. 26. 1952, at 400.
- "A Super-Supreme Dream Court". New Jersey State Bar Journal. Vol. 2, no. 2. 1959. pp. 181, 199–200.
- Wyman, Louis C.; Rodell, Fred (1957). "The U.S. Supreme Court and Civil Rights". New Jersey State Bar Journal. Vol. 1, no. 1. pp. 11, 25.
- Symposium: Will America Go Fascist?, NEW LEADER, Mar. 25, 1944, at 4.
- Supreme Court Is Standing Pat, NEW REPUBLIC, Dec. 19, 1949, at 11.
- Depression Is Here to Stay, NEW REPUBLIC, Nov. 1, 22, 1939, at 374, 144.
- America, We Love You, in Small Doses, NEW REPUBLIC, Feb. 15, 1939, at 43.
- Arnold: Myth and Trust Buster, NEW REPUBLIC, June 22, 1938, at 177.
- Complexities of Mr. Justice Fortas, N.Y. TIMES MAG., July 28, 1968, at 12; Sept. 8, 1968, at 60.
- It Is the Earl Warren Court, N.Y. TIMES MAG., Mar. 13, 1966, at 30.
- Warren Court Stands Its Ground, N.Y. TIMES MAG., Sept. 27, 1964, at 23.
- TV or No TV in Court?, N.Y. TIMES MAG., Apr. 12, 1964, at 16.
- Crux of the Court Hullabaloo, N.Y. TIMES MAG., May 29, 1960, at 13.
- Fifty Years of the Comics, READER'S DIGEST, Mar. 1945, at 72.
- My Debt to the Town Drunk, READER's DIGEST, Nov. 1941, at 54.
- Gallery of Justices, SATURDAY REV., Nov. 15, 1958, at 9.
- Was Alger Hiss Framed? A Debate, SATURDAY REV., May 31, 1958, at 15.
- Academic Adjudicator, SATURDAY REV., Sept. 1, 1956, at 15.
- Benefactors, Inc., SATURDAY REV., June 2, 1956, at 17.
- American View, SATURDAY REV., Apr. 28, 1956, at 9.
- Portrait, SATURDAY REV., Nov. 5, 1955, at 14.
- Justification of a Justice, SATURDAY REV., July 16, 1955, at 18.
- School Kids Are Color Blind, SATURDAY REV., Oct. 16, 1954, at 9.
- Transatlantic Dissection of a Pen Pal, SATURDAY REV., March 14, 1953.
- Alexander Bickel and the Harvard-Frankfurter School of Judicial Inertia, SCANLON's, May 1970, at 76.
- Background for Peace: Freedom front Attack: International Police, TIME, Sept. 13 1943, at 105.
- Our Unlovable Sex Laws, TRANS-ACTION, May–June 1965, at 36.
- "As Justice Douglas Completes His First Thirty Years on the Court: Herewith a Random Anniversary Sample, Complete With a Casual Commentary of Divers Scraps, Shreds, and Shards Gleaned From a Forty-Year Friendship". UCLA Law Review. 16 (4): 704–715. 1969.
- "Justice Douglas: An Anniversary Fragment for a Friend". University of Chicago Law Review. 26 (1): 2–5. 1958.
- "To A Younger Colleague, the Light of a Gentle Genius". University of Miami Law Review. 18 (1): 3–8. 1963.
- "Legal Realists, Legal Fundamentalists, Lawyer Schools, and Policy Science—or, How Not to Teach Law". Vanderbilt Law Review. 1 (1): 5–7. 1947.
- Rodell, Fred (1962). "Goodbye to Law Reviews—Revisited". Virginia Law Review. 48 (2): 279–290. doi:10.2307/1071179. JSTOR 1071179.
- Rodell, Fred (1936). "Goodbye to Law Reviews". Virginia Law Review. 23 (1): 38–45. doi:10.2307/1067669. JSTOR 1067669.
- The Significance of the Gold Clause Decisions, 44 YALE ALUMNI WEEKLY 483 (1935).
- Commencement Address Delivered at Haverford College, June 8, 1962, 71 YALE L.J vii (1962).
- "A Sprig of Rosemary for Hammy". Yale Law Journal. 68 (3): 401–404. 1959.
- "Obituary Tribute to Randolph Paul". Yale Law Journal. 65 (4): 495. 1956.
- Rodell, Fred (1951). "Justice Holmes and His Hecklers". Yale Law Journal. 60 (4): 620–625. doi:10.2307/793707. JSTOR 793707.
- Rodell, Fred (1935). "A Primer on Interstate Taxation". Yale Law Journal. 44 (7): 1166–1185. doi:10.2307/790936. JSTOR 790936.
- Rodell, Fred (1933). "Regulation of Securities by the Federal Trade Commission". Yale Law Journal. 43 (2): 272–280. doi:10.2307/791350. JSTOR 791350.
- Jerome N. Frank: In Remembrance. 3 YALE L. REP 3 (1957).

=== Book reviews ===
- 41 COLUM. L. REV. 766 (1941), reviewing B. LEVY, OUR CONSTITUTION: TOOL OR TESTAMENT (1941).
- 37 COLUM. L. REV. 508 (1937), reviewing I. BRANT, STORM OVER THE CONSTITUTION (1936).
- 24 FORD. L. REV. 726 (1956), reviewing D. MORGAN, JUSTICE WILLIAM JOHNSON, THE FIRST DISSENTER: THE CAREER AND CONSTITUTIONAL PHILOSOPHY OF A JEFFERSONIAN JUDGE (1954).
- 25 GEO. L.J. 1083 (1937), reviewing H. LYON, THE CONSTITUTION AND THE MEN WHO MADE IT (1936).
- 58 NARY. L. REV. 1102 (1945), reviewing M. ERNST, THE BEST IS YET (1945).
- 31 ILL. L. REV. 696 (1937), reviewing E. CORWIN, COMMERCE POWER VERSUS STATES RIGHTS (1936).
- 25 IND. L.J. 114 (1949), reviewing J. FRANK, COURTS ON TRIAL (1949).
- 45 IOWA L. REV. 684 (1960), reviewing DOUGLAS OF THE SUPREME COURT: A SELECTION OF HIS OPINIONS (1959).
- NEW REPUBLIC, Nov. 1, 1939, at 374, reviewing E. KENNEDY, DIVIDENDS TO PAY (1939).
- NEW REPUBLIC, Feb. 24, 1937, at 85, reviewing M. ERNST, THE ULTIMATE POWER (1937).
- NEW REPUBLIC, Dec. 23, 1936, at 251, reviewing E. BATES, THE STORY OF THE SUPREME COURT (1936); R. ALLEN & D. PEARSON, THE NINE OLD MEN (1937).
- N.Y. TIMES BOOK REV., Nov. 22, 1964, reviewing S. HOOK, LAW AND PHILOSOPHY (1964).
- N.Y. TIMES BOOK REV., Sept. 25 1955, at 20, reviewing J. O'BRIAN, NATIONAL SECURITY AND INDIVIDUAL FREEDOM (1955).
- PROGRESSIVE, Feb. 1949, at 31, reviewing J. FRANK, MR. JUSTICE BLACK (1949).
- PROGRESSIVE, Mar. 1948, at 33, reviewing D. MACDONALD, HENRY WALLACE (1948).
- 12 RUTGERS L. REV. 539 (1958), reviewing A. BLAUSTEIN AND C. FERGUSON, DESEGREGATION AND THE LAW: THE MEANING AND EFFECT OF THE SCHOOL SEGREGATION CASES (1957).
- SATURDAY REV., June 2, 1956, at 17, reviewing D. MACDONALD, THE FORD FOUNDATION: THE MEN AND THE MILLIONS (1956).
- SATURDAY REV., Apr. 28, 1956, at 9, reviewing C. MILLS, THE POWER ELITE (1956).
- SATURDAY REV., Feb. 18, 1956, at 16, reviewing W. DOUGLAS, WE THE JUDGES (1956).
- SATURDAY REV, July 16, 1955, at 18, reviewing R. JACKSON, THE SUPREME COURT IN THE AMERICAN SYSTEM OF GOVERNMENT (1955).
- 35 TEXAS L. REV. 882 (1957), reviewing A. HISS, IN THE COURT OF PUBLIC OPINION (1956).
- 10 U. PITT. L. REV. 605 (1949), reviewing W. DOUGLAS, BEING AN AMERICAN (1948).
- 9 WM. & MARY Q. 271 (1952), reviewing J. MILLER, CRISIS IN FREEDOM: THE ALIEN AND SEDITION ACTS (1951).
- 67 YALE L.J. 1316 (1958), reviewing F. COOK, UNFINISHED STORY OF ALGER HISS (1958).
- 64 YALE L J. 1099 (1955), reviewing W. DOUGLAS, ALMANAC OF LIBERTY (1954).
- 59 YALE L.J. 1013 (1950), reviewing S. KONEFSKY, CONSTITUTIONAL WORLD OF MR. JUSTICE FRANKFURTER: SOME REPRESENTATIVE OPINIONS (1949).
- 57 YALE L .J. 1327 (1948), reviewing REPORTS OF THE SPECIAL TAX STUDY COMMITTEE TO THE COMMITTEE ON WAYS AND MEANS, HOUSE OF REPRESENTATIVES (1947).
- 56 YALE L.J. 1462 (1947), reviewing C. CURTIS, LIONS UNDER THE THRONE (1947); W.MCCUNE, THE NINE YOUNG MEN (1947).
- 54 YALE L.J. 897 (1945), reviewing Z. CHAFEE & J. MACUIRE, A LIST OF BOOKS FOR PROSPECTIVE LAW STUDENTS NOW IN SERVICE, PREPARED BY A COMMITTEE OF FACULTY OF HARVARD LAW SCHOOL (1945).
- 52 YALE L.J. 424 (1943), reviewing R. MAGILL, THE IMPACT OF FEDERAL TAXEs (1943).
- 51 YALE L.J. 704 (1942), reviewing J. PARKER, ATTORNEYS AT LAW (1941).
- 49 YALE L.J. 781 (1940), reviewing M. SHARP & C. GREGORY, SOCIAL CHANGE AND LABOR LAW (1939).
- 48 YALE L.J. 710 (1939), reviewing UNITED STATES DEPARTMENT OF JUSTICE, TAXATION OF GOVERNMENT BONDHOLDERS AND EMPLOYEES. THE IMMUNITY RULE AND THE SIXTEENTH AMENDMENT (1938).
- 45 YALE L.J. 1327 (1936), reviewing C. BEARD, AN ECONOMIC INTERPRETATION OF THE CONSTITUTION (1935).
- 43 YALE L.J. 1202 (1934), reviewing NEW YORK UNIV. SYMPOSIUM, CURRENT PROBLEMS IN PUBLIC FINANCE (1933).
- 41 YALE L.J. 938 (1932), reviewing G. HANKIN & C. HANKIN, PROGRESS OF THE LAW IN THE UNITED STATES SUPREME COURT: 1929-30 (1930).
