= Seed&Spark =

Film-focused crowdfunding platform

- Official logo
- Type: Video on demand Crowdfunding; Film; Television
- Founded: 2012
- Headquarters: Los Angeles, United States
- Website: seedandspark.com

Seed&Spark is a film and television related crowdfunding and SVOD platform launched in 2012.

== Business ==
Seed&Spark is a crowdsourced film and television studio where creators can build audiences through crowdfunding and audiences can watch movies & shows through on-demand streaming. Distribution contracts are non-exclusive to Seed&Spark, with a caveat that a movie or show on the Seed&Spark must not be distributed free elsewhere online.

=== Crowdfunding platform ===
Unlike other crowdfunding platforms like Kickstarter and IndieGoGo, Seed&Spark is purpose-built for film & TV, and its crowdfunding page acts like a registry system, showing potential backers a budget determined by exactly what "WishList" items are needed and at what cost. The platform also allows backers to contribute cash or loan specific items to the project. Seed&Spark takes a 5% fee from successfully funded projects, lower than other crowdfunding platforms, and allows campaign supporters to cover the filmmakers' fees. Seed&Spark currently holds a 75% success rate for its crowdfunding campaigns, nearly twice that of Kickstarter, and an average raise of $14,700 per project.

== History ==
Founder Emily Best created the prototype for Seed&Spark with Caroline Von Kuhn and Liam Brady while raising funds for their feature film Like the Water in 2010. Through the platform, the film was able to raise $23,000 in 30 days. The public site launched on December 1, 2012 with 11 distributed films and 15 crowdfunding campaigns.

Seed&Spark raised more than $300,000 in its first 6 months. Originally based in Brooklyn, New York, Seed&Spark relocated to Los Angeles in 2014.

=== Funding ===
Emily Best was the recipient in 2013 of $10,000 grant for Seed&Spark from SoftBank Capital and Lerer Ventures, given via the New York Observer blog Betabeat's competition series The Pitch. Lerer principal Steve Schlafman explained that Best "proved to us that her product is working and solves a real problem that she experienced first hand." In August 2014, Seed&Spark closed a million dollar seed round led by Wadsworth Family investment fund Manitou Ventures.
