= Herbert Irving =

American philanthropist

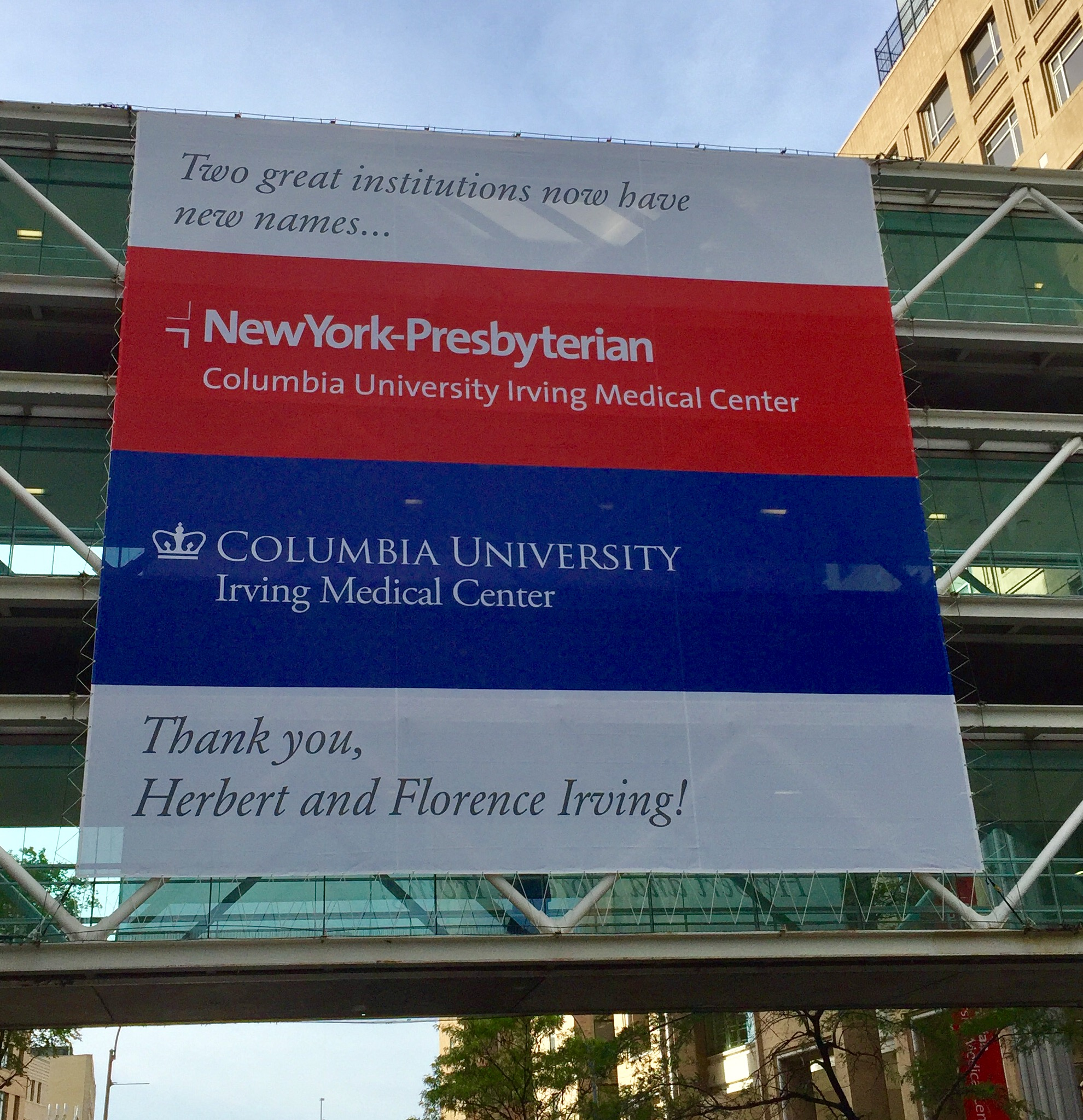
- A skybridge banner celebrating the renaming of New-York Presbyterian Columbia in his honor in 2016.
- Born: November 5, 1917; New York City, U.S.
- Died: October 3, 2016 (aged 98); New York City, U.S.
- Education: University of Pennsylvania (BA, MBA)
- Occupations: Businessman, philanthropist
- Known for: Co-founding Sysco; Namesake of Columbia University Irving Medical Center

Herbert Irving (November 5, 1917 – October 3, 2016) was an American businessman, philanthropist, and art collector. He co-founded Sysco, the world's largest food distributor, and was known for his contributions to the NewYork-Presbyterian Hospital / Columbia University Irving Medical Center.

== Biography ==
Irving was born on November 5, 1917, in Brooklyn. He received his bachelor's and master's degrees from the Wharton School of the University of Pennsylvania. He served with the United States Army in Europe during World War II and took part in the landing of Normandy.

He started his career in the frozen foods business by co-founding Global Frozen Foods with a brother-in-law. He founded Sysco in 1969 with John F. Baugh and Harry Rosenthal and served as the company's vice chairman and chair of the finance committee. He stepped down as vice chairman of Sysco's board in 1992 and remained a director until 1994.

== Philanthropy ==
After being treated by Columbia-Presbyterian doctors, Irving became the single largest benefactors to the NewYork-Presbyterian Hospital / Columbia University Irving Medical Center (CUMC), funding the Herbert Irving Comprehensive Cancer Center in 1995 and endowing the Irving Scholars to support those starting a career in medical research. The contributions Irving made to the medical center totaled $300 million over thirty years, beginning in 1987, when he made the first donation of $8.5 million. A dozen programs, facilities, and professorships at the CUMC are named after Irving.

He and his wife were also known for their collection of Asian art. The couple donated over 1,300 objects and made donations worth over $80 million to the Metropolitan Museum of Art to support the museum's acquisition, exhibition, and publication of Asian art. They are the namesake of The Florence and Herbert Irving Asian Wing on the North side of the museum, which includes the galleries for Chinese art, the arts of Korea, and South and Southeast Asian art.

In 2017, he and his wife made a posthumous $700 million gift to Columbia to advance research and clinical programs for the treatment of cancer.

== Personal life and family ==
He married Florence Rapoport in 1941. He died in Manhattan on October 3, 2016, at age 98.
