= Emily Best =

American film producer

- Born: August 4, 1980 (age 46); San Joaquin, California US
- Education: Haverford College
- Occupations: Film producer, entrepreneur
- Years active: 2010–present
- Known for: Seed&Spark

Emily Best (born August 4, 1980) is a film producer and entrepreneur known as founder and CEO of crowdfunding platform Seed&Spark and producer of the 2010 film Like the Water.

== Early life ==
Best grew up in Sacramento, California. She holds a bachelor of Anthropology and American Studies from Haverford College in Pennsylvania. She also studied music and jazz singing at Taller de Músics in Barcelona. Best's mother was a fiction writer who became a cable company executive, inspiring her to take on leadership positions, and her father is a journalist turned strategy consultant. She has one younger sister and one younger brother.

Early jobs included working on an angora farm in Northern California and restaurant managing.

== Career ==
Best began her career as an actress, joining a New York-based theater group with whom she teamed to feature film Like the Water in 2010, with Best acting as producer.

Needing to raise additional last-minute funds for the film, Best created film-centric crowdfunding and distribution platform Seed&Spark. In 2012, a public version of Seed&Spark was launched with Best as CEO. Best won The New York Observer blog Betabeat's competition series The Pitch in 2013, receiving a $10,000 grant for Seed&Spark from SoftBank Capital and Lerer Ventures. Lerer principal Steve Schlafman explained that Best "proved to us that her product is working and solves a real problem that she experienced first hand." She was named in 2014 one of 78 "Women of Influence" by the New York Business Journal, and cites David Williams, Robyn Ward, Peter Samuelson, Chad Troutwine, and Cody Simms as mentors.

== Seed&Spark ==
Best created the prototype for film-centric crowdfunding and VOD distribution platform Seed&Spark with Caroline Von Kuhn and Liam Brady while raising funds for their feature film Like the Water in 2010. Through their platform, the film was able to raise $23,000 in 30 days.

Unlike other crowdfunding platforms like Kickstarter and IndieGoGo, Seed&Spark acts like a registry system, showing potential backers a budget determined by exactly what items are needed and at what cost. The platform also allows backers to purchase or donate specific items. Seed&Spark takes a 5% fee from successfully funded projects, lower than other crowdfunding platforms.

As a distributor, Seed&Spark offers short films for 99¢, feature films for $2.99, and 80% of profits go to the filmmakers. The public site launched on December 1, 2012 with 11 distributed films and 15 crowdfunding campaigns. The platform raised more than $300,000 in its first 6 months. Originally based in Brooklyn, New York, Seed&Spark relocated to Los Angeles in 2014.
