= Stephen G. Emerson =

Stephen Gould Emerson is an American academic who was the 13th president of Haverford College from July 1, 2007, to August 10, 2011. In February 2012, he was appointed Director of the Herbert Irving Comprehensive Cancer Center at NewYork-Presbyterian Hospital/Columbia University Medical Center, and he will also hold the Clyde ’56 and Helen Wu Professorship in Immunology at the Columbia University Vagelos College of Physicians and Surgeons.

== Education and awards ==
Emerson graduated summa cum laude from Haverford College in 1974 with a double major in Philosophy and Chemistry. He earned an M.S. in Molecular biophysics, a Ph.D. in Cell Biology and Immunology, and M.D from Yale University. Emerson is the recipient of the Medical Scientist Trainee Prize of Yale University, The Stohlman Award of the Leukemia and Lymphoma Society, the Bai-Yu Lan Prize of the City of Shanghai and the Rolex Career Achievement Award.

As a clinical hematologist/oncologist who cares for patients with bone marrow stem cell disorders, Emerson has been regularly named "Top Doc" in his field by Philadelphia Magazine, most recently in 2006.

== Career ==
After graduating from Yale, Emerson served on the faculties of University of Michigan and Harvard University before joining the faculty of the University of Pennsylvania. There, he held the Francis C. Wood Professorship in Medicine, Pathology and Pediatrics, and served as Chief of Hematology/Oncology and as Associate Director for Clinical/Translational Research of the Abramson Center. As the Chief of Hematology/Oncology at the University of Pennsylvania, Emerson led a group of 60 full-time faculty and 25 trainees, for whom he was responsible for career development and selection. At Penn, Emerson was asked to organize the Institute for Stem Cell Biology which would seek to integrate, support and innovate research and education throughout the University, in the school of Arts and Sciences, Engineering, Medicine and Dentistry. Programs of this Institute will include Developmental Biology, Biotechnology and Tissue Engineering, Stem Cells in Health and Disease, Bioethics and Cellular Therapies. He now works at Friend Central School and teaches math.

The laboratory of Emerson does research in bone marrow stem cell biology as applied to the transplantation of these stem cells. The discoveries of this laboratory's science have led to new therapies now used globally. Emerson's work has been published in journals such as Science, the Proceedings of the National Academy of Sciences, and Nature Medicine.

Emerson was chosen to succeed Thomas R. Tritton in early 2007. He resigned in July 2011, four years into his five-year term, and officially stepped down August 10, 2011, the day that Haverford announced his interim replacement for the 2011-2012 academic year, former Mount Holyoke College president Joanne V. Creighton.
