= Eleanor D. Brown =

American academic

- Born
- Occupations: Clinical psychologist and academic

Academic background
- Education: B.A. in Psychology (Education Concentration); Ph.D. in Psychology (Clinical Concentration)
- Alma mater: Haverford College (2000); University of Delaware (2005)

Eleanor D. Brown is a clinical psychologist and an academic. She is a professor of psychology at West Chester University (WCU), where she directs the Early Childhood Cognition and Emotions Lab (ECCEL) and co-directs the Research on Equity via the Arts in Childhood (REACH) Lab.

Brown is most known for her research on children experiencing stress and trauma related to poverty and racism, as well as on arts-based interventions. Her work has emphasized the diversity among families facing adversity and identified ways to leverage family and community strengths to support children's well-being. She has collaborated with community partners, including Settlement Music School, to explore how music and the arts can promote equity.

== Education and early career ==
Brown received her B.A. in Psychology with a Concentration in Education from Haverford College in May 2000. She completed her Ph.D. in Clinical Psychology with a specialization in Child Development and Children Facing Risk at the University of Delaware in August 2005.

Brown began her career in clinical work as a Child and Family Therapist at the Family Support Network at WCU and later as a Cognitive Therapist at the Center for Cognitive Therapy at UPenn. Since 2006, she has worked as an Early Childhood Consultant and Child and Family Therapist at ECCEL.

== Career ==
Brown became a research fellow and later a consultant for Ronald Seifer's Early Childhood Research Center at Brown University Medical School (2004–2010). She has been the director of the ECCEL at WCU since 2005, and the co-director of REACH since 2020.

Brown joined WCU as an assistant professor in 2005, became an associate professor in 2010, and has been a full professor since 2015. From 2006 to 2012, she was the president of the Faculty Senate. She co-founded and facilitated the WCU CARES (Campus Allies Regarding Emotions of Students) program from 2008 to 2012.

Brown was co-president of the Philadelphia Chapter of the Association for Psychology of Women from 2011 to 2021, and served on the Arts and Pre-K Advisory Committee for the Greater Philadelphia Cultural Alliance (2016–2019).

== Research ==
Brown has studied children's development, poverty, racism, marginalized groups, and models of change, focusing on Head Start, arts, mindfulness, and anti-racism training. She partnered with Settlement Music School's Kaleidoscope Arts Enrichment Preschool, leading a series of studies on the impact of the arts, with her research on arts and cortisol in economically disadvantaged children funded by the NEA Art Works Research grants program. In 2010, her findings showed that children in arts classes achieved significantly higher gains in receptive vocabulary compared to peers at a nearby preschool. Subsequent research in 2013 revealed that Kaleidoscope students experienced 60% more positive emotions during arts activities than those in traditional classrooms, along with improved emotional regulation. In 2017, participation in arts classes was linked to reduced cortisol levels in economically disadvantaged children, indicating lower stress. Furthermore, in 2018, her work confirmed that Kaleidoscope students demonstrated greater school readiness than those in a non-arts-integrated Head Start program, underscoring the potential of arts integration to enhance educational opportunities for disadvantaged children.

Brown's investigation found that daily poverty-related stress is associated with negative parent mood, varying with the presence of a stable partner, underscoring the importance of social support in low-income families. Another study linked this stress to parental coping strategies and learned helplessness in young children attending Head Start, highlighting how parental coping can mitigate the negative developmental impacts of poverty. Her research has indicated that elevated cortisol levels during preschool are related to executive functioning difficulties in children facing poverty-related stress, emphasizing the need for targeted interventions. Another study suggested that more playtime and sleep time are linked to lower stress levels for children attending Head Start preschool, suggesting ways parents; may promote their children's well-being.

Her work on the relationship between emotional intelligence and stress regulation in preschoolers demonstrated that improving emotional knowledge could help lower stress hormone levels. She also examined the role of arts education in fostering emotional growth, reducing stress, and enhancing social skills, particularly for children facing economic hardship.

Brown's research has been featured in media outlets such as Pacific Standard, and ScienceDaily.

== Selected articles ==
- Brown, E. D., & Ackerman, B. P. (2011). Contextual risk, maternal negative emotionality, and the negative emotion dysregulation of preschool children from economically disadvantaged families. Early Education & Development, 22(6), 931–944.
- Brown, E. D., & Sax, K. L. (2013). Arts enrichment and emotion expression and regulation for young children at risk. Early Childhood Research Quarterly, 28, 337.
- Brown, E. D., Garnett, M. L., Anderson, K. E., & Laurenceau, J. P. (2017). Can the arts get under the skin? Arts and cortisol for economically disadvantaged children. Child Development, 88(4), 1368–1381.
- Brown, E. D., Anderson, K. E., Garnett, M. L., & Hill, E. M. (2019). Economic instability and household chaos relate to cortisol for children in poverty. Journal of Family Psychology, 33(6), 629.
- Brown, E. D., Weaver, Z., Streich, M., Shivde, G., & Garnett, M. (2023). Cortisol across preschool day relates to teacher ratings of executive functioning for children facing economic hardship. Early Childhood Research Quarterly, 62, 31–40.
