= Frances Kuo =

Taiwanese-born New Zealand mathematician

Frances Y. Kuo is an applied mathematician known for her research on low-discrepancy sequences and quasi-Monte Carlo methods for numerical integration and finite element analysis. Originally from Taiwan, she was educated in New Zealand, and works in Australia as a professor in applied mathematics at the University of New South Wales.

== Education and career ==
Kuo was born in Taipei, and went to high school in Taiwan. She moved to New Zealand in 1994, and became a student at the University of Waikato, completing a bachelor of computing and mathematical sciences with honours in 1998, and a PhD in 2001. Her dissertation, Constructive approaches to quasi-Monte Carlo methods for multiple integration, was supervised by Stephen Joe.

After a year as an assistant lecturer at Waikato, Kuo moved to the University of New South Wales (UNSW) to do postdoctoral research with Ian Sloan. She remained as an ARC QEII Fellow and in 2012 became a senior lecturer at UNSW. She became an ARC Future Fellow in 2013 and a professor in 2019.

== Recognition ==
In 2011, Kuo won the JH Michell Medal of ANZIAM, given annually to outstanding new researchers. The award cited her leadership in "theory and applications of high dimensional integration and approximation, Monte-Carlo methods and information-based complexity" and her interest in "applications in finance, statistics and porous media flow". She was the 2014 winner of the Joseph F. Traub Prize for Achievement in Information-Based Complexity.
