= Dirck Halstead =

American photojournalist (1936–2022)

- Born: Dirck Storm Halstead; December 24, 1936; Huntington, New York, U.S.
- Died: March 25, 2022 (aged 85); Panama City, Panama
- Occupations: Photographer, war photographer, photojournalist, journalist
- Employer(s): United Press International (1957–1973); Time (1972–2001)
- Awards: Robert Capa Gold Medal (1975)

Dirck Storm Halstead (December 24, 1936 – March 25, 2022) was an American photojournalist. He was editor and publisher of The Digital Journalist, an online photojournalism magazine.

== Early life ==
Halstead was born in Huntington, New York, on December 24, 1936. His father, William S. Halstead, was an inventor in radio and television development. He held many patents for his pioneer work in radio and television, including stereophonic FM radio, and developing mountain-top relay systems that were key for building TV networks in Japan and Jordan. His mother, Leslie (Munro) Halstead, worked as a telecommunications engineer. Halstead was given a Kodak Duaflex camera by his parents for Christmas when he was 15 years old, and began photojournalism while in high school. Two years later, he became Life magazine's youngest combat photographer covering the Guatemalan civil war. He studied at Haverford College for one year, before dropping out to work in Dallas. He was subsequently drafted into the US Army and served for two years. Upon his return from military service, Halstead joined UPI and ultimately worked there for more than 15 years. During the Vietnam War, he was UPI's picture bureau chief in Saigon.

== Career ==
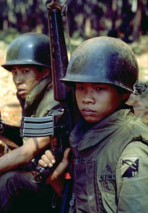
Soldiers of the 18th Division of the Army of the Republic of Vietnam at Xuan Loc in April 1975

Time designated Halstead as their Senior White House Photographer in 1972. He later accepted a contract with them that same year which lasted for the next 29 years. Halstead was one of the six photographers who accompanied Richard Nixon on his historic trip to China in 1972. His photographs have appeared on 49 Time covers, more than any other photographer. During this period he also worked as a "Special Photographer" on films to produce photographs used in advertising materials for the major commercial studios. The films he worked on included Goodfellas, Memphis Belle, Shaft, Black Rain, Dragon, Dune, Conan the Barbarian series, Greystoke, and Cliffhanger.

Halstead won the National Press Photographers Association Picture of the Year award twice, the Robert Capa Gold Medal for his coverage of the fall of Saigon, and two Eisies. In 2002 he received the lifetime achievement award from the White House News Photographers Association, and in 2004 he won the Joseph A. Sprague Award for lifetime achievement and service to photojournalism. The Missouri Honor Medal from the University of Missouri School of Journalism was given to Halstead in 2007 for superior achievement in journalism.

The archive of Halstead's works is located at the Dolph Briscoe Center for American History at The University of Texas at Austin, where he was a senior fellow in photojournalism. His book Moments in Time: Photos and Stories from One of America's Top Photojournalists, was published in 2006.

== Personal life ==
After covering the fall of Saigon, Halstead and his wife Ginny stayed in Kailua-Kona, Hawaii for a week. Despite the "idyllic and peaceful" setting, Halstead was severely depressed, writing in a 2000 retrospective that he would sometimes "walk across the lava at the water's edge, unable to talk about what I had seen." The couple divorced a year later. Halstead's other two marriages both ended in divorce. He resided in Boquete, Chiriquí, Panama, during his later years and died there of a cerebral hemorrhage on March 25, 2022, aged 85.

== Publications ==
- Moments in Time: Photos and Stories from One of America's Top Photojournalists. Halstead, Harry N. Abrams, 2006. ISBN 9780810954410.
