= Herbert Irving Comprehensive Cancer Center =

Coordinates: 40.84090°N 73.94330°W

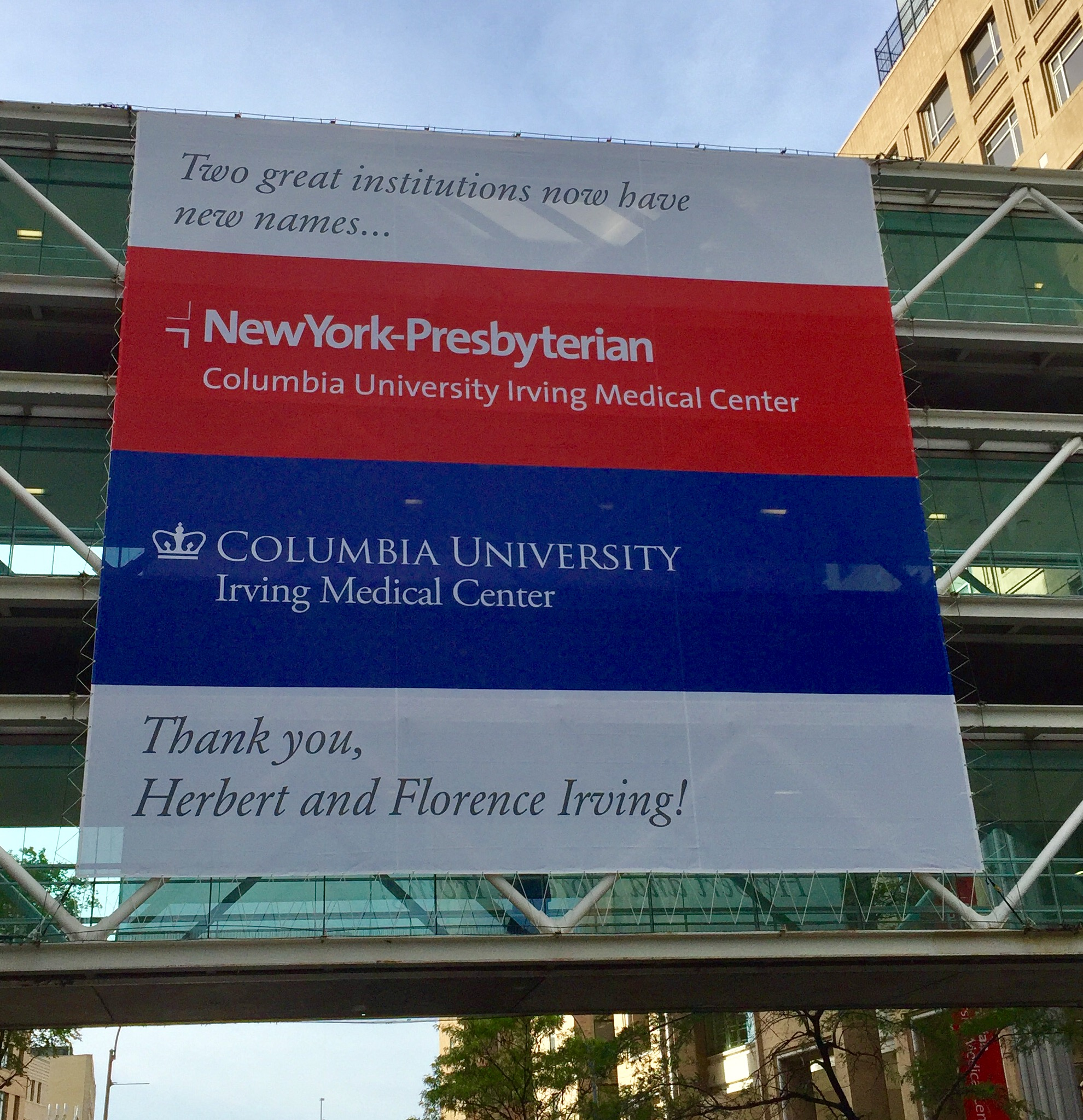
Banner announcing the renaming of the center in 2016.

Herbert Irving Comprehensive Cancer Center (HICCC) is a National Cancer Institute NCI-designated Cancer Center, founded in 1911 and located at NewYork-Presbyterian / Columbia University Irving Medical Center (NYP/CUIMC).

The HICCC has more than 250 faculty members, 12 core facilities, and eight research programs within three divisions.

== Research ==
There are eight research programs at HICCC divided into three divisions. The basic research division includes programs in cancer regulatory networks and cancer genetics and epigenetics. Programs in the disease-specific division focus on breast cancer, hematological cancer, prostate cancer, and neuro-oncology. The population science division includes cancer epidemiology and prevention, control, and disparities.

The center is currently receiving over $33 million in funding from the National Institutes of Health.

== Patient Care ==
Patients are treated at NewYork-Presbyterian Hospital/Columbia. HICCC physicians treat more than 3,500 patients annually. There are over 200 clinical trials available to patients.

== History ==
First opened in 1911 as the Institute for Cancer Research, it soon moved to its current location at Columbia-Presbyterian Medical Center. HICC received its NCI designation in 1972, being promoted to comprehensive status in 1979.

After a 1998 merger, the campus name was changed to Columbia University Medical Center, remaining an academic medical center and becoming the largest campus of NewYork-Presbyterian Hospital.

In 2017, Herbert and Florence Irving gave a transformative $700 million gift to Columbia University and NewYork-Presbyterian to dramatically advance research and clinical programs for the treatment of cancer. In recognition of a lifetime of philanthropy, the Hospital and the University jointly renamed the campus to its current name, Columbia University Irving Medical Center.

HICCC was previously led by Stephen G. Emerson, and the current director is Anil K Rustgi, MD, with Gary Schwartz as the deputy director.

== Notable faculty ==
- Stephen G. Emerson – director of the institute, researches stem cells transplants
- I. Bernard Weinstein – professor of genetics and public health, credited with developing the field of molecular epidemiology
- Siddhartha Mukherjee – professor of medicine, Pulitzer Prize-winning author, researches hematopoietic stem cells
