= Archibald Mackintosh =

Canadian Anglican priest

Archibald Cameron MacKintosh or Mackintosh (June 13, 1876 – May 27, 1961) was an Irish-born Canadian Anglican priest in Ontario.

Mackintosh was born June 13, 1876, in or near Ballyshannon, Ireland, to John MacKintosh and Elizabeth McClay. He was educated at Dorchester Missionary College and ordained in 1901. On June 6 of that year in Toronto, he married as a 25-year old clergyman living on St. Joseph Island, Ontario, with Georgiana Sarah Louise Hughes from England, with whom he had three children. After a curacy on St. Joseph Island, he held incumbencies at Burk's Falls (1902), Port Colborne (1903), Fort Erie (1906), Guelph, Parkdale, and finally Dundas, where he remained rector of the St. James’ Anglican Church until his retirement. During World War I, he was a Chaplain to the Canadian Armed Forces. He was Archdeacon of the counties of Wellington and Halton, and from 1922 until 1950 Archdeacon of Wentworth and Haldimand counties. He died at the age of 84 on May 27, 1961.
