= Tzee-Ke Kuo =

Tzee-Ke Kuo is a Taiwanese physicist.

Kuo earned a Bachelor of Science in physics from National Taiwan University in 1957, and furthered his studies in the field after moving to the United States, by completing a Master of Science at the University of Chicago in 1960 and a PhD at Cornell University in 1963. Kuo worked as a research associate at Brookhaven National Laboratory until 1965, when he joined the Purdue University faculty as an assistant professor. Kuo was promoted to associate professor in 1968, and became a full professor in 1977. Upon retirement, Kuo gained emeritus status.

Kuo was elected a fellow of the American Physical Society in 1976.
