= David R. Gastfriend =

American psychiatrist

David R. Gastfriend is an American psychiatrist, internationally recognized addiction treatment researcher, the former chief executive officer of the Treatment Research Institute (TRI), and current Chief Medical Officer of DynamiCare Health.

In April 2017, the Patient-Centered Outcomes Research Institute awarded a $13-million-dollar, 5-year grant to TRI to study addiction treatment with Gastfriend as principal investigator. It will be the first large-scale trial to integrate the evidence-based practices in the Personalized Addiction Treatment to Health (PATH) model—such as cognitive-behavioral relapse prevention, peer support, contingency management, and FDA-approved medications—and compare them with standard care practices typically offered to patients with opioid use disorders (OUD). With 800 OUD patients, it will be one of the largest ever randomized controlled clinical trials of addiction treatment.

== Professional activities ==
A senior fellow of the American Society of Addiction Medicine (ASAM), Gastfriend led development of the ASAM criteria for placing patients in addiction treatment programs, now standard in more than 30 US states. These criteria became the basis of ASAM's assessment software "Continuum", which will be deployed in the TRI study.

Gastfriend was vice president for Scientific Communications at the pharmaceutical company Alkermes from 2004 to 2013. While there he co-authored a 2011 study instrumental in getting FDA approval of injectable naltrexone (Vivitrol) for the treatment of alcohol and opioid dependence.

In 2012 he received the John P. McGovern Award for "highly meritorious contributions to addiction and society in public policy, treatment, research or prevention" from the ASAM. Gastfriend has worked as a consultant for the governments of Belgium, China, Iceland, Israel, Norway, Russia and the U.S., as well as the alcoholism and opioid-addition treatment company BioCorRx.
