= The Digital Journalist =

US online magazine

- Editor: Dirck Halstead
- Categories: Online magazine
- Frequency: Monthly
- Publisher: Dirck Halstead
- First issue: 1997
- Final issue: 2009
- Country: United States
- Language: English

The Digital Journalist was a monthly online magazine about photojournalism which was launched in 1997 by Dirck Halstead, the editor and publisher. The site provided an online venue for visual storytellers covering a wide range of topics and showcases the work, in photography, videos, and words, of notable photojournalists, print journalists, and young video filmmakers. It also provided updates on current issues and news in the world of photography and commentary involving photojournalism in general and video journalism in particular.

Among the staff and regular contributors were several Pulitzer Prize winners. The site had an average monthly page count of 150-plus, and more than 2.5 million unique visits per issue. It was ranked within the top 100 metric sites worldwide. The Online News Association honored The Digital Journalist twice with its top prize.

The Digital Journalist ended publication in 2009 with Issue 147 January/February 2010.
