= Alfred Grossman =

American writer

Alfred Durant Grossman
- Born: 14 May 1927; New York City, New York
- Died: 1 January 1987 (aged 59); New York City, New York
- Occupation: Writer

Alfred Grossman (1927–1987) was an American writer and novelist.

Grossman was born in New York City in 1927. He served in the U.S. Navy from 1945 to 1946, then attended Haverford College, graduating in 1948 with a Bachelor of Arts degree. He went on to attend Harvard, earning a Master of Arts degree in 1949.

Grossman then returned to New York City, where he lived for the rest of his life. From 1951 to 1961, he edited East Europe magazine, the journal of the National Committee for a Free Europe, an anti-communist Central Intelligence Agency (CIA) front organization.

In 1959, he published his first novel, Acrobat Admits (1959). It was an early example of the wave of Black comedy that swept through American fiction in the early 1960s. In the book, a handsome New Yorker seduces two different women, falls for one, and murders a man. "Mine," he told The New York Times reviewer Anthony Boucher, "is that country where the frontier between the possible and the not possible is unmarked." Boucher found the book unsuccessful but "dazzling and delightful." Most reviewers found it slick and amoral, but Marvin Mudrick, in a Hudson Review roundup of a dozen novels, called it "the most perverse and in many ways the most promising of the dozen."

In 1961, after he married Celestia Martinez y Cardeza, who was a successful travel agent, he quit to become a full-time writer. He was, however, frustrated in his attempts to interest an American publisher in his second novel, Many Slippery Errors. It was finally accepted by U. K. publisher Heinemann and published in 1963. Grossman's protagonist, Charles Kraft works as a demographer for the United Nations but quietly attempts to subvert the aims of his conventional world. He takes of up with gang of Brooklyn hoodlums, has an affair with one of its female members, conspires to blow up a city power plant, and allows his wife to find him in bed with his own sister. "...[W]e must live in a tension between the commands of society and the demands of the individual, not acceding wholly to one or the other," he remarks at one point. Reviewing the book in the Manchester Guardian, Andrew Leslie wrote that Grossman was an "expert at picking up the shorthand messages of the metropolitan scene." In The Times Literary Supplement, David Williams called it "a fable designed to illuminate the unease and vacuity of modern life, with its sell-or-bust compulsions."

The book was then picked up by Doubleday and published in the U. S.. "This new humorous temper," wrote Martin Levin in the New York Times, "is cool, existential, telegraphic in style--and funny. It substitutes deadpan comment for the moral judgment and is as different from the comic spirit of a decade ago as bop was from Dixieland." He criticized Grossman for creating characters that were shells, but considered them "beautifully decorated shells, and the author manipulates them in a masterful game of his own invention."

Marie Beginning (1965) was Grossman's third novel. Grossman's heroine, Marie Betty Svobodna, conducts guerrilla warfare against conventions using nothing more than bravado and bare-faced truth as her weapons. "Her career is a parody of the American dream of success," Anthony Ward wrote. Ward called it "a very good novel" and wrote that Grossman was "inventive in a way few contemporary English writers are." In a The Times Literary Supplement review titled "Poor Girl Bests Fascist Beast," Martin Seymour-Smith wrote, "Mr Grossman's extravagance and apparent zaniness are deceptive: although this is a comic novel, it is securely built on carefully planned and serious foundations."

The Do-Gooders (1968) was Grossman's last novel. In it, he brought back the title character from Marie Beginning, now widowed and wealthy and eager to act as an agent of chaos on a larger scale, inciting riots and blowing holes in 12-lane freeways. In a featured The New York Times review, John Leonard wrote, "His locales are always urban, his characters usually trapped, and his style a pastiche of sex, puns, parodies and razor-wounds that gets funnier as the situation gets more desperate." Leonard quoted Anthony Burgess, who called Grossman "one of the most brilliant of the younger American novelists," whose work was "vital, idiosyncratic, crammed with living characters and real dialogue." Leonard wrote with anticipation, "Grossman has the wit, talent, imagination, intelligence and moral vision to terrify and transform. I'm waiting for more."

Instead, Grossman was soon forced to return to full-time work out of financial need. Around the time that The Do-Gooders was published, Grossman was included in a Chicago Tribune feature, "Ten Neglected American Writers Who Deserve to be Better Known." He told the reporter, Lois Cantor, "I've never made more than piddling sums, not counting a $2,000 advance on movie rights to one book, which fell through. So one just turns one's face to the wall." Soon after, Grossman went to work as a staff editor of The New York Times Encyclopedic Almanac. He divorced his first wife and married Althea Van Boskirk, who also worked on the almanac, in 1972.

Grossman never published another book. A 1981 The New York Times article titled, "Life's Ironies Taunt a Manhattan Novelist," revealed that Grossman had been diagnosed with multiple sclerosis in 1976 and was living alone, using a wheelchair, dependent upon Medicaid and Social Security. Although he had lost the ability to type, he was still writing, composing in his head, then taping his mental draft. He said he had finished on a novel taken from a line in the Book of Job, about a New Yorker who communicates with an alien spacecraft, but had been unable to find a publisher for it. When Strand Bookstore employee Burt Britton solicited a self portrait sketch in 1975, Grossman provided an awkward circle with the caption, "E = MC2" and a scrawled signature.

He died in 1987.

== Works ==
Novels

- Acrobat Admits (1959)
- Many Slippery Errors (1963 U. K./1964 U. S.)
- Marie Beginning (1965)
- The Do-Gooders (1968)
