= Barry Zubrow =

American business executive and investment banker

- Born: Barry L. Zubrow; February 19, 1953 (age 73)
- Education: University of Chicago (MBA and JD); Haverford College (BA)
- Occupation: Investment banker
- Known for: Chief Risk Officer of JPMorgan Chase
- Spouse: Jan Rock Zubrow

Barry L. Zubrow (born February 19, 1953) is an American business executive and investment banker. Spending most of his career at Goldman Sachs, including in key leadership roles, he subsequently served as the Chief Risk Officer of JPMorgan Chase during the 2008 financial crisis. He was later appointed the Head of Corporate and Regulatory Affairs at that company between January and November 2012.

== Early life and education ==
Born to a Jewish family, Zubrow earned a B.A. from Haverford College and both his J.D. and M.B.A from the University of Chicago.

== Career ==
Zubrow started his career in investment banking with Goldman Sachs in 1979 and becoming a partner in 1988. Between 1997 and 2003 he was Chief Administrative Officer and Head of the Operations and Administration division. He also was elected as the Chief Credit Officer.

Zubrow was Chief Risk Officer of JPMorgan Chase & Co until January 13, 2012, including during the 2008 financial meltdown when the company lost $2 billion and later when the company's investment practices were under Federal investigation after a multi-billion dollar trading loss. Later that year he was appointed as the company's head of corporate regulatory affairs.

In November, 2012, Zubrow left JP Morgan.

Zubrow is CEO and President of ITB LLC, a private investment firm, and served as a Director of Nuvelo Inc. since February 2, 2004 and its Lead Independent Director since September 2005. He was a Director of GSC Capital Corp, and served as the Vice Chairman of Nuvelo. He serves on the Board of Directors of CIBC, a major Canadian investment bank, as well as of Promontory Financial Group, a financial services-related consulting firm. He also sits on the board of Arc Logistics Partners LP, a public midstream oil and gas company.

Zubrow is a member of the Council on Foreign Relations as well the Committee on Capital Markets Regulation.

== Personal life ==
In 1986, he married Jan Rock in a Jewish ceremony in Cedarhurst, New York. He has two sons, Matthew Rock Zubrow and Spencer Evan Zubrow (married to Emily Evans Zubrow 2026).
