= William H. Harris (orthopaedic surgeon) =

American orthopaedic surgeon

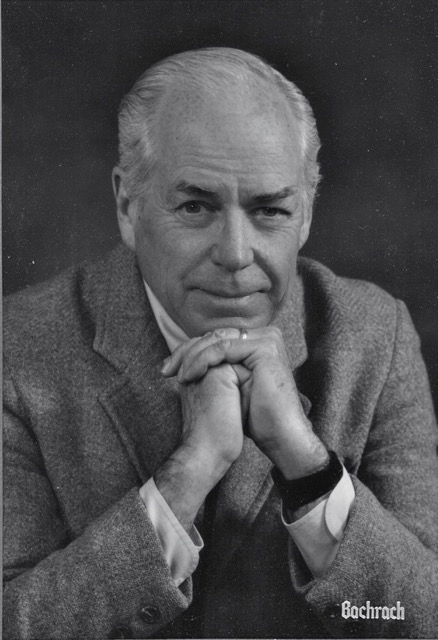
- Born: November 18, 1927 (age 98); Great Falls, Montana
- Education: Haverford College (BS); University of Pennsylvania (MD)
- Spouse: Johanna A. (Nan) Harris
- Medical career
- Profession: orthopaedic surgeon
- Institutions: Massachusetts General Hospital
- Sub-specialties: total hip replacement
- Website: williamhharris.technoir.net

William H. Harris, is an American orthopaedic surgeon, Founder and Director Emeritus of the Massachusetts General Hospital Harris Orthopaedics Laboratory, and creator of the Advances in Arthroplasty course held annually since 1970.

Much of Harris' research focuses on osteolysis, the deterioration of bone tissue around joint replacement implants, and developing highly cross-linked polyethylene to counter the issue of osteolysis. Fifteen years of wide spread use of highly cross-linked polyethylene in patients have shown it to be very effective in preventing osteolysis. Harris is also recognized for performing the world's first successful total hip replacement in a patient with a total congenital dislocation of the hip and for developing the first effective cement-free acetabular component.

In addition, Harris is known for developing the Harris Hip Score which rates a patient's progress on pain and function following surgery. His work inspired surgical techniques, implant design, development of new operations, prevention of blood clot formation, and other leading advances in hip surgery.

== Early life and education ==
Harris was born in 1927 in Great Falls, Montana and raised in Harrisburg, Pennsylvania. He received his B.S. from Haverford College in 1947 with High Honors and his M.D. from Perelman School of Medicine at the University of Pennsylvania in 1951. Harris interned at the Hospital of the University of Pennsylvania and completed a one-year general surgery residency there.

== Career ==
He completed orthopedic training at the Boston Children's Hospital and Massachusetts General Hospital.

Harris performed one of the first femoral head autograft procedures and one of the first femoral head allograft procedures: two techniques that are now widely used. Along with his research staff at Massachusetts General Hospital, Harris was the first to centrifuge cement. The Total System, introduced in 1983, was designed by Harris and was the first integrated system offering an entire range of cemented and cementless implants.

Harris was one of the two designers to create the first successful cementless acetabular component. This was the first time screws were put through the acetabular component to fix it to the skeleton. He is also the designer of one of the most successful long-term cemented femoral components.

Harris was Chief of the Adult Reconstructive Surgery and Director of the Harris Orthopedic Laboratory of the Massachusetts General Hospital. He has been Clinical Professor of Orthopedic Surgery at the Harvard Medical School since 1974 and was awarded the Alan Gerry Chair as Clinical Professor of Orthopedic Surgery at Harvard Medical School in 1997.

Harris is a founding member of The Hip Society of North America and served as the organization's first president. He went on to be a founding member and president of the International Hip Society. The Hip Society granted Dr. Harris a record thirteen honorary awards for outstanding contributions to hip surgery, and he has three times won the Kappa Delta Award of the American Academy of Orthopedic Surgeons for outstanding orthopedic research. Dr. Harris is the author of some 526 scientific publications and three textbooks dealing with hip surgery, arthritis and diseases of the skeleton.

== Honors and awards ==
- three Kappa Delta Awards
- 113 awards from the Hip Society
- The Lifetime Achievement Award from the Hip Society
- Lifetime Achievement Award from the Muller Foundation
- Lifetime Achievement Award of the International Hip Society

== Publications ==
Partial list:

- Harris, W. H. (2014). "Response to Dr. Mont". The Journal of Arthroplasty. 29 (3): 649. doi:10.1016/j.arth.2013.10.013. PMID 24370488.
- Harris, W. H. (2014). "Last decade in THA: Unsettling and disappointing". The Journal of Arthroplasty. 29 (3): 648. doi:10.1016/j.arth.2013.10.011. PMID 24295801.
- Harris, W. H. (2013). "Editor's Spotlight/Take 5: CT pulmonary angiography after total joint arthroplasty: Overdiagnosis and iatrogenic harm?". Clinical Orthopaedics and Related Research. 471 (12): 4089–90. doi:10.1007/s11999-013-3301-3. PMC 3825886. PMID 24072628.
- Harris, W. H. (2012). "Edge loading has a paradoxical effect on wear in metal-on-polyethylene total hip arthroplasties". Clinical Orthopaedics and Related Research. 470 (11): 3077–82. doi:10.1007/s11999-012-2330-7. PMC 3462843. PMID 22644421.
- Harris, W. H. (2009). "The correlation between minor or unrecognized developmental deformities and the development of osteoarthritis of the hip". Instructional Course Lectures. 58: 257–9. PMID 19385539.
- Harris, W. H. (2009). "The first 50 years of total hip arthroplasty: Lessons learned". Clinical Orthopaedics and Related Research. 467 (1): 28–31. doi:10.1007/s11999-008-0467-1. PMC 2601012. PMID 18982399.
- Ganz, R; Leunig, M; Leunig-Ganz, K; Harris, W. H. (2008). "The etiology of osteoarthritis of the hip: An integrated mechanical concept". Clinical Orthopaedics and Related Research. 466 (2): 264–72. doi:10.1007/s11999-007-0060-z. PMC 2505145. PMID 18196405.
- Bragdon, C. R.; Kwon, Y. M.; Geller, J. A.; Greene, M. E.; Freiberg, A. A.; Harris, W. H.; Malchau, H (2007). "Minimum 6-year followup of highly cross-linked polyethylene in THA". Clinical Orthopaedics and Related Research. 465: 122–7. doi:10.1097/BLO.0b013e31815760b1. PMID 18090469. S2CID 22859594.
- Bragdon, C. R.; Greene, M. E.; Freiberg, A. A.; Harris, W. H.; Malchau, H (2007). "Radiostereometric analysis comparison of wear of highly cross-linked polyethylene against 36- vs 28-mm femoral heads". The Journal of Arthroplasty. 22 (6 Suppl 2): 125–9. doi:10.1016/j.arth.2007.03.009. PMID 17823030.
- Estok Dm, 2nd; Burroughs, B. R.; Muratoglu, O. K.; Harris, W. H. (2007). "Comparison of hip simulator wear of 2 different highly cross-linked ultra high molecular weight polyethylene acetabular components using both 32- and 38-mm femoral heads". The Journal of Arthroplasty. 22 (4): 581–9. doi:10.1016/j.arth.2006.07.009. PMID 17562417.
- Muratoglu, O. K.; Rubash, H. E.; Bragdon, C. R.; Burroughs, B. R.; Huang, A; Harris, W. H. (2007). "Simulated normal gait wear testing of a highly cross-linked polyethylene tibial insert". The Journal of Arthroplasty. 22 (3): 435–44. doi:10.1016/j.arth.2006.07.014. PMID 17400100.
- Burroughs, B. R.; Muratoglu, O. K.; Bragdon, C. R.; Wannomae, K. K.; Christensen, S; Lozynsky, A. J.; Harris, W. H. (2006). "In vitro comparison of frictional torque and torsional resistance of aged conventional gamma-in-nitrogen sterilized polyethylene versus aged highly crosslinked polyethylene articulating against head sizes larger than 32 mm". Acta Orthopaedica. 77 (5): 710–8. doi:10.1080/17453670610012881. PMID 17068700. S2CID 32880033.
- Harris, W. H. (2006). "An integrated solution to acetabular revision surgery". Clinical Orthopaedics and Related Research. 453: 178–82. doi:10.1097/01.blo.0000246546.80068.04. PMID 17031311.
- Duffy, G. P.; Lozynsky, A. J.; Harris, W. H. (2006). "Polished vs rough femoral components in grade a and grade C-2 cement mantles". The Journal of Arthroplasty. 21 (7): 1054–63. doi:10.1016/j.arth.2005.07.018. PMID 17027551.
- Wannomae, K. K.; Bhattacharyya, S; Freiberg, A; Estok, D; Harris, W. H.; Muratoglu, O (2006). "In vivo oxidation of retrieved cross-linked ultra-high-molecular-weight polyethylene acetabular components with residual free radicals". The Journal of Arthroplasty. 21 (7): 1005–11. doi:10.1016/j.arth.2005.07.019. PMID 17027543.
- Bragdon, C. R.; Barrett, S; Martell, J. M.; Greene, M. E.; Malchau, H; Harris, W. H. (2006). "Steady-state penetration rates of electron beam-irradiated, highly cross-linked polyethylene at an average 45-month follow-up". The Journal of Arthroplasty. 21 (7): 935–43. doi:10.1016/j.arth.2006.01.006. PMID 17027534.
- Hendricks, K. J.; Harris, W. H. (2006). "High placement of noncemented acetabular components in revision total hip arthroplasty. A concise follow-up, at a minimum of fifteen years, of a previous report". The Journal of Bone and Joint Surgery. American Volume. 88 (10): 2231–6. doi:10.2106/JBJS.E.00247. PMID 17015601.
- Bragdon, C. R.; Martell, J. M.; Greene, M. E.; Estok Dm, 2nd; Thanner, J; Kärrholm, J; Harris, W. H.; Malchau, H (2006). "Comparison of femoral head penetration using RSA and the Martell method". Clinical Orthopaedics and Related Research. 448: 52–7. doi:10.1097/01.blo.0000224018.88410.83. PMID 16826096. S2CID 10392196.
- Bragdon, C. R.; Thanner, J; Greene, M. E.; Malchau, H; Digas, G; Harris, W. H.; Kärrholm, J (2006). "Standing versus supine radiographs in RSA evaluation of femoral head penetration". Clinical Orthopaedics and Related Research. 448: 46–51. doi:10.1097/01.blo.0000224012.50292.67. PMID 16826095. S2CID 45931929.
- Hampton, B. J.; Harris, W. H. (2006). "Primary cementless acetabular components in hips with severe developmental dysplasia or total dislocation. A concise follow-up, at an average of sixteen years, of a previous report". The Journal of Bone and Joint Surgery. American Volume. 88 (7): 1549–52. doi:10.2106/JBJS.E.00624. PMID 16818981.
- Geller, J. A.; Malchau, H; Bragdon, C; Greene, M; Harris, W. H.; Freiberg, A. A. (2006). "Large diameter femoral heads on highly cross-linked polyethylene: Minimum 3-year results". Clinical Orthopaedics and Related Research. 447: 53–9. doi:10.1097/01.blo.0000218742.61624.80. PMID 16741475. S2CID 10035649.
- Plank, G. R.; Estok Dm, 2nd; Muratoglu, O. K.; O'Connor, D. O.; Burroughs, B. R.; Harris, W. H. (2007). "Contact stress assessment of conventional and highly crosslinked ultra high molecular weight polyethylene acetabular liners with finite element analysis and pressure sensitive film". Journal of Biomedical Materials Research Part B: Applied Biomaterials. 80 (1): 1–10. doi:10.1002/jbm.b.30560. PMID 16680685.
- Hendricks, K. J.; Harris, W. H. (2006). "Revision of failed acetabular components with use of so-called jumbo noncemented components. A concise follow-up of a previous report". The Journal of Bone and Joint Surgery. American Volume. 88 (3): 559–63. doi:10.2106/JBJS.E.00389. PMID 16510823.
- Jamali, A. A.; Lozynsky, A. J.; Harris, W. H. (2006). "The effect of surface finish and of vertical ribs on the stability of a cemented femoral stem: An in vitro stair climbing test". The Journal of Arthroplasty. 21 (1): 122–8. doi:10.1016/j.arth.2005.05.018. PMID 16446196.
- Wannomae, K. K.; Christensen, S. D.; Freiberg, A. A.; Bhattacharyya, S; Harris, W. H.; Muratoglu, O. K. (2006). "The effect of real-time aging on the oxidation and wear of highly cross-linked UHMWPE acetabular liners". Biomaterials. 27 (9): 1980–7. doi:10.1016/j.biomaterials.2005.10.002. PMID 16271756.
- Manning, D. W.; Ponce, B. A.; Chiang, P. P.; Harris, W. H.; Burke, D. W. (2005). "Isolated acetabular revision through the posterior approach: Short-term results after revision of a recalled acetabular component". The Journal of Arthroplasty. 20 (6): 723–9. doi:10.1016/j.arth.2004.11.009. PMID 16139708.
- Muratoglu, O. K.; Wannomae, K; Christensen, S; Rubash, H. E.; Harris, W. H. (2005). "Ex vivo wear of conventional and cross-linked polyethylene acetabular liners". Clinical Orthopaedics and Related Research. 438 (438): 158–64. doi:10.1097/01.blo.0000164407.02998.8d. PMID 16131885. S2CID 40576670.
- Bragdon, C. R.; Martell, J. M.; Estok Dm, 2nd; Greene, M. E.; Malchau, H; Harris, W. H. (2005). "A new approach for the Martell 3-D method of measuring polyethylene wear without requiring the cross-table lateral films". Journal of Orthopaedic Research. 23 (4): 720–5. doi:10.1016/j.orthres.2004.07.008. PMID 16022982. S2CID 2234241.
- Oral, E; Greenbaum, E. S.; Malhi, A. S.; Harris, W. H.; Muratoglu, O. K. (2005). "Characterization of irradiated blends of alpha-tocopherol and UHMWPE". Biomaterials. 26 (33): 6657–63. doi:10.1016/j.biomaterials.2005.04.026. PMC 1463566. PMID 15993487.
- Bragdon, C. R.; Doherty, A. M.; Jasty, M; Rubash, H; Harris, W. H. (2005). "Effect of oral alendronate on net bone ingrowth into canine cementless total hips". The Journal of Arthroplasty. 20 (2): 258–63. doi:10.1016/j.arth.2004.03.027. PMID 15902867.
- Estok Dm, 2nd; Bragdon, C. R.; Plank, G. R.; Huang, A; Muratoglu, O. K.; Harris, W. H. (2005). "The measurement of creep in ultrahigh molecular weight polyethylene: A comparison of conventional versus highly cross-linked polyethylene". The Journal of Arthroplasty. 20 (2): 239–43. doi:10.1016/j.arth.2004.08.008. PMID 15902864.
- Bragdon, C. R.; Jasty, M; Muratoglu, O. K.; Harris, W. H. (2005). "Third-body wear testing of a highly cross-linked acetabular liner: The effect of large femoral head size in the presence of particulate poly(methyl-methacrylate) debris". The Journal of Arthroplasty. 20 (3): 379–85. doi:10.1016/j.arth.2004.09.035. PMID 15809958.
- Bragdon, C. R.; Jasty, M; Greene, M; Rubash, H. E.; Harris, W. H. (2004). "Biologic fixation of total hip implants. Insights gained from a series of canine studies". The Journal of Bone and Joint Surgery. American Volume. 86-A Suppl 2: 105–17. doi:10.2106/00004623-200412002-00015. PMID 15691115.
- Harris, W. H.; Muratoglu, O. K. (2005). "A review of current cross-linked polyethylenes used in total joint arthroplasty". Clinical Orthopaedics and Related Research. 430 (430): 46–52. doi:10.1097/01.blo.0000152603.58384.e9. PMID 15662303.
- Burroughs, B. R.; Hallstrom, B; Golladay, G. J.; Hoeffel, D; Harris, W. H. (2005). "Range of motion and stability in total hip arthroplasty with 28-, 32-, 38-, and 44-mm femoral head sizes". The Journal of Arthroplasty. 20 (1): 11–9. doi:10.1016/j.arth.2004.07.008. PMID 15660054.
- Harris, W. H. (2004). "Highly cross-linked, electron-beam-irradiated, melted polyethylene: Some pros". Clinical Orthopaedics and Related Research (429): 63–7. doi:10.1097/01.blo.0000149827.55160.42. PMID 15577467.
- Harris, W. H. (2004). "Conquest of a worldwide human disease: Particle-induced periprosthetic osteolysis". Clinical Orthopaedics and Related Research (429): 39–42. doi:10.1097/01.blo.0000149821.72760.39. PMID 15577463.
- Muratoglu, O. K.; Burroughs, B. R.; Bragdon, C. R.; Christensen, S; Lozynsky, A; Harris, W. H. (2004). "Knee simulator wear of polyethylene tibias articulating against explanted rough femoral components". Clinical Orthopaedics and Related Research. 428 (428): 108–13. doi:10.1097/01.blo.0000143801.41885.8b. PMID 15534529. S2CID 25891144.
- Muratoglu, O. K.; Bragdon, C. R.; Jasty, M; O'Connor, D. O.; von Knoch, R. S.; Harris, W. H. (2004). "Knee-simulator testing of conventional and cross-linked polyethylene tibial inserts". The Journal of Arthroplasty. 19 (7): 887–97. doi:10.1016/j.arth.2004.03.019. PMID 15483806.
- Jamali, A. A.; Dungy, D. S.; Mark, A; Schule, S; Harris, W. H. (2004). "Isolated acetabular revision with use of the Harris-Galante Cementless Component. Study with intermediate-term follow-up". The Journal of Bone and Joint Surgery. American Volume. 86-A (8): 1690–7. doi:10.2106/00004623-200408000-00012. PMID 15292416. S2CID 10805404.
- O'Keefe Jr, J. H.; Cordain, L; Harris, W. H.; Moe, R. M.; Vogel, R (2004). "Optimal low-density lipoprotein is 50 to 70 mg/dl: Lower is better and physiologically normal". Journal of the American College of Cardiology. 43 (11): 2142–6. doi:10.1016/j.jacc.2004.03.046. PMID 15172426.
- Hallstrom, B. R.; Golladay, G. J.; Vittetoe, D. A.; Harris, W. H. (2004). "Cementless acetabular revision with the Harris-Galante porous prosthesis. Results after a minimum of ten years of follow-up". The Journal of Bone and Joint Surgery. American Volume. 86-A (5): 1007–11. doi:10.2106/00004623-200405000-00018. PMID 15118045.
- Bragdon, C. R.; Estok, D. M.; Malchau, H; Kärrholm, J; Yuan, X; Bourne, R; Veldhoven, J; Harris, W. H. (2004). "Comparison of two digital radiostereometric analysis methods in the determination of femoral head penetration in a total hip replacement phantom". Journal of Orthopaedic Research. 22 (3): 659–64. doi:10.1016/j.orthres.2003.09.004. PMID 15099649. S2CID 42174432.
- Bozic, K. J.; Freiberg, A. A.; Harris, W. H. (2004). "The high hip center". Clinical Orthopaedics and Related Research. 420 (420): 101–5. doi:10.1097/00003086-200403000-00014. PMID 15057084.
- Greenbaum, E. S.; Burroughs, B. B.; Harris, W. H.; Muratoglu, O. K. (2004). "Effect of lipid absorption on wear and compressive properties of unirradiated and highly crosslinked UHMWPE: An in vitro experimental model". Biomaterials. 25 (18): 4479–84. doi:10.1016/j.biomaterials.2003.11.049. PMID 15046938.
- Muratoglu, O. K.; Greenbaum, E. S.; Bragdon, C. R.; Jasty, M; Freiberg, A. A.; Harris, W. H. (2004). "Surface analysis of early retrieved acetabular polyethylene liners: A comparison of conventional and highly crosslinked polyethylenes". The Journal of Arthroplasty. 19 (1): 68–77. doi:10.1016/j.arth.2003.08.003. PMID 14716654.
- Muratoglu, O. K.; Merrill, E. W.; Bragdon, C. R.; O'Connor, D; Hoeffel, D; Burroughs, B; Jasty, M; Harris, W. H. (2003). "Effect of radiation, heat, and aging on in vitro wear resistance of polyethylene". Clinical Orthopaedics and Related Research. 416 (417): 253–62. doi:10.1097/01.blo.0000093004.90435.d1. PMID 14646724. S2CID 35609707.
- Harris, W. H. (2003). "Results of uncemented cups: A critical appraisal at 15 years". Clinical Orthopaedics and Related Research (417): 121–5. doi:10.1097/01.blo.0000096824.67494.aa. PMID 14646709. S2CID 5941050.
- Bragdon, C. R.; Doherty, A. M.; Rubash, H. E.; Jasty, M; Li, X. J.; Seeherman, H; Harris, W. H. (2003). "The efficacy of BMP-2 to induce bone ingrowth in a total hip replacement model". Clinical Orthopaedics and Related Research (417): 50–61. doi:10.1097/01.blo.0000096811.78689.2b. PMID 14646702. S2CID 23889465.
- Muratoglu, O. K.; Ruberti, J; Melotti, S; Spiegelberg, S. H.; Greenbaum, E. S.; Harris, W. H. (2003). "Optical analysis of surface changes on early retrievals of highly cross-linked and conventional polyethylene tibial inserts". The Journal of Arthroplasty. 18 (7 Suppl 1): 42–7. doi:10.1016/s0883-5403(03)00293-6. PMID 14560410.
- Santavirta, S; Böhler, M; Harris, W. H.; Konttinen, Y. T.; Lappalainen, R; Muratoglu, O; Rieker, C; Salzer, M (2003). "Alternative materials to improve total hip replacement tribology". Acta Orthopaedica. 74 (4): 380–8. doi:10.1080/00016470310017668. PMID 14521286. S2CID 11289681.
- Bragdon, C. R.; Jasty, M; Muratoglu, O. K.; O'Connor, D. O.; Harris, W. H. (2003). "Third-body wear of highly cross-linked polyethylene in a hip simulator". The Journal of Arthroplasty. 18 (5): 553–61. doi:10.1016/s0883-5403(03)00146-3. PMID 12934205.
- Harris, W. H. (2003). ""The lysis threshold": An erroneous and perhaps misleading concept?". The Journal of Arthroplasty. 18 (4): 506–10. doi:10.1016/s0883-5403(03)00153-0. PMID 12820096.
- Muratoglu, O. K.; Perinchief, R. S.; Bragdon, C. R.; O'Connor, D. O.; Konrad, R; Harris, W. H. (2003). "Metrology to quantify wear and creep of polyethylene tibial knee inserts". Clinical Orthopaedics and Related Research. 410 (410): 155–64. doi:10.1097/01.blo.0000063604.67412.04. PMID 12771826. S2CID 9012599.
- Gul, R. M.; McGarry, F. J.; Bragdon, C. R.; Muratoglu, O. K.; Harris, W. H. (2003). "Effect of consolidation on adhesive and abrasive wear of ultra high molecular weight polyethylene". Biomaterials. 24 (19): 3193–9. doi:10.1016/s0142-9612(03)00165-0. PMID 12763446.
- Muratoglu, O. K.; Delaney, J; O'Connor, D. O.; Harris, W. H. (2003). "The use of trans-vinylene formation in quantifying the spatial distribution of electron beam penetration in polyethylene. Single-sided, double-sided and shielded irradiation". Biomaterials. 24 (12): 2021–9. doi:10.1016/s0142-9612(02)00632-4. PMID 12628821.
- Katz, J. N.; Phillips, C. B.; Baron, J. A.; Fossel, A. H.; Mahomed, N. N.; Barrett, J; Lingard, E. A.; Harris, W. H.; Poss, R; Lew, R. A.; Guadagnoli, E; Wright, E. A.; Losina, E (2003). "Association of hospital and surgeon volume of total hip replacement with functional status and satisfaction three years following surgery". Arthritis & Rheumatism. 48 (2): 560–8. doi:10.1002/art.10754. PMID 12571867.
- Muratoglu, O. K.; Mark, A; Vittetoe, D. A.; Harris, W. H.; Rubash, H. E. (2003). "Polyethylene damage in total knees and use of highly crosslinked polyethylene". The Journal of Bone and Joint Surgery. American Volume. 85-A Suppl 1: S7–S13. doi:10.2106/00004623-200300001-00003. PMID 12540663.
- Mahomed, N. N.; Barrett, J. A.; Katz, J. N.; Phillips, C. B.; Losina, E; Lew, R. A.; Guadagnoli, E; Harris, W. H.; Poss, R; Baron, J. A. (2003). "Rates and outcomes of primary and revision total hip replacement in the United States medicare population". The Journal of Bone and Joint Surgery. American Volume. 85-A (1): 27–32. doi:10.2106/00004623-200301000-00005. PMID 12533568. S2CID 12046907.
- Phillips, C. B.; Barrett, J. A.; Losina, E; Mahomed, N. N.; Lingard, E. A.; Guadagnoli, E; Baron, J. A.; Harris, W. H.; Poss, R; Katz, J. N. (2003). "Incidence rates of dislocation, pulmonary embolism, and deep infection during the first six months after elective total hip replacement". The Journal of Bone and Joint Surgery. American Volume. 85-A (1): 20–6. doi:10.2106/00004623-200301000-00004. PMID 12533567. S2CID 25064643.
- Burroughs, B. R.; Rubash, H. E.; Harris, W. H. (2002). "Femoral head sizes larger than 32 mm against highly cross-linked polyethylene". Clinical Orthopaedics and Related Research. 405 (405): 150–7. doi:10.1097/00003086-200212000-00018. PMID 12461367.
- Maloney, W. J.; Schmalzried, T; Harris, W. H. (2002). "Analysis of long-term cemented total hip arthroplasty retrievals". Clinical Orthopaedics and Related Research. 405 (405): 70–8. doi:10.1097/00003086-200212000-00009. PMID 12461358. S2CID 33346613.
- Muratoglu, O. K.; Bragdon, C. R.; O'Connor, D. O.; Perinchief, R. S.; Jasty, M; Harris, W. H. (2002). "Aggressive wear testing of a cross-linked polyethylene in total knee arthroplasty". Clinical Orthopaedics and Related Research. 404 (404): 89–95. doi:10.1097/00003086-200211000-00015. PMID 12439243. S2CID 24231637.
- Behairy, Y. M.; Harris, W. H. (2002). "Mode of loosening of matt-finished femoral stems in primary total hip replacement". Saudi Medical Journal. 23 (10): 1187–94. PMID 12436120.
- Koenig, J. B.; Cote, N; Lamarre, J; Harris, W. H.; Trout, D. R.; Kenney, D. G.; Monteith, G (2002). "Binding of radiolabeled porcine motilin and erythromycin lactobionate to smooth muscle membranes in various segments of the equine gastrointestinal tract". American Journal of Veterinary Research. 63 (11): 1545–50. doi:10.2460/ajvr.2002.63.1545. PMID 12428665.
- Bragdon, C. R.; Malchau, H; Yuan, X; Perinchief, R; Kärrholm, J; Börlin, N; Estok, D. M.; Harris, W. H. (2002). "Experimental assessment of precision and accuracy of radiostereometric analysis for the determination of polyethylene wear in a total hip replacement model". Journal of Orthopaedic Research. 20 (4): 688–95. doi:10.1016/S0736-0266(01)00171-1. PMID 12168656. S2CID 8354839.
- Harrington Jr, M. A.; O'Connor, D. O.; Lozynsky, A. J.; Kovach, I; Harris, W. H. (2002). "Effects of femoral neck length, stem size, and body weight on strains in the proximal cement mantle". The Journal of Bone and Joint Surgery. American Volume. 84-A (4): 573–9. doi:10.2106/00004623-200204000-00010. PMID 11940617. S2CID 36823992.
- Andrews, P; Barrack, R. L.; Harris, W. H. (2002). "Stress fracture of the medial wall of the acetabulum adjacent to a cementless acetabular component". The Journal of Arthroplasty. 17 (1): 117–20. doi:10.1054/arth.2002.28733. PMID 11805938.
- Muratoglu, O. K.; O'Connor, D. O.; Bragdon, C. R.; Delaney, J; Jasty, M; Harris, W. H.; Merrill, E; Venugopalan, P (2002). "Gradient crosslinking of UHMWPE using irradiation in molten state for total joint arthroplasty". Biomaterials. 23 (3): 717–24. doi:10.1016/s0142-9612(01)00176-4. PMID 11771692.
