= Rowman & Littlefield Award in Innovative Teaching =

The Rowman & Littlefield Award in Innovative Teaching is the only national teaching award in political science given in the United States. It has been awarded annually by the American Political Science Association and was first awarded in 1996.

The award is sponsored by Rowman & Littlefield Publishers. It carries a 500 USD cash stipend and is presented at the APSA's Annual Meeting to a winner selected from political science professors nominated by members of the award committee, chaired by L. Sandy Maisel, Professor of Government and Director of the Goldfarb Center for Public Affairs and Civic Engagement at Colby College in Waterville, Maine.

According to the Association, the Award recognizes developers of "effective new approaches to teaching" among political scientists. Its intent is to honor a wide range of new directions, rather than one in particular. The annual winner is chosen from among a pool of nominees whose innovations had moved political science pedagogy forward.

== Recipients ==
=== 2008 ===
The 2008 award was presented to Professor Renée Van Vechten of the University of Redlands Department of Government. Van Vechten received the award for work done on collaborative simulations; she created and facilitated three simultaneous interactive simulations, one where her students simulated Members of Congress in her Congress course and two in her Introduction to American Governments courses, with one class playing lobbyists and the other playing the constituents of the Congressmembers.

=== 2007 ===
Professors James Meernik and Kimi King of the University of North Texas for their jointly taught study abroad class entitled International Law: Peace and Justice, an intensive three-week program at the International Criminal Tribunal for the former Yugoslavia (ICTY) in The Hague, Netherlands. Students receive access to top officials, including two of the ICTY presidents and 10 of the ICTY judges, as well as to attorneys and to tribunal testimony.

=== 2005 ===
The 2005 winner was Professor Barbara Allen of Carleton College.

Jeremy Mayer, a professor of public policy and political science at the School of Public Policy of George Mason University, is a past winner of the Award.
