= Harris Hip Score =

The Harris Hip Score (HHS) is a common evaluation instrument of the results of various hip disabilities and methods of treatment, especially for the assessment of hip replacement. It was developed by William H. Harris in 1969 with 30 patients who had suffered a fracture of the acetabulum or a luxation of the hip. The HHS contains 10 questions/ items, which can be divided in 4 categories: pain, function, range of motion and deformity. It scales from 0 to 100 points. Today, in most cases the version of Haddad et al. is used, where the calculation of the result of the category range of motion has been simplified. The HHS differs from other hip scores as it contains objective as well as subjective items. This has been sparked some controversies as results as the range of motion may be biased by the investigator. In recent years, (solely subjective) patient reported outcome measurement-tools have been developed such as the WOMAC-Score or the Forgotten Joint Score (FJS). Another issue with HHS lies in so called ceiling effects, as it does not allow to differentiate between a very good and an excellent result. However, the HHS still offers a valid and reproducible tool for the results of hip surgery, although comorbidities should be assessed simultaneously, for example with the Charnley-Score.
