= Winston Patrick Kuo =

Chinese-American computational biologist

Winston Patrick Kuo is a Chinese-American computational biologist who specializes in utilizing translational technologies to solve biomedical related issues. He is currently Assistant Professor in the Developmental Biology at Harvard School of Dental Medicine and Director of the Laboratory for Innovative Translational Technologies.

== Biography ==
Winston Kuo completed his education at Columbia University earning his dental degree, as well as a DMSc from Harvard Medical School and a MS from MIT. He went on to complete a two-year dental General Practice Residency program at Catholic Medical Center in Brooklyn, New York.

== Research ==
He was the first to compare DNA microarray platforms on a large scale. He further developed a framework for comparing DNA microarrays at a graduate student in Connie Cepko's lab in the Department of Genetics, Harvard Medical School, which addressed issues related to the reliability of DNA microarrays.
