= James Kuo =

CEO and Chairman of the Board of Salt Lake City

James Kuo is founder, CEO and Chairman of the Board of Salt Lake City-based BioMicro Systems, a company that makes research tools that control fluids by using hydrophilic (water-attracting) and hydrophobic (water-repelling) materials instead disruptive mechanical or electrical components.

== Early life and career ==
Kuo was born in Taiwan and came to the United States at the age of three. He earned an undergraduate degree at Haverford College in Haverford, Pa., a medical degree at the University of Pennsylvania, and a Master of Business Administration from its Wharton School.

Kuo launched his career by combining his medical degree with his MBA to become a guru in the high-stakes business of discovering and developing promising drug candidates.

At the age of 27, Kuo was already director of a $380 million fund at America's leading biotech venture capital firm. He helped launch Human Genome Sciences and Genetic Therapy Inc. Five years later he became CEO of Discovery Laboratories, an unfunded startup, and within six months raised $22 million through private placement. He then became Managing Director of Venture Analysis at HealthCare Ventures, a $378 million venture fund. In 2001 he became CEO of Microbiotix, Inc. Earlier in his career Kuo held senior business development positions at Pfizer, Genset Corporation and Myriad Genetics. Kuo also serves on the board of DOR BioPharma (AMEX: DOR), among other positions.

In February 2010, Kuo was appointed as Chairman, CEO and President of Adeona Pharmaceuticals, Inc.
