= David Thornburgh =

David Bradford Thornburgh (born October 6, 1958) is senior advisor and former president and CEO of the Committee of Seventy, an independent government reform group in Philadelphia, Pennsylvania. In 2016, he took on partisan gerrymandering in PA as the co-founder of the Draw the Lines project. Draw the Lines enlisted over 7,000 Pennsylvanians in drawing new Congressional maps to make it clear that the redistricting process should be open and transparent. The Citizens' Map drawn with date from those individual maps was one of the final set of maps considered by the Pennsylvania Supreme Court and was recognized for its creative and extensive use of citizen input.

In 2021 he served as the Chair of Ballot PA, a statewide advocacy campaign to restore the right of Pennsylvania's 1.3 million voters to vote in primary elections, which had been taken away by a law passed in 1937. He was successful in raising over $2 million for that campaign, which resulted in bipartisan bills in both the PA House and Senate. The House bill passed out of committee—the first time such a bill had moved so far—and as September 2024 was poised for a vote by the full House.

Prior to joining Seventy in December 2014, he served as executive director of the University of Pennsylvania's Fels Institute of Government. He is a frequent commentator on regional development, public policy and civic affairs. He has been recognized by Leadership Philadelphia as one of the most trusted and respected civic "connectors" in the Philadelphia area. He is the son of former Pennsylvania governor and U.S. Attorney General Dick Thornburgh.

Thornburgh graduated from Haverford College in Haverford, Pennsylvania with a B.A. in political science. He later attended Harvard Kennedy School, where he received a Master of Public Policy (MPP) degree. In 2024 he received an honorary Doctor of Public Policy from Dickinson College.

Thornburgh went on to become the director of civic affairs at the CIGNA Corporation in Philadelphia. In 1988 Thornburgh was appointed as director of the Wharton Small Business Development Center, the consulting and training arm of the Wharton School's top-ranked Entrepreneurial Center, where he helped 20,000 entrepreneurs start and grow their businesses, raise $40 million in additional capital, and in the process create 4,000 new jobs in the region. In 1994, he left the SBDC to become the executive director of the Economy League of Greater Philadelphia, one of the nation's oldest and most respected private sector-led regional "think and do" tanks. While at the Economy League, he led efforts to reduce and restructure local taxes, improve the quality of the regional workforce, invest in arts and culture, and position the Philadelphia as an entrepreneurial, knowledge-based economy. Following his time at the Economy League, in 2006, Thornburgh was named president and CEO of the Alliance for Regional Stewardship, a best-practice network of regional leaders in communities across the United States.

== Awards ==
Thornburgh has received numerous awards, including an Eisenhower Fellowship in 2000 and was a finalist for the White House Fellowship in 1992. In 1991 he was chosen by the "Philadelphia Business Journal" as one of '40 Business Leaders Under 40'. In 2006 he was honored as one of the 101 most trusted and civic “connectors” in the Philadelphia area by LEADERSHIP Philadelphia.

He was awarded Doctor of Public Policy by Dickinson College in 2024.

== Personal life ==
He and his wife Rebecca McKillip Thornburgh, a Wharton-MBA turned children's book author/illustrator, have lived in the Chestnut Hill section of Philadelphia since 1996. Their two daughters, Blair and Alice, were born and raised there and attended and graduated from Germantown Friends School. Lifelong musicians, Rebecca and David performed for nearly 20 years in an alt-country band called Reckless Amateurs. He is a lifelong scuba diver.
