= Ellen Rometsch =

German club hostess

Bertha Hildegard Elly Rometsch (a.k.a. Ellen Rometsch, September 19, 1936 in Kleinitz, then in Germany, since 1945 in Poland) is a German former model who was the wife of a West German diplomat. In the United States, allegations circulated during the early 1960s that she was an East German spy assigned under diplomatic cover to the West German embassy in Washington. During that time, Rometsch was thought in some Washington journalism circles to have been a mistress of President John F. Kennedy. However, the FBI conducted an investigation and dismissed claims that Rometsch was a spy or that she has had relations with President Kennedy.

== Early life ==
Towards the end of World War II her family, in which she was one of seven children, fled Kleinitz (since 1945 Klenica, Poland) and settled in Kreinitz near Riesa (in the Soviet occupation zone, since 1949 part of East Germany), where her parents were given an estate in Kreinitz. Ellen was a member of the Free German Youth and worked as a stenographer for the Socialist Unity Party (SED) district administration.

When agriculture was to be forcibly collectivized in East Germany, the family moved to West Germany in 1955, and her parents leased an estate, Gut Oberberge, near Schwelm. There she did a business apprenticeship, got married for the first time and was divorced shortly afterwards. In Siegburg she married German air force sergeant Rolf Rometsch, took his family name Rometsch and had a son in 1958. On April 6, 1961 Sergeant Rolf Rometsch was assigned to the German Logistic Office in Washington, D.C., with his wife and son. The couple lived on Military Road in Arlington County, Virginia until August 1963.

== Alleged affair with John F. Kennedy ==
She first appeared in Washington as a photo model under the pseudonym Ellen Rometsch. She met Nancy Carole Tyler, the secretary of Senate staffer Bobby Baker. Baker later found her a job as a hostess for the Quorum Club at the Carroll Arms Hotel on Capitol Hill, adjacent to a Senate office building. It was a private club, founded by Baker requiring annual membership dues and was used by lawmakers and other influential men to meet for food, drink, and engage in dalliances with ladies away from the press that were constantly downstairs at the bar in the hotel lobby. It was during the summer of 1963 that, according to later claims by Baker, the President of the United States, John F. Kennedy, met 27-year-old Ellen Rometsch and allegedly began an affair with her. Rometsch had worked in the Quorum Club for about two years before allegedly starting her affair with Kennedy.

Rometsch had apparently disclosed details of her illicit relations with highly placed government officials that she had met at the club, to a former FBI informant of questionable reliability. Because she had been born in East Germany and was rumored to have once worked for Walter Ulbricht, the FBI decided to investigate her. Attorney General Robert F. Kennedy was informed of the planned investigation on July 3, 1963. On July 12, 1963, Rometsch was interviewed by the FBI and it was concluded that the security allegations against her were not warranted and the high-level sex contacts were unsubstantiated.

However, due to the sensation that the Profumo affair in the United Kingdom had created in the press and because the US State Department could not remove Rometsch without disclosing a specific reason to the West German authorities, it was decided that the information developed by the FBI would be transmitted via liaison to the State Department and then be made available discreetly to West German authorities. On August 14, 1963, Sgt. Rometsch was informed by his superiors of the allegations being made against his wife and that he was therefore being recalled back to West Germany in one week. Rometsch was expelled from the U.S. on August 21, 1963, "because of her behavior in Washington", behavior which according to media reports threatened to have scandalous overtones reminiscent of the Profumo affair.

The allegations involving Rometsch and her subsequent removal from the U.S., were brought to the public's attention through a front page article written by Clark R. Mollenhoff in the October 26, 1963, issue of the Des Moines Register. Mollenhoff said her circle included "several congressional figures" and "several high executive branch officials" and "moved in a crowd that included some well-known New Frontier figures", and that she led a life that "could not be financed on the pay of a non commissioned West German soldier." A few days later Clark Mollenhoff asked President Kennedy at a live televised press conference if he is fulfilling the requirements of his Code of Ethics. In his response Kennedy seemed to make a veiled reference to the Rometsch story Mollenhoff had just written by saying, "I have always believed that innuendoes should be justified before they are made, either by me and the Congress, or even in the press." Years later however, in 2013, Bobby Baker seemed to endorse some of the claims made by Mollenoff by claiming that he was the one who introduced Ellen Rometsch to one of President Kennedy's closest friends, Bill Thompson while they were at the Quorum Club. Thompson allegedly asked if Rometsch could accompany him for dinner at the White House and Baker arranged for Rometsch to be taken to Bill Thompson's apartment where they drove to the White House together to have dinner with the President "on many occasions".

Rometsch was also alleged to be a call girl, which she also denied, and was investigated by the Federal Bureau of Investigation to determine if she had been working as an East German spy. Although FBI director J. Edgar Hoover met privately with Senators Mike Mansfield and Everett Dirksen telling them there was "no evidence" that Rometsch was a spy, he then proceeded to tell them details about the senators who had been "entertained" by Quorum Club girls.

According to reports, Robert F. Kennedy desired to squelch any press reports of his brother's alleged involvement with Rometsch, which led him to seek Hoover's help in discouraging any mention of the Rometsch "allegations" in the Senate investigation of Bobby Baker, who held the post of Senate Secretary for the Majority until he resigned on October 7, 1963. According to biographer Evan Thomas, Robert Kennedy had Rometsch deported to cover up an alleged extramarital affair John F. Kennedy had with her. Rometsch denied the sexual and spying allegations. Rometsch's husband likewise denies newspaper reports that payments to a Liechtenstein account were made to the couple. Although it became public that Ellen Rometsch was suspected of espionage, John F. Kennedy's name did not appear public in this context at the time. The press release on Ellen Rometsch was published in November 1963. The FBI created a 478-page file on Rometsch with the code number 105-122316, which was only closed in 1987 and is now publicly available. According to the documents, Kennedy's successor Lyndon B. Johnson requested "a summary of the Ellen Rometsch case" in February 1964. The FBI assigned Rometsch to a group of women, the majority of whom were of German origin, "who offered their services as 'play girls' to various people inside and outside the government." Some of them are said to be prominent and to be in the public eye. According to the allegations in the file, this ring was responsible for "personal escapades, prostitution, partying, sex orgies, and so forth."

However, the East German government's subsequently revealed Stasi archives seem to corroborate FBI's official conclusion that Rometsch was not in their service. Archives contain no record of her nor any members of Rometsch's family, who once lived in Saxony, in the intelligence files. Together with the findings of Western intelligence agencies, everything therefore suggests that the former West German immigrant citizen never spied for the East. According to writer Darwin Porter, The Baker-run Quorum club was itself part of honeypot-like operations in service of American intelligence agencies spying on senators and other politicians.

== After the expulsion ==
On September 27, 1963, one month after their expulsion, she was divorced from her husband at the Bonn Regional Court because of "the woman's sole fault" and moved to live with her parents on the Westphalian Oberberge estate near today's Schwelm. She worked as a milkmaid on the farm, helped out with the beet harvest and raised her son. There she was tracked down in late October 1963 by media representatives. The British tabloid Daily Express offered Rometsch 55,000 Deutsche Marks for her memories. In October 1964 she gave a short interview to the Hamburg magazine Stern.

Rometsch lives near Bonn, has remarried Rolf Rometsch and has retired from public life.

== Bibliography ==
- Thomas, Evan (2000). Robert Kennedy: His Life. New York, NY: Simon and Schuster. ISBN 978-0-684-83480-1.
