= F. Palmer Weber =

American activist and politician (1914–1986)

- Born: March 18, 1914
- Died: August 22, 1986 (aged 72)
- Occupations: Activist, Businessman
- Children: 2, including Michael J. Weber

Frederick Palmer Weber (March 18, 1914 – August 22, 1986) was an American activist and businessman. Born in Smithfield, Virginia, he became involved in radical politics when he was sent to a tuberculosis sanatorium as a teenager.

== Academic career and involvement with the University of Virginia ==
Weber studied philosophy at the University of Virginia, from which received a B.A. in 1934, an M.A. in 1938, and Ph.D. in 1940. While a student, he was a member of Phi Beta Kappa and the Raven Society and was active in radical politics with, among others, David Carliner. Nominated three times for a Rhodes Scholarship, he was denied the prize because of his criticism of British policy in India and other causes.

Between 1934 and 1940, he served as an instructor in Philosophy and Economics. Around 1968, he returned to Charlottesville, where he helped to found the Lawn Society, a fundraising group for the University. He also became a founding member of the Associates of the White Burkett Miller Center for the Study of the Presidency, and an adviser to the Carter G. Woodson Institute for African-American and African Studies.

There are three endowed professorships at UVA named after him: The F. Palmer Weber Research Professorship in Civil Liberties and Human Rights in the School of Law; and the F. Palmer Weber Medical Research Professorship, and the F. Palmer Weber - Smithfield Foods Professorship for Oncology in the School of Medicine.

== Political career ==
After receiving his Ph.D. he moved to Washington, D.C. and was a member of Franklin D. Roosevelt's New Deal group known as the Brain Trust. He served as staff director for the House of Representatives Tolan Committee to Investigate the Concentration of Economic Power; staff director for Sen. Claude Pepper's Committee on Education and Labor, founder of the National Committee to Abolish the Poll Tax, and he served on the staff of the Kilgore Committee.

In 1944, he became research director of the Political Action Committee for the CIO. In 1946 he was elected to the National Board of the NAACP. He served for a time on the ACLU President's Advisory Committee.

He served on the boards of The Washington Spectator, and the Southern Regional Council.

In 1948 he became Southern Regional Director for the Progressive Party, and ran that portion of former Vice President (under President Roosevelt) Henry A. Wallace's presidential campaign with co-director Louis Burnham. Because of the Progressive Party's association with Communism, the Wallace campaign was the end of his career in mainstream politics.

== Senate testimony ==
On April 21, 1953, he was questioned by the United States Senate Subcommittee on Internal Security as part of an ongoing effort to find Communists in the US government. His testimony avoided answering questions directly, and digressed into fine points of constitutional law and philosophy.

== Business career ==
Exiled from politics, he was still able to work on Wall Street. Beginning in 1954 he worked for Morris Cohan and Co, then Troster-Singer, then Spear, Leeds & Kellogg, then Tucker Anthony and Day, which was ultimately purchased by John Hancock Insurance. He also served on the board of Smithfield Foods. Weber was a member of Business Executives Against the Vietnam War, and supported Senator Eugene McCarthy's bid for the presidency in 1968.

== Notable family members ==
His adoptive son, Michael J. Weber, was a director of the University of Virginia Cancer Center.
