= PSCI =

PSCI may refer to:

- Park Street Collegiate Institute, a former high school in Orillia, Ontario, Canada
- Penn State Cancer Institute, US
- PowerShares S&P SmallCap Industrials Portfolio (NASDAQ: PSCI), in Invesco PowerShares
- PSCI, owner of PSC-Naval Dockyard, Malaysia
- The Power State Coordination Interface, used for power management in the ARM architecture

== See also ==
- Pisces I (Psc I) a galaxy
- Iota Piscium (ι Psc) a star
