= Thomas Loughran =

Thomas Loughran may refer to:

- Tommy Loughran (1902–1982), American boxer
- Thomas P. Loughran Jr., American physician-scientist
