= Vinod P. Balachandran =

American immunologist

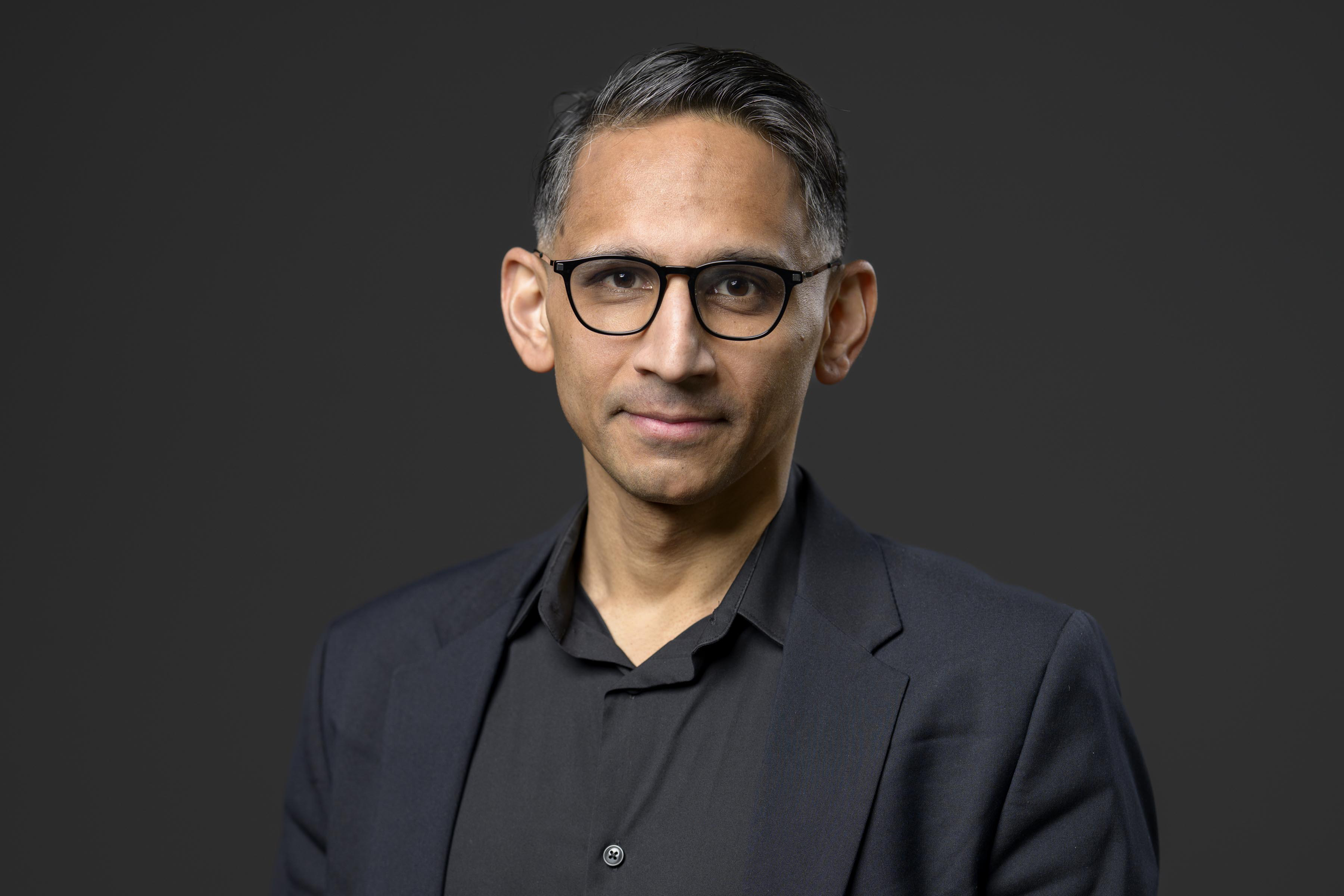
- Born: 1980 (age 45–46); United States
- Education: Cornell University State University of New York at Stony Brook
- Known for: Cancer vaccines; Pancreatic cancer; Immunotherapy; Precision immuno-oncology; Surgical oncology
- Awards: Trailblazer Prize for Clinical Scientists, Foundation for the NIH; AAISCR Outstanding Scientist Award; 2025 TIME100 Most Influential People in Health; 2025 Washington Post’s Next 50; Elected Member, American Society for Clinical Investigation
- Scientific career
- Institutions: Memorial Sloan Kettering Cancer Center
- Website: The Vinod Balachandran Lab

Vinod P. Balachandran (born 1980) is an American surgical oncologist. As a surgeon and scientist at Memorial Sloan Kettering Cancer Center, he led the discovery and clinical development of RNA vaccines for pancreatic cancer. Balachandran is the founding Director of The Olayan Center for Cancer Vaccines at Memorial Sloan Kettering Cancer Center, and holds the Hutham S. Olayan and Robert F. Raucci chair. Balachandran’s research focuses on discovering new immunotherapies to treat pancreatic cancer.

== Early life and education ==
Balachandran was born in 1980 in the United States. His mother was the director of cytotechnology at the Albany College of Pharmacy, while his father was a professor of physics at Syracuse University. Balachandran earned a Bachelor of Arts in Physics from Cornell University in 2001. He then received his Doctor of Medicine from the State University of New York at Stony Brook in 2006, followed by a residency in general surgery at New York-Presbyterian Hospital. Balachandran then completed fellowships in Tumor Immunology and Complex Surgical Oncology Fellowship at Memorial Sloan Kettering.

== Career ==
Balachandran joined the faculty at the Memorial Sloan Kettering Cancer Center in 2015. While there, he has led research to identify new ways to treat pancreatic cancer with immunotherapy. He is an Attending Hepatopancreatobiliary Surgeon and Laboratory Head in the Immuno-Oncology Program at Memorial Sloan Kettering, as well as a Professor of Surgery at Weill Cornell Medical College. In 2024, Balachandran established The Olayan Center for Cancer Vaccines at Memorial Sloan Kettering Cancer Center as its founding director, and was named the Hutham S. Olayan and Robert F. Raucci Chair in 2025. Balachandran was elected to the American Society for Clinical Investigation in 2026.

== Research ==
Balachandran and his team have been credited with discovering new mechanisms of natural anti-tumor immunity in pancreatic cancer patients and harnessing these findings to develop new clinical immunotherapies.

In 2017, Balachandran’s lab discovered that rare long-term survivors of pancreatic cancer develop natural immunity to mutation-derived neoantigens. The discovery challenged the assumption that pancreatic cancer, a tumor with few mutations, is immunologically inert, incapable of generating immunogenic neoantigens, and therefore unsuited for immunotherapy. Balachandran then led clinical development of the first phase-1 clinical trial of personalized cancer neoantigen vaccines, autogene cevumeran, for pancreatic cancer. The team discovered that vaccines triggered a strong immune response in half of the treated patients that correlated with delayed recurrence. In long-term follow-up, the study found that eight of 16 vaccinated participants had a lasting immune response, and seven of those participants remained alive up to six years following treatment.

In complementary work, Balachandran’s team discovered a new potential therapeutic target that boosts local immunity in pancreatic cancer. His research team found that the cytokine IL-33 can activate a unique type of immune cell enriched in long-term survivors of pancreatic cancer – group 2 innate lymphoid cells (ILC2s) – to boost anti-tumor immunity. Further studies in mice showed this is mediated by formation of tertiary lymphoid structures (TLSs), specialized clusters of immune cells that form in chronically inflamed tissues, including tumors, and help boost the immune response locally. Based on these findings, the team has designed an IL-33 drug candidate.

== Awards ==
- 2017 AACR/Pancreatic Cancer Action Network Career Development Award
- 2017 Damon Runyon Clinical Investigator Award
- 2017 Society for Immunotherapy of Cancer (SITC) Presidential Award
- 2018 National Pancreas Foundation Rising Star Award
- 2019 Phillip A. Sharp Award for Innovation in Collaboration
- 2020 Pershing Square Sohn Prize for Young Investigators in Cancer Research
- 2023 Trailblazer Prize for Clinical Scientists, Foundation for the NIH
- 2024 Yvonne Award for Breakthrough Research, Oncodaily
- 2025 AAISCR Outstanding Scientist Award
- 2025 TIME100 Most Influential People in Health
- 2025 Washington Post’s Next 50

== Selected Publications ==
- Sethna, Zachary; Guasp, Pablo; Reiche, Charlotte; Milighetti, Martina; Ceglia, Nicholas; Patterson, Erin; Lihm, Jayon; Payne, George; Lyudovyk, Olga; Rojas, Luis A.; Pang, Nan; Ohmoto, Akihiro; Amisaki, Masataka; Zebboudj, Abderezak; Odgerel, Zagaa (March 27, 2025). "RNA neoantigen vaccines prime long-lived CD8+ T cells in pancreatic cancer". Nature. 639 (8056): 1042–1051. doi:10.1038/s41586-024-08508-4. ISSN 0028-0836. PMC 11946889. PMID 39972124.
- Amisaki, Masataka; Zebboudj, Abderezak; Yano, Hiroshi; Zhang, Siqi Linsey; Payne, George; Chandra, Adrienne Kaya; Yu, Rebecca; Guasp, Pablo; Sethna, Zachary M.; Ohmoto, Akihiro; Rojas, Luis A.; Cheng, Charlotte; Waters, Theresa; Solovyov, Alexander; Martis, Stephen (February 27, 2025). "IL-33-activated ILC2s induce tertiary lymphoid structures in pancreatic cancer". Nature. 638 (8052): 1076–1084. Bibcode:2025Natur.638.1076A. doi:10.1038/s41586-024-08426-5. ISSN 0028-0836. PMC 11864983. PMID 39814891.
- Rojas, Luis A.; Sethna, Zachary; Soares, Kevin C.; Olcese, Cristina; Pang, Nan; Patterson, Erin; Lihm, Jayon; Ceglia, Nicholas; Guasp, Pablo; Chu, Alexander; Yu, Rebecca; Chandra, Adrienne Kaya; Waters, Theresa; Ruan, Jennifer; Amisaki, Masataka (June 1, 2023). "Personalized RNA neoantigen vaccines stimulate T cells in pancreatic cancer". Nature. 618 (7963): 144–150. Bibcode:2023Natur.618..144R. doi:10.1038/s41586-023-06063-y. ISSN 0028-0836. PMC 10171177. PMID 37165196.
- Łuksza, Marta; Sethna, Zachary M.; Rojas, Luis A.; Lihm, Jayon; Bravi, Barbara; Elhanati, Yuval; Soares, Kevin; Amisaki, Masataka; Dobrin, Anton; Hoyos, David; Guasp, Pablo; Zebboudj, Abderezak; Yu, Rebecca; Chandra, Adrienne Kaya; Waters, Theresa (June 9, 2022). "Neoantigen quality predicts immunoediting in survivors of pancreatic cancer". Nature. 606 (7913): 389–395. Bibcode:2022Natur.606..389L. doi:10.1038/s41586-022-04735-9. ISSN 0028-0836. PMC 9177421. PMID 35589842.
- Moral, John Alec; Leung, Joanne; Rojas, Luis A.; Ruan, Jennifer; Zhao, Julia; Sethna, Zachary; Ramnarain, Anita; Gasmi, Billel; Gururajan, Murali; Redmond, David; Askan, Gokce; Bhanot, Umesh; Elyada, Ela; Park, Youngkyu; Tuveson, David A. (March 5, 2020). "ILC2s amplify PD-1 blockade by activating tissue-specific cancer immunity". Nature. 579 (7797): 130–135. Bibcode:2020Natur.579..130M. doi:10.1038/s41586-020-2015-4. ISSN 0028-0836. PMC 7060130. PMID 32076273.
- Australian Pancreatic Cancer Genome Initiative; Balachandran, Vinod P.; Łuksza, Marta; Zhao, Julia N.; Makarov, Vladimir; Moral, John Alec; Remark, Romain; Herbst, Brian; Askan, Gokce; Bhanot, Umesh; Senbabaoglu, Yasin; Wells, Daniel K.; Cary, Charles Ian Ormsby; Grbovic-Huezo, Olivera; Attiyeh, Marc (2017). "Identification of unique neoantigen qualities in long-term survivors of pancreatic cancer". Nature. 551 (7681): 512–516. Bibcode:2017Natur.551..512B. doi:10.1038/nature24462. ISSN 0028-0836. PMC 6145146. PMID 29132146.
