= Michael J. Weber =

Research Scientist (1943–2021)

- Born: August 23, 1942
- Died: February 11, 2021 (aged 78)
- Occupation: Research Scientist
- Parent(s): F. Palmer Weber, Gertrude Weber

Michael J. Weber (August 23, 1942 – February 11, 2021) was an American research scientist, former director of the University of Virginia Cancer Center and the Weaver Professor of Microbiology, Immunology and Cancer Biology in the University of Virginia School of Medicine. His work focused on understanding cancer cell signaling as a potential target for cancer therapies.

== Biography ==
Born in 1942 to Gertrude and F. Palmer Weber, Michael Weber attended the Bronx High School of Science and Haverford College before receiving a PhD from the University of California, San Diego. He was a professor at the University of Illinois, Urbana-Champaign from 1971 to 1984, then moved to the University of Virginia Cancer Center shortly before it became an NCI-designated Cancer Center. He was a co-discoverer of Mitogen-activated protein kinase, publishing a widely cited paper on the topic in 1989. He also contributed to the development of ibrutinib and venetoclax combination therapy for Non-Hodgkin's lymphoma.

Weber served as Director of the Cancer Center from 2000 until his retirement in 2013, leading the development of the center's clinical space, named in honor of Emily Couric. Even after retirement, he maintained an active lab as Professor Emeritus.

=== Legacy ===
His successor as Cancer Center Director, Thomas P. Loughran Jr., called him the "heart and soul" of the cancer center, and noted that Weber was known for being actively invested in the success of his numerous students, post-doctoral fellows, and employees. The University of Virginia School of Medicine established an annual symposium in Weber's honor. The event brings together international prolific researchers in the field of medicine to discuss and analyze recent advances and findings.

== Published works ==
Weber published more than 250 academic journal articles. His PubMed publication listing includes a posthumous publication on the development of tumor drug resistance.
