= Society for Immunotherapy of Cancer =

U.S. nonprofit organization

Society for Immunotherapy of Cancer (SITC)
- Formation: 1984
- Type: Non-Profit Medical Society
- Headquarters: Milwaukee, Wisconsin
- Official language: English
- Executive Director: Mary Dean, JD, CAE
- President: Patrick Hwu, MD - Moffitt Cancer Center
- Key people: Vice President: Leisha Emens, MD, PHD - UPMC Hillman Cancer Center Secretary/Treasurer: Jedd Wolchok, MD, PhD - Memorial Sloan Kettering Cancer Center Immediate Past President: Mario Sznol, MD - Yale School of Medicine
- Website: www.sitcancer.org

The Society for Immunotherapy of Cancer (SITC), previously known as the International Society for Biological Therapy of Cancer (iSBTc), is a professional society of scientists, academicians, researchers, clinicians, government representatives, and industry leaders from around the world dedicated to improving outcomes in patients with cancer by advancing the science and application of cancer immunotherapy. Currently, SITC has more than 2,400 members, representing 22 medical specialties from 42 countries around the world, who are engaged in the research and treatment of cancer.

The SITC organizes scientific meetings and runs education and outreach activities on cancer immunology and immunotherapy. It also collaborates with similar organizations and patient advocacy groups. According to the society, its goal is to bring together all aspects of cancer immunology and immunotherapy as standard treatments alongside others already established, such as surgery, chemotherapy and radiation therapy.

The goals of SITC are directed towards the rapid dissemination of information in these areas to expedite the safe transfer of both basic and applied research to the clinical setting.

== Activities ==
SITC programs include the Annual Meeting & Pre-Conference Programs, Advances in Cancer Immunotherapy educational series, and an array of collaborative education programs, intended to bring together leaders to discuss the latest developments in cancer immunotherapy and biological therapy, and to focus on and educate the clinical and translational aspects of biologic approaches to cancer treatment.

== Organization ==
=== Membership ===
SITC's membership consists of leaders in the field of cancer immunotherapy and up-and-coming scientists. This group includes research scientists, physician scientists, clinicians, patients, patient advocates, government representatives and industry leaders. In 2018, SITC grew to more than 2,400 members, representing 22 medical specialties and 42 countries around the world and are engaged in research and treatment of cancer.

=== Partnerships and collaborations ===
SITC partners and collaborates with many domestic and international companies, organizations and academic centers around the world, including:

- AIM at Melanoma Foundation
- American Academy of Emergency Medicine
- American Association for Cancer Research
- American Association of Immunologists
- American Cancer Society Cancer Action Network
- American Society for Cell Biology
- American Society for Radiation Oncology
- American Society of Clinical Oncology
- American Society of Gene and Cell Therapy
- American Society of Hematology
- Association of American Cancer Institutes
- Augusta University Medical Center
- Barbara Ann Karmanos Cancer Institute
- Boston University Cancer Center
- Canadian Cancer Immunotherapy Consortium
- Cancer Moonshot Blue Ribbon Panel
- Cancer Research Institute
- Cancer Support Community
- Case Comprehensive Cancer Center
- Chinese American Hematologist Oncologist Network
- Chinese Anti-Cancer Association
- Chinese Immunotherapy Trials Network
- Chinese Society for Immunology
- Chinese Society of Clinical Oncology
- City of Hope Comprehensive Cancer Center
- Cleveland Clinic
- Commission on Cancer
- Community Oncology Alliance
- Dana–Farber Cancer Institute
- Dartmouth Cancer Center
- Department of Biotechnology
- Duke Cancer Institute
- European Cancer Organisation (ECCO)
- European Medicines Agency
- European Society for Medical Oncology
- Federation of Clinical Immunology Societies
- Foundation for the Accreditation of Cellular Therapy
- Fox Chase Cancer Center
- Fred Hutchinson Cancer Research Center
- Georgetown Lombardi Comprehensive Cancer Center
- Health Canada
- Herbert Irving Comprehensive Cancer Center
- Huntsman Cancer Institute
- Indian Council of Medical Research
- Indiana University
- Japan Science and Technology Agency
- Jonsson Comprehensive Cancer Center
- Knight Cancer Institute
- Lung Cancer Alliance
- Masonic Cancer Center
- Mayo Clinic Cancer Center
- Medical College of Wisconsin
- Memorial Sloan Kettering Cancer Center
- Moffitt Cancer Center
- Mount Sinai Health System
- National Brain Tumor Society
- National Cancer Institute
- National Coalition for Cancer Research
- National Heart, Lung, and Blood Institute
- National Institutes of Health (NIH)
- National Pharmaceutical Council
- Ohio State University Comprehensive Cancer Center
- Pancreatic Cancer Action Network
- Paul Ehrlich Institute
- Penn State Hershey Cancer Institute
- Pharmaceuticals and Medical Devices Agency
- Precision Medicine Initiative
- Princess Margaret Cancer Centre
- Prostate Cancer Foundation
- Purdue University
- Research!America
- Robert H. Lurie Comprehensive Cancer Center
- Roswell Park Cancer Institute
- Royal Society of London
- Rutgers Cancer Institute of New Jersey
- Salk Institute for Biological Studies
- Sanford Burnham Prebys Medical Discovery Institute
- Sidney Kimmel Comprehensive Cancer Center
- Sidra Medical and Research Center
- Simmons Comprehensive Cancer Center at University of Texas Southwestern Medical Center
- Siteman Cancer Center
- St. Jude Children's Research Hospital
- Stand Up to Cancer
- Stanford Cancer Institute
- State Food and Drug Administration
- Swiss Institute for Experimental Cancer Research
- Swissmedic
- UAMS Medical Center
- UC Davis Comprehensive Cancer Center
- UC San Diego Moores Cancer Center
- UCSF Helen Diller Family Comprehensive Cancer Center
- UNC Lineberger Comprehensive Cancer Center
- University of California, Irvine Medical Center
- University of Arizona
- University of Chicago Medical Center
- University of Cincinnati Academic Health Center
- University of Colorado Cancer Center
- University of Florida Health Cancer Center
- University of Hawaiʻi
- University of Illinois
- University of Kansas
- University of Maryland Marlene and Stewart Greenebaum Comprehensive Cancer Center
- University of Michigan
- University of Mississippi Medical Center
- University of New Mexico
- University of Vermont Medical Center
- University of Texas Health Science Center
- University of Pennsylvania
- University of Pittsburgh Cancer Institute
- University of Texas MD Anderson Cancer Center
- University of Texas Medical Branch
- University of Virginia Cancer Center
- University of Wisconsin Carbone Cancer Center
- USC Norris Comprehensive Cancer Center
- V Foundation
- Vanderbilt-Ingram Cancer Center
- VCU Massey Cancer Center
- Walter Reed Army Medical Center
- Winship Cancer Institute
- Wistar Institute
- World Immunotherapy Council
- Yale Cancer Center

=== Sponsors ===
SITC's current financial supporters include:

- AbbVie
- Abcam
- ACT for NIH Foundation
- Alkermes
- Allogene Therapeutics
- AmazonSmile
- American Endowment Foundation
- Amgen
- AstraZeneca
- Bristol Myers Squibb
- EMD Serono
- Exelixis
- Genentech
- Genmab
- Incyte
- Kite Pharma
- Mallinckrodt Pharmaceuticals
- Merck & Co.
- NanoString Technologies
- Nektar Therapeutics
- Network for Good
- Regeneron Pharmaceuticals
- Sanofi
- Second Genome
- Standard BioTools

== Publications ==
The Journal for ImmunoTherapy of Cancer (JITC) is the official journal of the Society for Immunotherapy of Cancer (SITC). It is an open access, online journal created by the Society for the many stakeholders in the tumor immunology and cancer immunotherapy community. JITC is an outlet and targeted publication platform dedicated to advancing the science of tumor immunology and cancer immunotherapy.
