= Friedrich Christoph Müller =

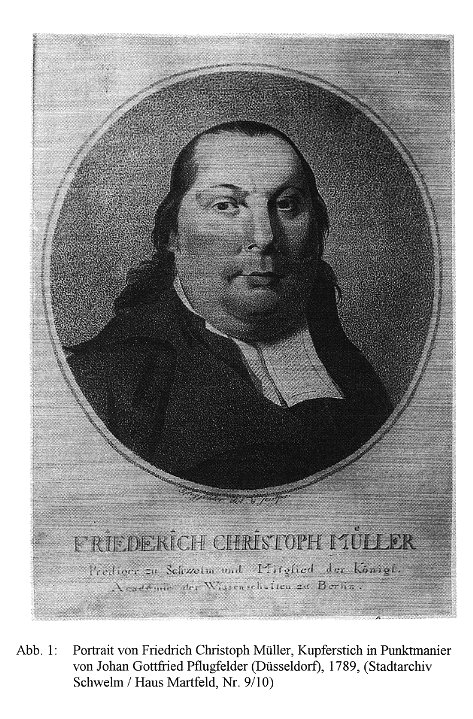
- Portrait etching of Müller

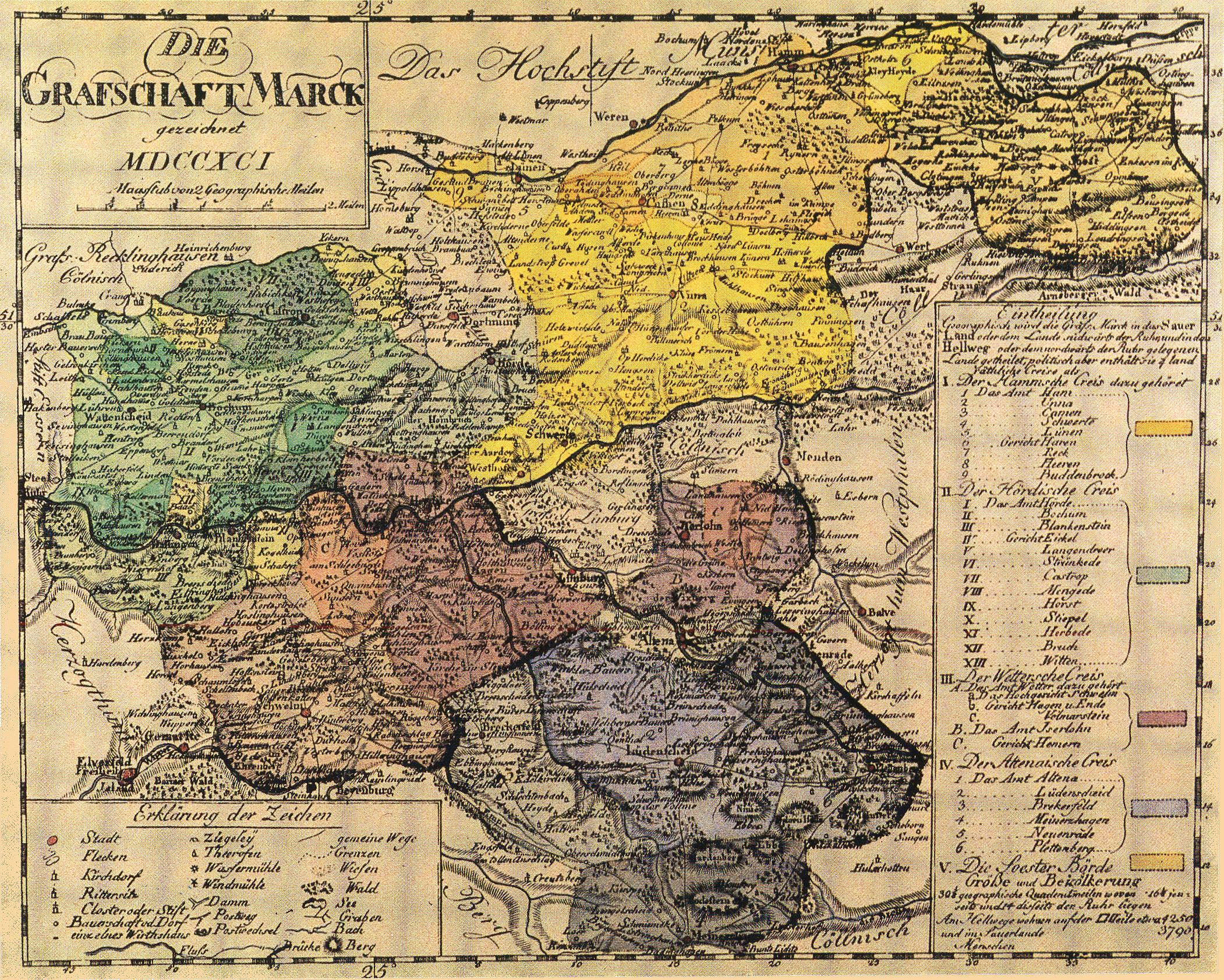
1791 map of the County of Mark

Friedrich Christoph Müller (8 October 1751, Allendorf (Lumda) – 10 April 1808, Schwelm) was a theologian and cartographer in Schwelm.

Mueller studied theology, mathematics, astronomy, and the sciences. In addition, he learned four languages. He was pastor from 1776 in Bad Sassendorf, from 1782 in Unna, and from 1785 in Schwelm.
