= Quorum Club =

Private gentlemen's club in Washington, D.C., U.S.

The Quorum Club was a private gentlemen's club established in the US capital city Washington, D.C. in 1961 by page turned congressional advisor Robert "Bobby" Baker. Its membership comprised Congressmen, lobbyists, Capitol Hill staffers, and other well-connected persons. In 1964 it became a public establishment.

It was originally located in the Carroll Arms Hotel. When the hotel closed in 1965 it was moved to a location in Schott's Court. Then this location was demolished to make room for a Senate Office Building, so the club moved to 3rd Street NE. It continues to operate at this location today, under the name "116 Club".

The club was founded by Baker, requiring annual membership dues, and was used by lawmakers and other influential men to meet for food, drink, and engage in dalliances with women away from the press that were constantly downstairs at the bar in the hotel lobby. In its time the Quorum Club was the setting for the infamous sex scandal between John F. Kennedy and Ellen Rometsch, an alleged East German spy.

== See also ==
- List of gentlemen's clubs in the United States
