= Klenica =

- Village
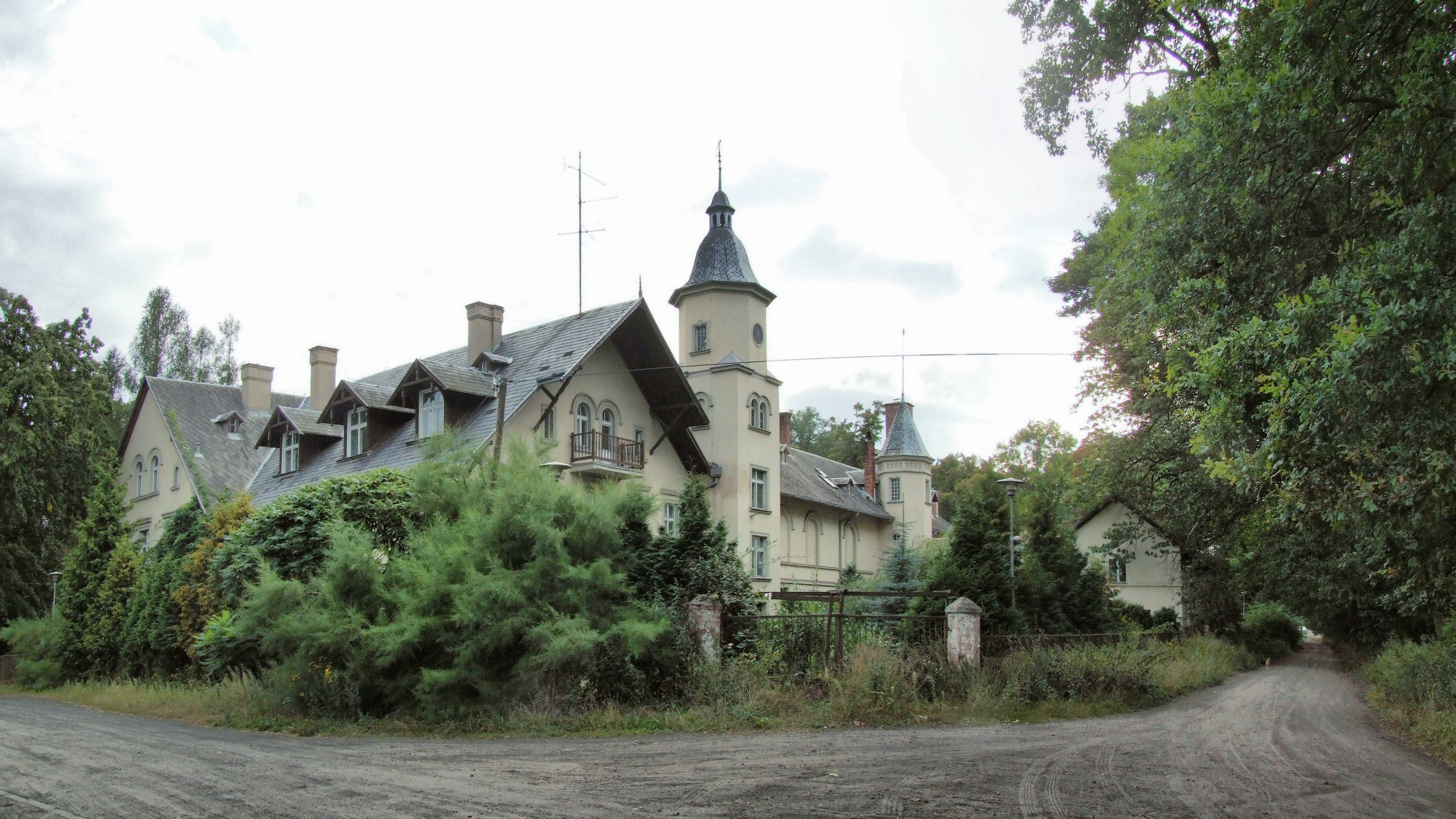
- The Palace in Klenica

- Location within Poland
- Coordinates: 51°59′N 15°47′E
- Country: Poland
- Voivodeship: Lubusz
- County: Zielona Góra
- Gmina: Bojadła
- Population: 1,400
- Website: https://www.klenica.com.pl

Klenica [klɛˈnit͡sa] is a village in the administrative district of Gmina Bojadła, within Zielona Góra County, Lubusz Voivodeship, in western Poland.

The earliest known settlement in the area was in the eighth century. The first written mention of Klenica was in 1424.

In 1787 Peter von Biron, last Duke of Courland, acquired the former Jesuit estate together with the neighbouring Wartenberg and bequested it to his daughter Dorothea in 1800. Klenica later passed to the noble families of Radziwiłł and Czartoryski.

Between 1975 and 1998 the village belonged to the administrative village population of Zielona Gora.

Olga Tokarczuk, Nobel Prize winner for literature for 2018 spent her childhood in Klenica. She attended the local kindergarten and primary school.

== Notable residents ==
- Ellen Rometsch (born 1936), a German model
- Olga Tokarczuk (born 1962), a Polish writer
