= Jedd Wolchok =

American cancer researcher (Born 1965)

Jedd David Wolchok
- Born: January 31, 1965 (age 61)
- Education: New York University (MD, PhD); Princeton University (BS)
- Known for: Development of immunotherapy for melanoma
- Awards: Elected Member of the National Academy of Medicine (2023); David A. Karnofsky Award (2022)
- Scientific career
- Fields: Cancer research
- Workplaces: Memorial Sloan Kettering Cancer Center; Weill Cornell Medicine
- Website: https://weillcornell.org/jedd-d-wolchok-md-phd

Jedd David Wolchok (born January 31, 1965) is an American medical oncologist and cancer researcher specializing in cancer immunotherapy, particularly the treatment of melanoma. He is the Meyer Director of the Sandra and Edward Meyer Cancer Center at Weill Cornell Medicine and a professor of medicine at Weill Cornell Medical College. His research has focused on the development of new immunotherapies, particularly immune checkpoint blockade therapies targeting CTLA-4 and PD-1 in melanoma. He was elected to the National Academy of Medicine in 2023.

== Education and career ==
Wolchok attended Princeton University and subsequently earned medical and graduate degrees from New York University. He completed his medical training at NYU and a fellowship in medical oncology at Memorial Sloan Kettering Cancer Center (MSKCC). Wolchok spent more than two decades at MSKCC, where he became chief of its Immuno-Oncology Service.

In 2022, Wolchok became director of the Meyer Cancer Center at Weill Cornell Medicine. Wolchok is a full member of the Ludwig Institute for Cancer Research.

== Research and impact ==
Wolchok's research contributed to the clinical development of ipilimumab (marketed as Yervoy), a therapeutic monoclonal antibody targeting CTLA-4. He was involved in one of the pivotal phase III clinical trials that helped establish the efficacy of ipilimumab in patients with advanced melanoma and led to its approval. The results of these clinical trials demonstrated that immune checkpoint blockade could produce durable responses and improve patient outcomes, contributing to a fundamental change in the treatment of the disease. He subsequently led early clinical trials and participated in later phase II and phase III trials evaluating the combination of nivolumab (marketed as Opdivo) and ipilimumab, including the pivotal CheckMate 069 (phase II) and CheckMate 067 (phase III) trials. These trials contributed to the approval of the combination for advanced melanoma. In a 10-year follow-up of CheckMate 067 published in 2025, Wolchok and colleagues reported a median overall survival of 71.9 months among patients receiving nivolumab plus ipilimumab, compared with 36.9 months for nivolumab alone and 19.9 months for ipilimumab alone. The authors contrasted these outcomes with the median overall survival of approximately 12 months reported for metastatic melanoma before the advent of immune checkpoint inhibitors.

== Honors and awards ==
- 2010 – Humanitarian Award, Melanoma Research Foundation.
- 2014 – AACR Richard and Hinda Rosenthal Memorial Award.
- 2014 – Giants of Cancer Care Award, Melanoma.
- 2016 – Alfred Taubman Prize for Excellence in Translational Medical Research.
- 2020 – AACR-Joseph H. Burchenal Award for Outstanding Achievement in Clinical Cancer Research.
- 2020 – ESMO Award for Immuno-Oncology, European Society for Medical Oncology.
- 2022 – David A. Karnofsky Award, American Society of Clinical Oncology.
- 2023 – Elected to the National Academy of Medicine.
- 2023 – Elected a Fellow of the American Association for Cancer Research Academy.
- 2024 – Fellow of the Academy of Immuno-Oncology, Society for Immunotherapy of Cancer.
