= David Carliner =

American lawyer (1918–2007)

- Born: Abraham David Carliner; August 13, 1918; Washington, D.C.
- Died: September 19, 2007 (aged 89); Washington, D.C.
- Citizenship: United States
- Education: American University, University of Virginia, National University School of Law
- Occupation: Attorney
- Spouse: Miriam Kalter

David Carliner (August 13, 1918 – September 19, 2007) was an immigration, civil liberties, and civil rights lawyer in Washington, D.C. Among the earliest practitioners of American immigration and naturalization law, he was an early combatant of anti-miscegenation laws, challenged the segregation of public accommodations, and fought for the rights of sexual minorities to enter the country and have full employment rights in the federal government. Carliner was chair of the District of Columbia Home Rule Committee and was responsible for the first modern home rule reforms in 1967. He served as the general counsel of the American Civil Liberties Union (1976–1979); helped to found the ACLU's National Capital Area chapter and Global Rights (then called the International Human Rights Law Group); and served on the boards of the ACLU (1965–1983), the American Jewish Committee (1969–1971), and a variety of other organizations. He was the author of the ACLU's 1977 handbook on immigrants' rights and a coauthor of its 1990 revision.

== Childhood, early career, and family ==
Carliner was the youngest of four children of Leon Carliner, a Jewish immigrant grocer from what is now Belarus, and the former Cassie Brooks, who had immigrated from Kremenchuk (present-day Ukraine). He attended McKinley High School in Washington and was active in leftist politics while still in high school.

He planned to go to George Washington University until his high school principal wrote a letter in retaliation for Carliner leading a protest over a canceled football game and the university rescinded his admission. Instead, Carliner went first to American University and then to the University of Virginia, where he transferred to the law school before obtaining his bachelor's degree. While in college and law school, he continued to be active in left-wing politics against white supremacy and militarism, including organizing students for a statewide Virginia Youth Conference in Charlottesville.

This activity earned him the enmity of the university's dean, Ivey Lewis, and in 1940 he was expelled from the university after he was arrested for passing handbills in "the colored section of town," as the police report had it. Lewis and the university claimed that Carliner had not been expelled—that he had been denied readmission after the summer for using another student's library card—but Carliner briefly became a cause célèbre. He eventually received his LL.B. in 1941 from National University School of Law which, ironically, later merged with the George Washington University Law School.

After his expulsion from university, Carliner was drafted into the Army in 1941, where he was prevented from entering Officer Candidate School because of his left-wing politics; he was discharged in 1945 and spent about a year as an assistant JAG. After his time with the Army, Carliner spent a couple of years with the New Council of American Business, a pro-New Deal organization with close links to Henry Wallace.

In 1944, he married Miriam Kalter, a refugee from Nazi Germany; she worked for the federal government in various programs on poverty and sex discrimination. They had two children, Geoffrey, an economist, and Deborah, an attorney.

Carliner died of a heart attack in Washington, D.C., on September 19, 2007.

== Legal career ==
Throughout his career, Carliner used immigration law to pursue his goals of civil rights. Carliner's first major case was Naim v. Naim. A Chinese sailor named Hay Say Naim had married a white Virginian woman, Ruby Naim, and sought to obtain permanent residency through his marriage. When Ruby sought to annul the marriage on the grounds that Virginia law forbade the interracial marriage to begin with, Carliner tried to take the case all the way to the Supreme Court of the United States. His goal was to extend the recent Brown v. Board of Education, but in fact Brown's proximity worked against him. The US Supreme Court eventually refused to rule, because, as Justice Tom C. Clark said, "one bombshell at a time is enough."

As a result, the Virginia Supreme Court's decision that the state had the right "to regulate the marriage relation so that it shall not have a mongrel breed of citizens" would stand until Loving v. Virginia in 1967.

In the late 1950s, he brought lawsuits contesting Virginia's Public Assemblages Act requiring segregation at public meetings.

Through his association with the American Civil Liberties Union, Carliner was also involved in two major gay rights cases and was an early legal activist for gay rights. He was a leading advocate within the ACLU to treat gay rights as a civil liberties issue. Working with Frank Kameny, he developed a legal strategy that challenged directly the constitutionality of anti-gay discrimination. In Scott v. Macy, Carliner tested this strategy by representing Bruce Scott, who had been fired from a federal government job on the grounds of his having been previously arrested for unspecified "homosexual conduct". Chief Judge David L. Bazelon of the D.C. Circuit Court of Appeals ruled that Scott's "homosexual conduct" was, without further specification, insufficient proof of "immoral conduct". The case did not create a legal right for gay federal workers not to be fired from their jobs, but, wrote The Washington Post, "no federal court has gone so far as this opinion in strongly suggesting that homosexual conduct may not be an absolute disqualification for Government jobs."

Later, Carliner worked with Burt Neuborne on the ACLU's amicus brief in Boutilier v. INS, a case in which the Supreme Court permitted the government to exclude sexual minorities from the United States.

In addition to these cases Carliner represented "World Citizen" Garry Davis; leftist professor Staughton Lynd; Romanian engineer and dissident Nicolae Malaxa; New Orleans mobster Carlos Marcello; a vending machine company against Bobby Baker, a close friend and aide to Lyndon B. Johnson; and the Unification Church. Over a 50-year career, he also represented hundreds of ordinary immigrants in immigration proceedings. He spent his career in Washington, D.C., working in a small firm with a maximum of one or two other partners, including Jack Wasserman (1950–67), Charles Gordon (1974–1984), and Carliner's son-in-law, Robert A. Remes (1984–2003).

== Political activity ==
Although Carliner was primarily an attorney, he sought social and political change in a variety of other ways, including through writing newspaper articles and testifying before congress. Most importantly, he was the chair of the District of Columbia Home Rule Committee from 1966 to 1970. He designed and spearheaded Lyndon Johnson's 1967 Reorganization Plan—called the Carliner Plan at the time—which replaced the three commissioners with an appointed mayor and city council. "Washingtonians owe warm thanks to the long, patient efforts of the Home Rule Committee and its chairman, David Carliner," wrote The Washington Post editorial board.

== Legacy ==
The American Constitution Society honors Carliner's legacy with the annual David Carliner Public Interest Award for young public interest lawyers working in civil rights, civil liberties, immigrant rights, or international human rights. His law firm, Carliner and Remes, P.C., continues to bear his name.

The Carliner Family Papers, comprising the personal and political papers of David and Miriam Carliner, are held by the Martin Luther King Jr. Memorial Library. The Historical Society of the District of Columbia Circuit holds an oral history with Carliner.

During his lifetime, Carliner won the Oliver Wendell Holmes Award (in 1966) from the ACLU and the Immigration Law Lifetime Achievement Award (in 1994) from the Center for Human Rights and Constitutional Law. He was a member of the Cosmos Club.

== See also ==
- F. Palmer Weber, a fellow student activist at the University of Virginia
