= Charles Gordon (lawyer) =

American immigration lawyer

Charles Gordon (October 12, 1905 – April 28, 1999) was an immigration lawyer in Washington, D.C. He worked for the Immigration and Naturalization Service for 35 years, including eight years as its general counsel. Starting in 1959, he began to publish Immigration Law and Procedure, a major reference publication that is still published and updated. In general, he was known as an immigration liberal, who wanted to accept more immigrants into the United States.

Gordon, the son of immigrants, went to college at the City College of New York and law school at New York University Law School. After a few years in private practice, he joined the I.N.S. in 1935, where he stayed until 1974. When he left the government, he worked in private practice with David Carliner and later Ann Bryant. He argued a total of eight cases before the Supreme Court of the United States. He retired in 1993.

Gordon's wife was named Anne (1914-2007), and they had two children, Michael Gordon (1941-2024) and Ellen Gittel Gordon (1944-).
