= Nancy Carole Tyler =

Nancy Carole Tyler (April 9, 1939–May 9, 1965) was a personal secretary to Bobby Baker. Tyler was reported to be a prominent figure in a political scandal involving Baker.

== Biography ==
Tyler won a local beauty pageant in Loudon County, Tennessee prior to attending Middle Tennessee State. During her senior year, she went to Washington, D.C. to seek employment and was hired by Baker.

Tyler and Mary Alice Martin, a former secretary for United States Senator George Smathers, lived in a townhouse purchased by Baker in a cooperative housing development until March 1964. On the purchasing documents, Baker indicated the intended occupants as "M. A. Martin, no relation, and N. C. Tyler, a cousin." On February 26, 1964, Tyler appeared before the United States Senate Committee on Rules and Administration investigating Baker's business and political activities and refused to testify, citing her Fifth Amendment rights.

== Death ==
In May 1965, Tyler was working for Baker while staying at his Carousel Motel in Ocean City, Maryland. On the afternoon of May 9, she died when the single-engine Waco biplane in which she was a passenger crashed into five feet of water 200 yards offshore in the Atlantic Ocean. Baker flew from Washington, D.C. that night and went out in one of the search boats the following day. Divers recovered the wreckage of the plane with the bodies of Tyler and the pilot, Robert H. Davis, the following day under 23 feet of water not far from Baker's motel. She was buried three days later at Lake View Cemetery in Lenoir City, Tennessee. In October, the Civil Aeronautics Board laid responsibility for the accident on Davis, a World War II bomber pilot with 5,700 hours of experience. The CAB specified the cause of the crash as "[a] loss of control caused by the improper execution of a low-level acrobatic maneuver."

In 1978, Baker spoke of Tyler's death to People magazine stating, "It was the greatest emotional crisis I've ever had in my life."
