= AIM at Melanoma Foundation =

Nonprofit melanoma treatment research organization

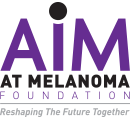
- Founded: 2008
- Founder: Valerie Guild; Jean Schlipmann
- Location(s): 3040 Cutting Blvd. Richmond, CA 94804-2928; 3217 Bob O Link Ct. Plano, TX 75093-6363
- Key people: Valerie Guild; Jean Schlipmann
- Website: www.aimatmelanoma.org

The AIM at Melanoma Foundation (AIM) is a nonprofit organization focused on melanoma research.

AIM was created as a collaboration between the Charlie Guild Foundation and James A. Schlipmann Melanoma Cancer Foundation.

== Activities ==
AIM is a partner of the Society for Immunotherapy of Cancer.

=== Sponsors ===
In the first quarter of 2021, the foundation received a $10,000 grant from Pfizer for a project titled “From the Clinic to the Living Room”. Additional industry sponsors include:

- Alkermes
- Amgen
- BioNTech
- Bristol Myers Squibb
- Genentech
- Genzyme
- Immunocore
- Iovance Biotherapeutics
- Merck
- Myriad Genetics
- Natera
- Novartis
- Pfizer
- Pierre Fabre Group
- Regeneron Pharmaceuticals
- Roche
