= UVA Comprehensive Cancer Center =

Cancer research center in Virginia, U.S.

Coordinates: 38°1′57″N 78°29′57″W

- Established: 1984
- Director: Thomas P. Loughran Jr.
- Location: Charlottesville, Virginia
- Interactive map of UVA Comprehensive Cancer Center
- Website: https://med.virginia.edu/cancer-research/

UVA Comprehensive Cancer Center is a National Cancer Institute-designated Comprehensive Cancer Center affiliated with the University of Virginia School of Medicine and the UVA Health System.

Focused on research and education, UVA Comprehensive Cancer Center has more than 250 member faculty researchers supported by more than $82 million in annual funding. The center also conducts regional outreach to improve awareness of cancer risks and access to screening and treatment.

UVA Comprehensive Cancer Center is one of 58 comprehensive centers designated by the NCI, and the first in Virginia.

== History ==
UVA Comprehensive Cancer Center was founded in 1984 and has been NCI-designated since 1987. This status is reviewed every five years. Its comprehensive designation became effective February 1, 2022.

The center's director, Thomas P. Loughran Jr., discovered and is considered a leading expert in large granular lymphocytic (LGL) leukemia. He succeeded Michael J. Weber, who stepped down in 2013 after twelve years of service.

UVA Comprehensive Cancer Center is funded as a partner in the federal Cancer Moonshot. The initiative is led by the Biden administration and in 2022 set new goals of reducing the cancer death rate by half within 25 years while improving the lives of people with cancer and survivors.

UVA Comprehensive Cancer Center is accredited by the Foundation for the Accreditation of Cellular Therapy (FACT). It is a leader in treatment of myelodysplastic syndrome and an MDS Foundation Center of Excellence.

== Research ==
The UVA Comprehensive Cancer Center's member researchers represent UVA's schools of Medicine, Nursing, Engineering and Applied Science, Education, Data Science, and the College of Arts and Sciences. Its primary research is divided into four collaborative, transdisciplinary programs:

- Cancer Biology
- Molecular Genetics and Epigenetics
- Cancer Therapeutics
- Cancer Prevention and Population Health

The UVA Comprehensive Cancer Center is a leader in research and treatment of rare blood cancers and in research and development of focused ultrasound for cancer treatment. The center is affiliated with the School of Medicine's Focused Ultrasound Cancer Immunotherapy Center.

UVA Comprehensive Cancer Center's research findings include:

- Discovery of the gene responsible for glioblastoma, the deadliest form of brain cancer. UVA researchers also found that the same gene factors in two forms of the childhood cancer rhabdomyosarcoma.
- Identification of a gene contributing to small-cell lung cancer, that when manipulated halted the disease's spread in mice
- Discovery of link between the gut biome and the spread of breast cancer
- Discovery of an inhibitor protein that is inactive in patients with hard-to-treat "triple negative" breast cancer
- Analysis determining that Black and Asian lung cancer patients wait averages of 5 and 11 days longer than white patients for initiation of radiation therapy, respectively
- Discovery of a form of RNA prevalent in prostate cancers that could serve as a target for treatments

UVA Comprehensive Cancer Center operates the LGL Leukemia Registry, the only national database and specimen bank from patients of the disease. It is a member of the Oncology Research Information Exchange Network (ORIEN), a group of 16 institutions, as well as the Cooperative Human Tissue Network and the Applied Proteogenomics Organizational Learning and Outcomes (APOLLO) network.

Patients who receive cancer treatment at UVA can participate in its Partners in Discovery program by consenting to donate tumor tissue from surgeries and information about their health and treatment. Analyses of these specimens and other data is anonymously entered into the nationwide databases to support research, to further the development of personalized medicine, and to expedite access to clinical trials.

== Locations ==
The UVA Comprehensive Cancer Center outpatient treatment is provided at the Emily Couric Clinical Cancer Center (ECCCC) in Charlottesville and at satellite clinics in Albemarle and Augusta counties and in Culpeper, Virginia. The ECCCC is a 150,000 square-foot facility built at a cost of $74 million. It was dedicated in 2011 and named for state senator Emily Couric, who died of pancreatic cancer in 2001.

== Notable people ==
- Thomas P. Loughran Jr.
- Michael J. Weber
