= Schwelm =

- Town
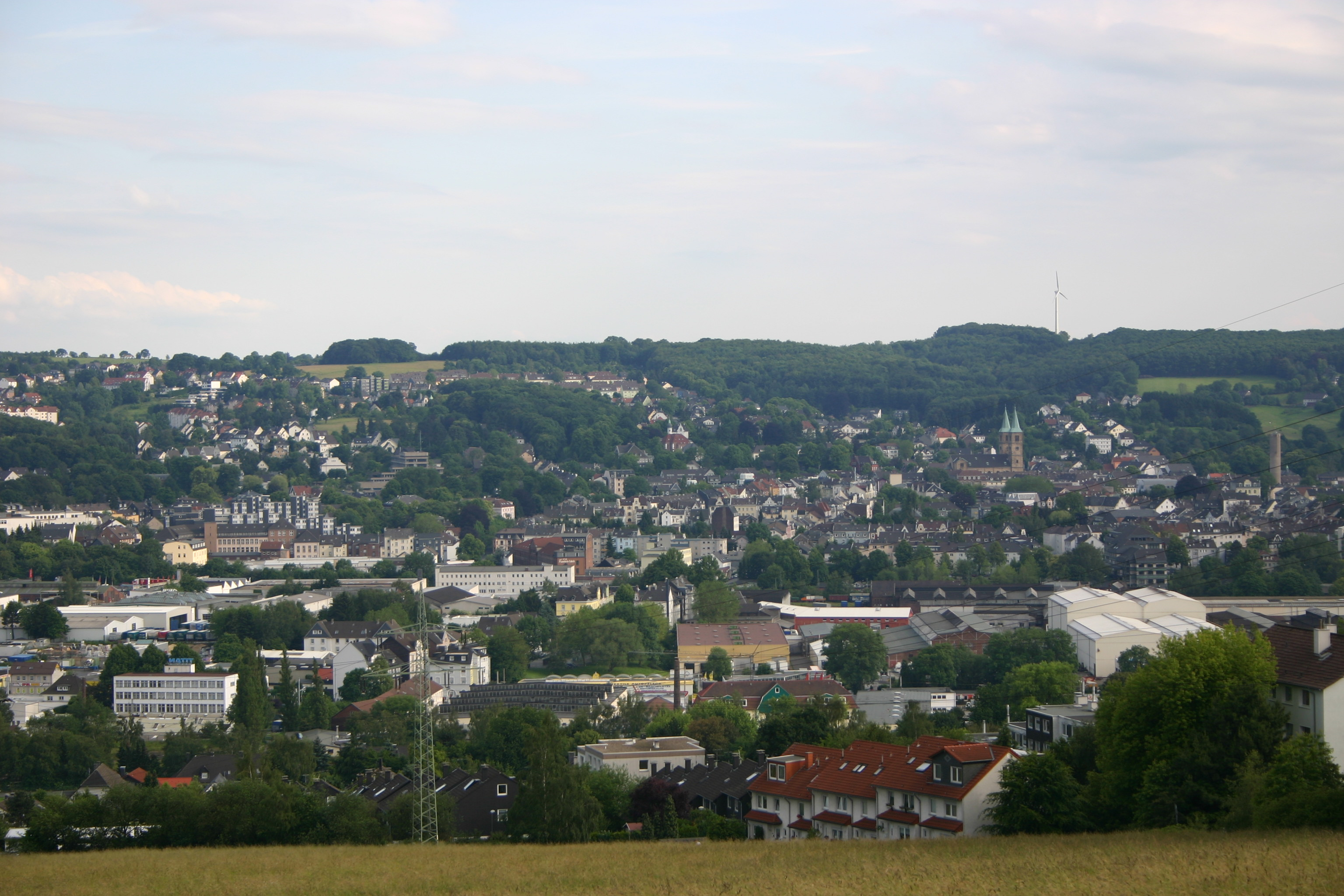

- Flag Coat of arms

- Location of Schwelm within Ennepe-Ruhr-Kreis district
- Interactive map of Schwelm
- Location within Germany Location within North Rhine-Westphalia
- Coordinates: 51°16′N 7°16′E
- Country: Germany
- State: North Rhine-Westphalia
- Admin. region: Arnsberg
- District: Ennepe-Ruhr-Kreis

Government
  - Mayor (2020–25): Stephan Langhard (SPD)

Area
  - Total: 20.5 km^{2} (7.9 sq mi)
- Elevation: 213 m (699 ft)

Population (2025-12-31)
  - Total: 27,880
  - Density: 1,360/km^{2} (3,520/sq mi)
- Time zone: UTC+01:00 (CET)
  - Summer (DST): UTC+02:00 (CEST)
- Postal codes: 58332
- Dialling codes: 02336
- Vehicle registration: EN
- Website: www.schwelm.de

Schwelm (German pronunciation: [ʃvɛlm]) is a town in the district of Ennepe-Ruhr-Kreis in the administrative region of Arnsberg within the state of North Rhine-Westphalia in western Germany.

== Geography ==
Schwelm is situated in the southeast of the "Ruhrgebiet", the Ruhr district of Germany, between Westphalia and the "Bergisches Land". Schwelm is commonly known as the "Pforte Westfalens" ("Gate to Westphalia").

According to its area, Schwelm is the smallest town in North Rhine-Westphalia.

=== Neighbouring places ===
Surrounding towns include Ennepetal, Gevelsberg, Sprockhövel and Wuppertal.

=== Division of the town ===
Schwelm is called the "town of neighbourhoods". It is made up of the following 13 neighbourhoods:

- Aechte de Muer
- Brunnen
- Fronhof
- Linderhausen
- Loh
- Möllenkotten
- Oberstadt
- Oehde
- Ossenkamp
- Parliament
- Rote Wasser
- Winterberg
- Zur alten Post

== History ==
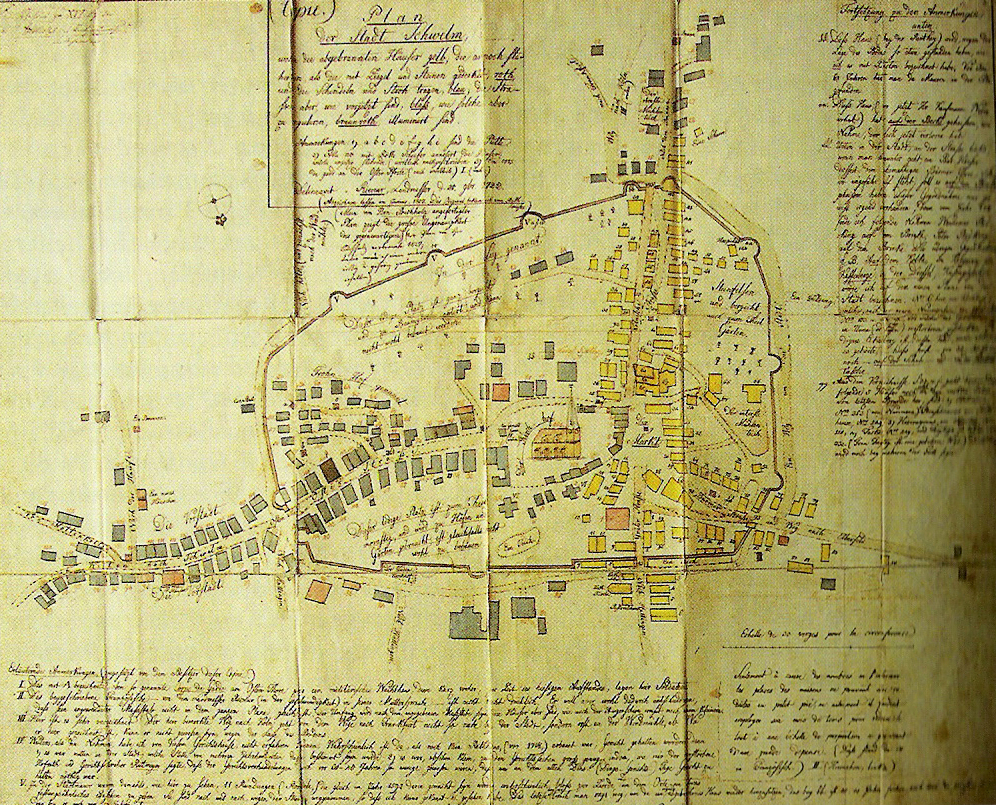
Town map by Johann Ricer, 1722

The history of Schwelm can be traced back to the ninth century, where it is first mentioned as "Suelmiu". The town of Schwelm was officially established in 1496 and became seat of the Ennepe-Ruhr district in 1929.

During World War II, forced laborers of the 3rd SS construction brigade were dispatched in the town by the Nazis in 1943.

== Population ==
Historical population

Year	Pop.	±% p.a.
1965	34,927	—
1970	34,058	−0.50%
1975	31,841	−1.34%
1980	31,107	−0.47%
1985	30,042	−0.69%
1990	30,394	+0.23%
1995	30,729	+0.22%

Year	Pop.	±% p.a.
2000	30,569	−0.10%
2005	29,858	−0.47%
2010	28,614	−0.85%
2015	28,330	−0.20%
2020	28,590	+0.18%
2025	27,880	−0.50%

Source: Landesdatabank Nordrhein-Westfalen

== Language/dialect ==
A Westphalian variety of high German is spoken in Schwelm (Westphalian: from old Saxon Westfal = "western land"). The Westphalian dialect belongs to the low Saxon dialects, which is a part of the family of low German dialects. Compared to other German regions (e.g., Bavaria or Swabia) the dialect does not have a strong influence on the everyday speech. Especially the elderly population is still able to speak Schwelm's original Westphalian tongue, called Schwelmer Platt, which is quite different from standard high German and bears a certain resemblance to Dutch.

== Politics ==
The current mayor of Schwelm is Stephan Langhard of the Social Democratic Party (SPD) since 2020. In the most recent mayoral election on 13 and 27 September 2020, Langhard advanced to the runoff with 41.85% of votes against Philipp Beckmann of the Free Democratic Party (FDP), who won 30.4%. Heinz-Jürgen Lenz, with the endorsement of the CDU and The Greens, placed third with 27.8%. In the runoff, Langhard won with 52.4% of votes.

=== Local council ===
Results of the 2020 city council election.

The Schwelm city council governs the city alongside the Mayor. The most recent city council election was held on 13 September 2020, and the results were as follows:

Party	Votes	%	+/-	Seats	+/-
Social Democratic Party (SPD)	3,302	29.5	▼1.8	14	▲2
Christian Democratic Union (CDU)	2,998	26.8	▼2.7	13	▲2
Alliance 90/The Greens (Grüne)	1,794	16.1	▲7.1	8	▲5
Free Democratic Party (FDP)	1,532	13.7	▲6.9	7	▲3
Schwelmer Voters' Association/Citizens for Schwelm (SWG/BfS)	484	4.3	▼3.7	2	▼1
The Left (Die Linke)	484	4.3	▼1.4	2	±0
Education, Innovation, Future (BIZ)	441	3.9	New	2	New
All for Schwelm (AFS)	145	1.3	New	0	New
Valid votes	11,180	98.5			
Invalid votes	172	1.5			
Total	11,352	100.0		48	▲10
Electorate/voter turnout	22,534	50.4			
Source: City of Schwelm

== Points of interest ==
Schwelm has got a historical town center with many old houses, some of which date back to the 18th century. The Altmarkt is a historical market place lying in front of the tall Christuskirche, the town's principal Protestant church. From the Altmarkt, the decorative street Kölner Strasse leads uphill and is part of the former road to Cologne.

Until 2011, Schwelm was home to the Brauerei Schwelm, the "Schwelm Brewery", one of few remaining private breweries in North Rhine-Westphalia. Established in 1830 by Haarmann & Kathagen, the brewery was one of the first worldwide to switch from wooden to metal storage containers. The original administration building, the Rietz'sche Haus built in 1701, is an appealing house in the town center. Most of the brewery's historic production site, however, was torn down in 2012.

The oldest piano manufacturer in the world is located in Schwelm. Since 1794, Rud. Ibach Sohn has been building pianos and, until 1904, organs in Schwelm.

Europe's biggest fair-trade organisation "GEPA" was founded in Schwelm in the 1970s, but is now located in Wuppertal.

A historical Jewish cemetery, dating from the late 18th century is located in the countryside about 1.3 km south of the town's center. It is maintained by the municipality and volunteers.

== Twin towns – sister cities ==
Schwelm is twinned with:

- Saint-Germain-en-Laye, France (formerly Fourqueux)

== Notable people ==
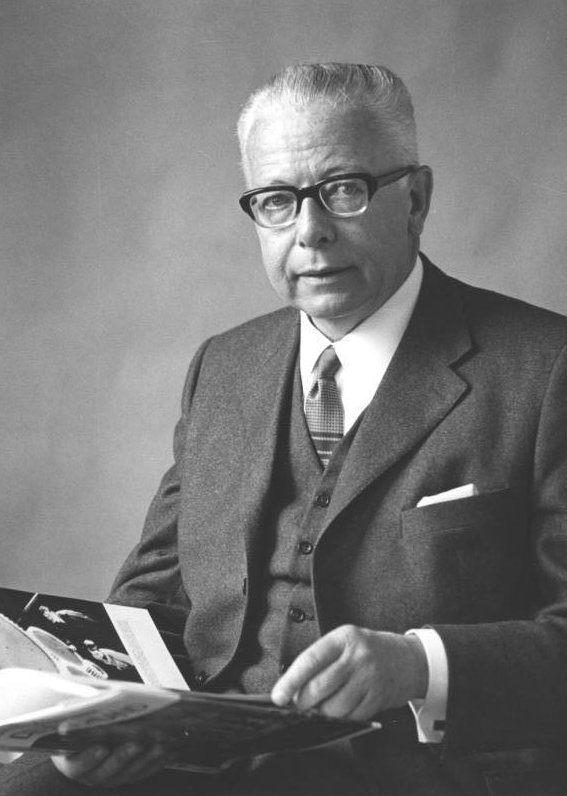
Gustav Heinemann in 1969

- Friedrich Christoph Müller (1751–1808), theologian and cartographer, lived here in 1785–1808
- Friedrich Springorum (1858–1938), engineer and entrepreneur
- Wilhelm Göcke (1898–1944), Nazi SS concentration camp commandant
- Gustav Heinemann (1899–1976), third president of the Federal Republic of Germany from 1969 to 1974
- Johannes Joachim Degenhardt (1926–2002), Cardinal and archbishop of Paderborn
- Franz Josef Degenhardt (1931–2011), political singer-songwriter
- Martin Grötschel (born 1948), mathematician
- Rolf Rüssmann (1950–2009), football player and manager
- Torsten Schmidt (born 1972), racing cyclist
- Olivia Spiker (born 1981), Polish-German amateur boxer

== Gallery ==
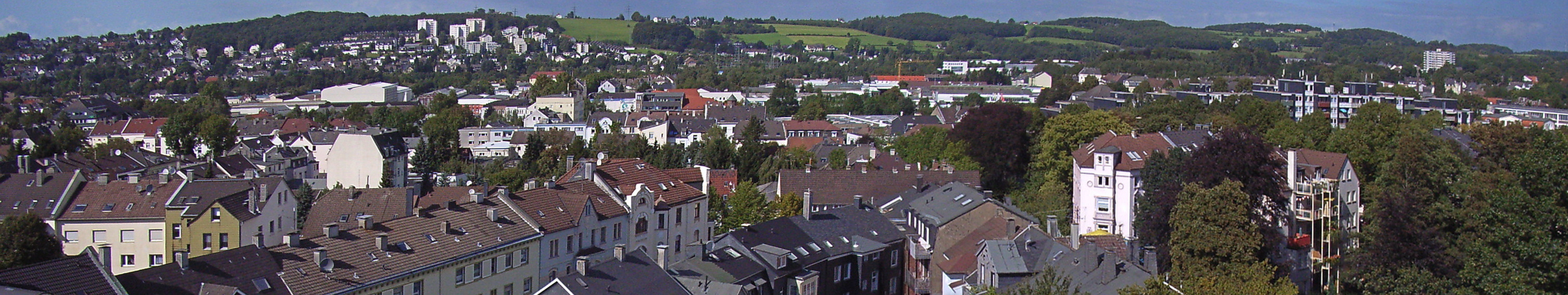
View of the Lindeberg-high ridges of the inner town

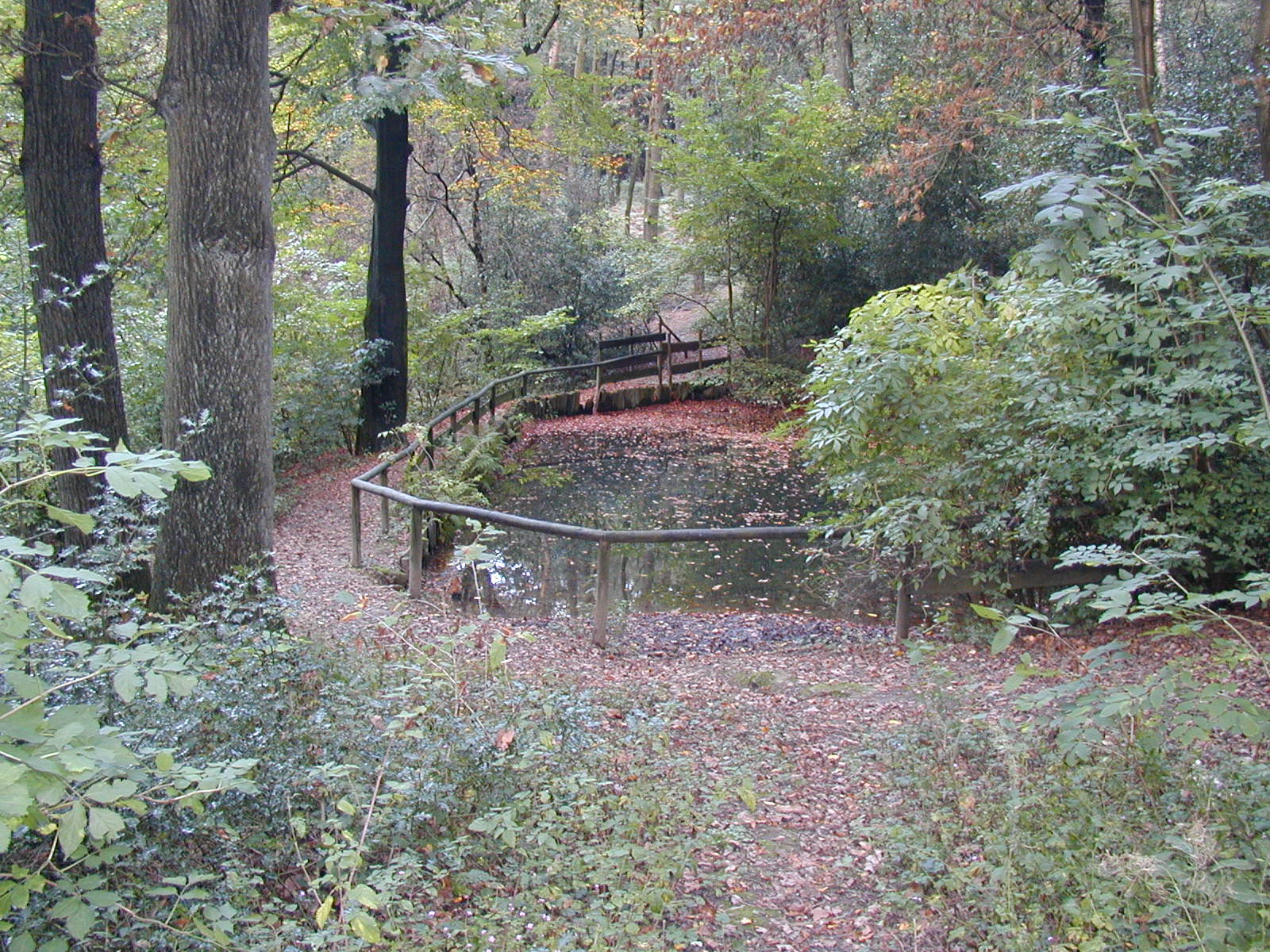
Schwelmequelle

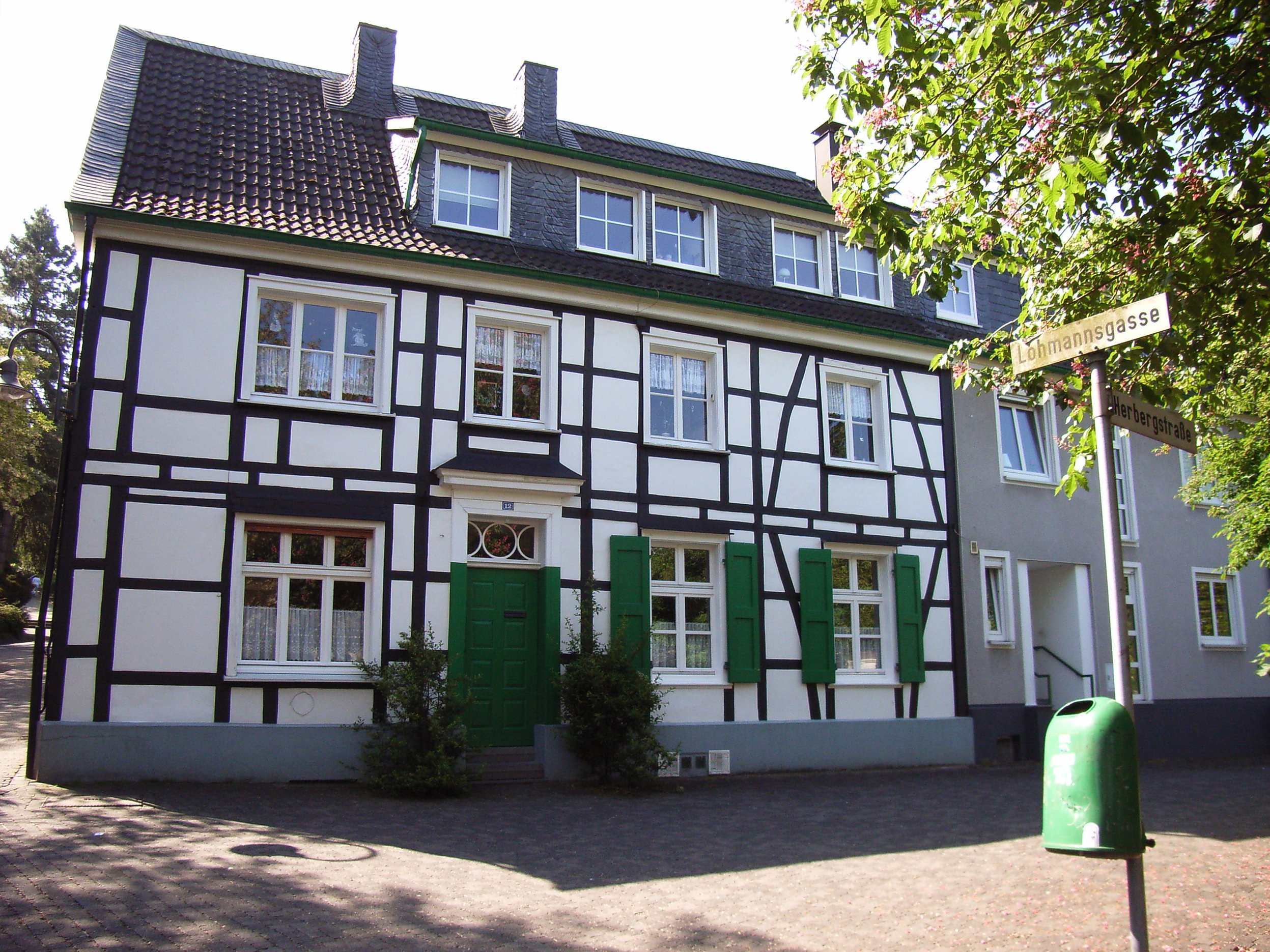
Grade II listed building No. 12

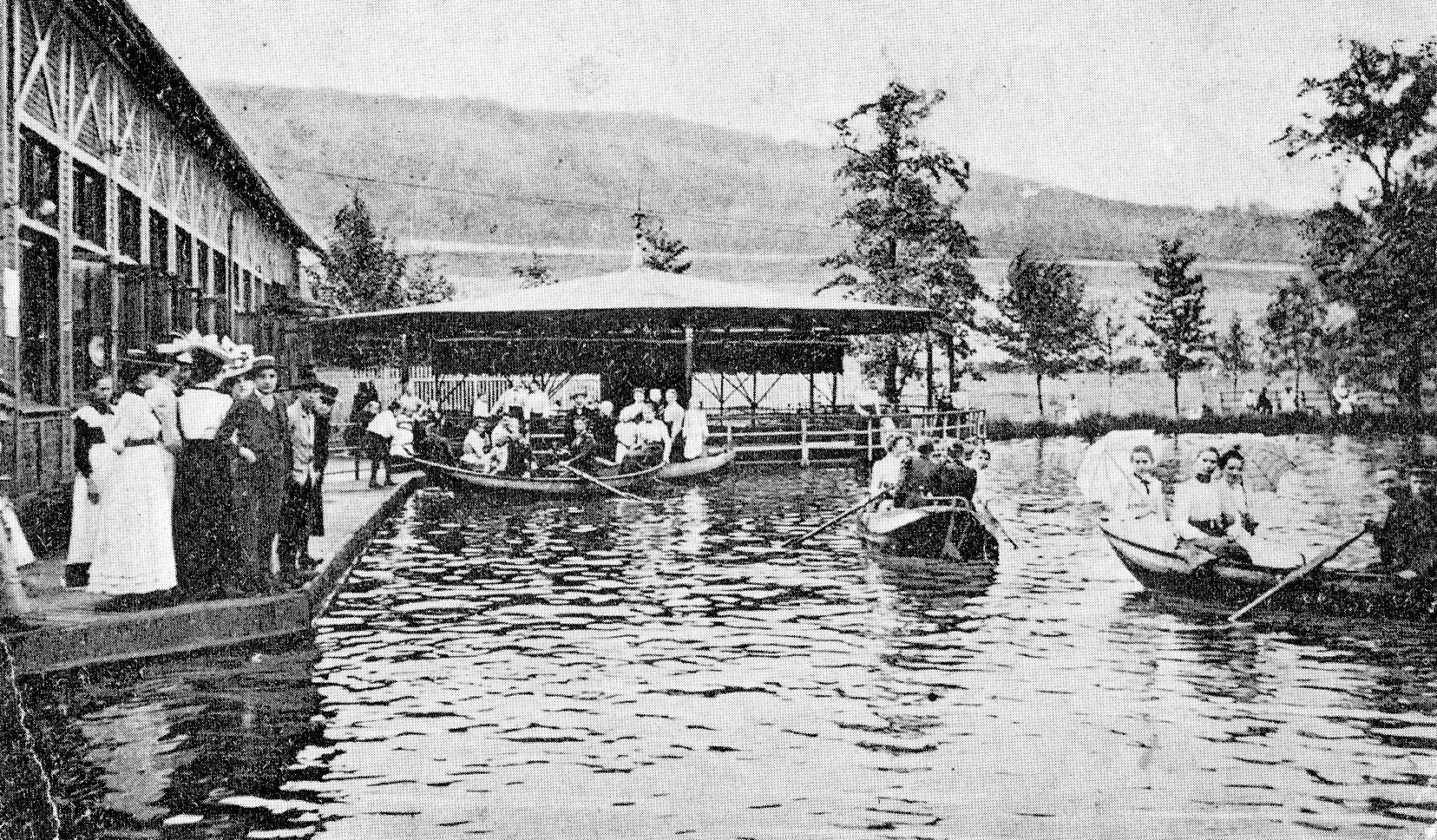
The boating lake excursion restaurant/mill c.1900

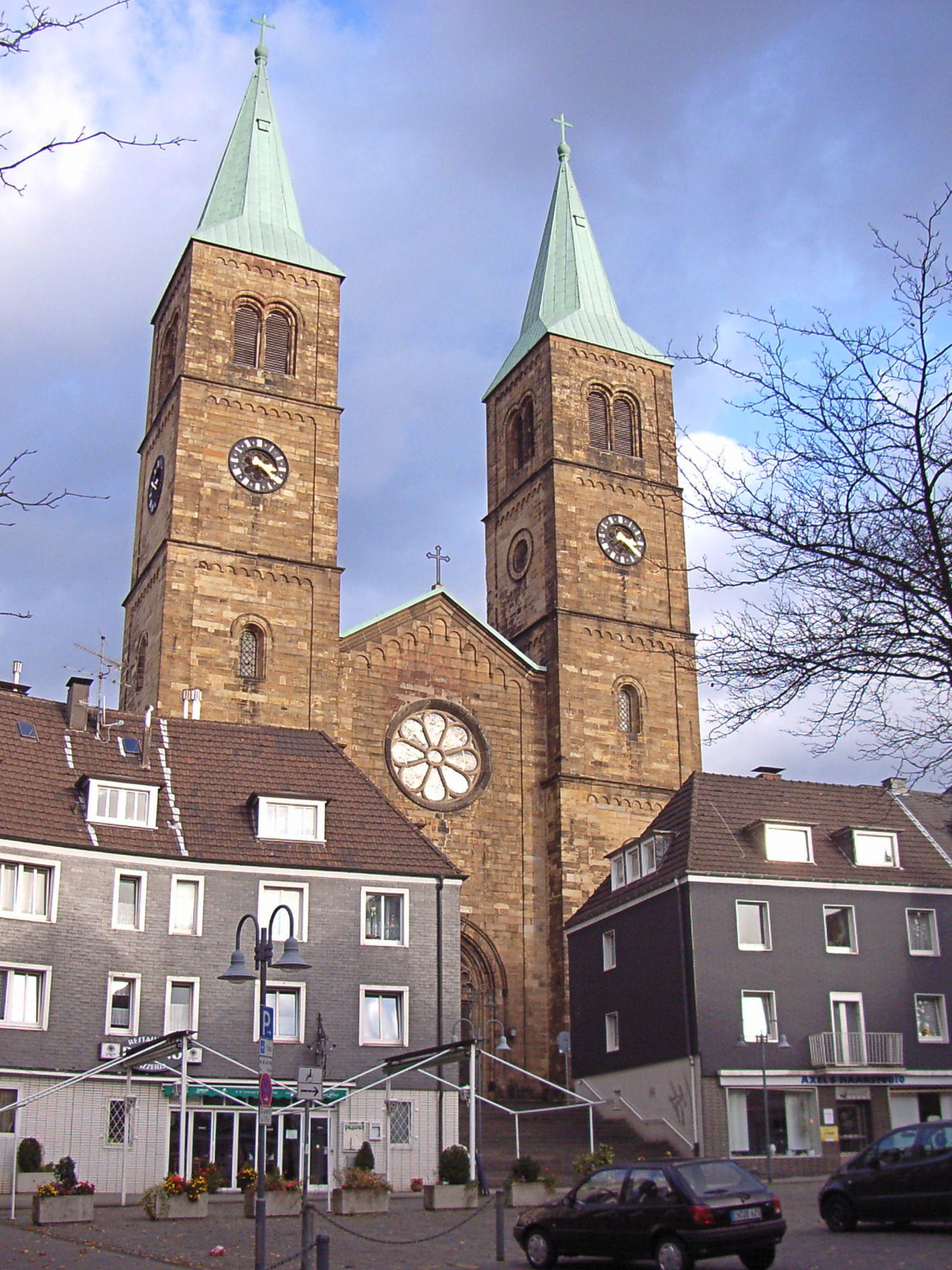
View from the Old Market of the Church

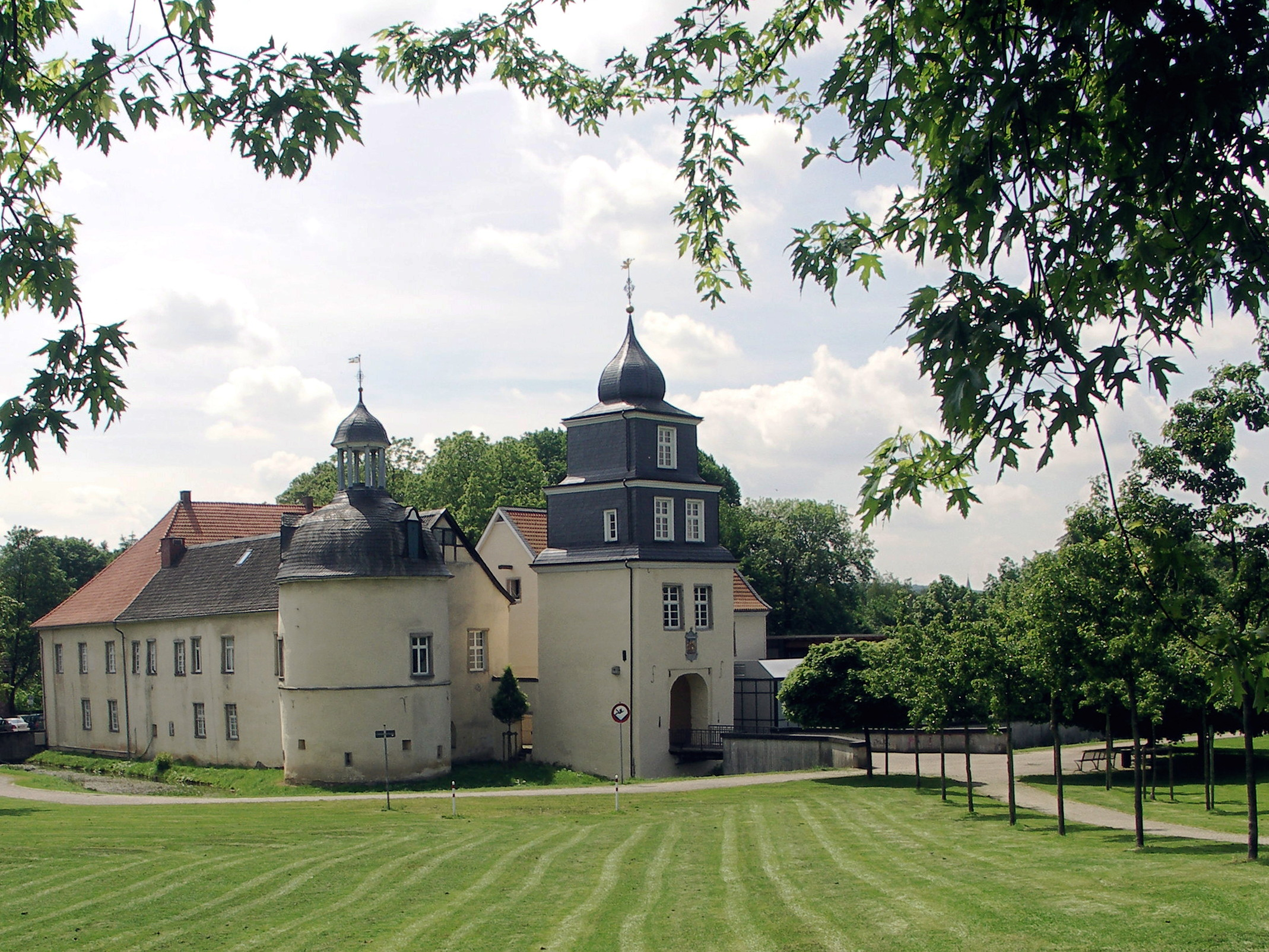
Formerly-moated house Martfeld

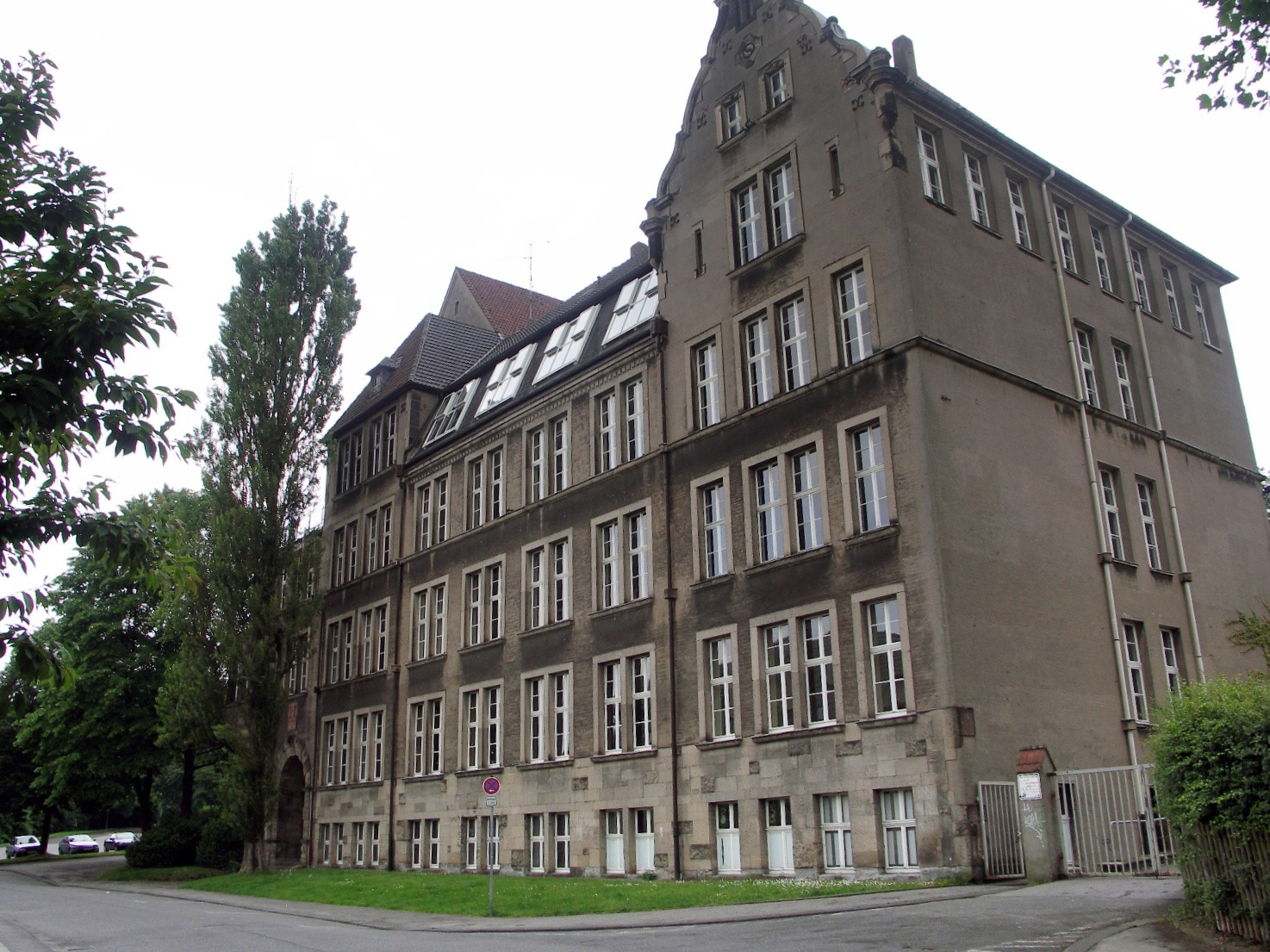
Old high-school in the Märkischer

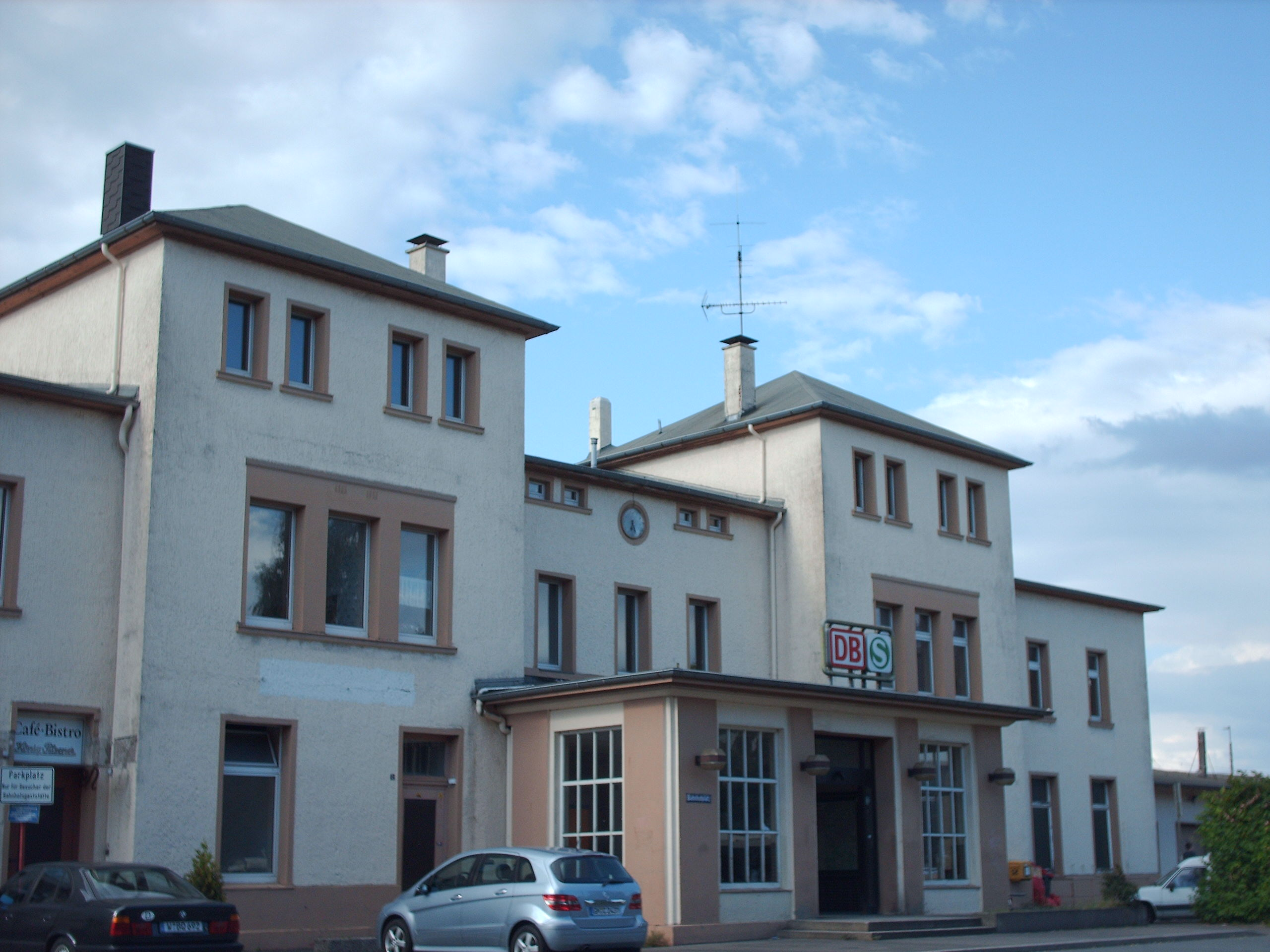
Schwelm train station

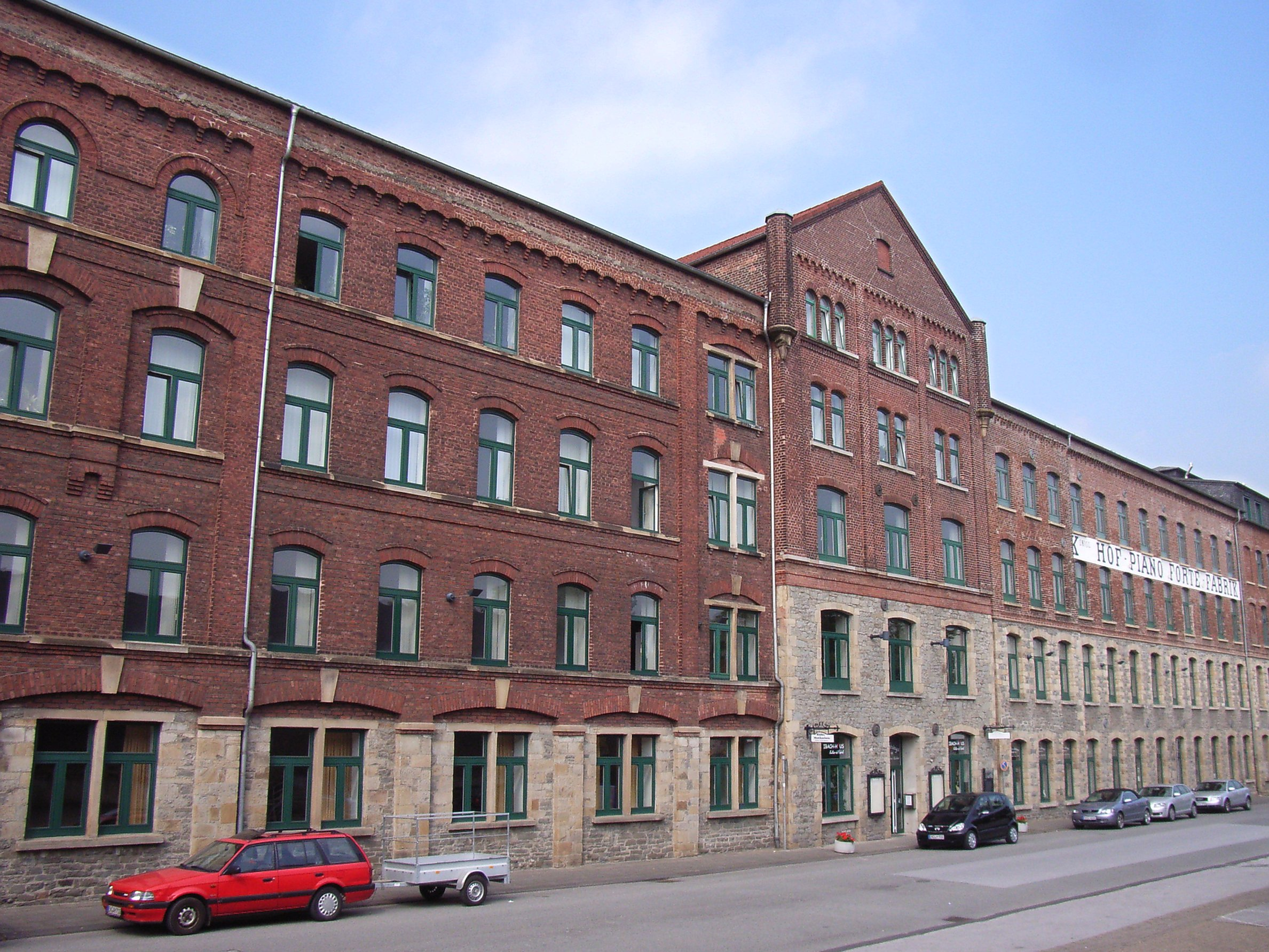
Factory building of piano manufacturer Rud. Ibach

== See also ==
- Cities in North Rhine-Westphalia
