= Thomas P. Loughran Jr. =

American physician-scientist

Thomas P. Loughran, Jr.
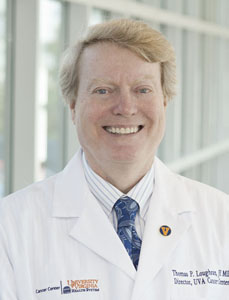
- Education: Hahnemann Medical School
- Occupation: Physician
- Scientific career
- Fields: Cancer; Medicine
- Workplaces: University of Virginia School of Medicine; Penn State Hershey Cancer Institute; University of South Florida; SUNY Health Science Center; Fred Hutchinson Cancer Research Center
- Website: Loughranlab.com

Thomas P. Loughran, Jr. is an American physician-scientist who specializes in cancer research and treatment. He became director of the University of Virginia Cancer Center, F. Palmer Weber-Smithfield Foods Professor of Oncology Research and Professor of Medicine at the University of Virginia on August 15, 2013. Between 2003 and 2013, Loughran served as the founding director of the Penn State Hershey Cancer Institute and professor of medicine at the Penn State College of Medicine. His previous appointments included program leader of hematologic malignancies at the H. Lee Moffitt Cancer Center & Research Institute at the University of South Florida, associate director of the Bone Marrow Transplant Program at SUNY Health Science Center and chief of hematology at the Syracuse Veteran's Affairs Medical Center in Syracuse, New York. Loughran completed his fellowship in medical oncology in 1985 at the Fred Hutchinson Cancer Research Center in Seattle, Washington under direction of Nobel Laureate E. Donnall Thomas. He remained on faculty there for seven years. Loughran earned his medical degree from Hahnemann Medical School in Philadelphia in 1979.

== LGL leukemia research ==
Loughran's primary research interest is large granular lymphocyte leukemia (LGL), a hematologic malignancy he discovered in the mid-1980s. He is considered the international expert on this form of leukemia. He has received continuous federal grant support for the past 26 years and currently is the principal investigator on two R01 grants and a P01 grant from the National Cancer Institute, as well as a translational research grant from the Leukemia & Lymphoma Society. Loughran has published numerous articles in high impact peer-reviewed journals including The New England Journal of Medicine, Annals of Internal Medicine, The Lancet, Journal of Clinical Investigation, Journal of Clinical Oncology, and Blood.

Loughran holds American Board certifications in internal medicine and medical oncology. In his clinical practice, he treats patients with bone marrow disorders and leukemia.
