= Bobby Baker =

American political advisor (1928–2017)

- Born: Robert Gene Baker; November 12, 1928; Pickens, South Carolina, U.S.
- Died: November 12, 2017 (aged 89); St. Augustine, Florida, U.S.
- Political party: Democratic

Robert Gene Baker (November 12, 1928 – November 12, 2017) was an American political adviser to Lyndon B. Johnson, and an organizer for the Democratic Party. He became the Senate's Secretary to the Majority Leader. In 1963, he resigned during an investigation by the Democratic-controlled Senate into his business and political activities. The investigation included allegations of bribery and arranging sexual favors in exchange for Congressional votes and government contracts. The Senate investigation looked into the financial activities of Baker and Lyndon Johnson during the 1950s. The investigation of Lyndon Johnson as part of the Baker investigation was later dropped after President Kennedy's assassination and Johnson's ascension to the presidency.

== Life ==
Baker was born in Pickens, South Carolina, the son of the town postmaster, and lived in a house on Hampton Avenue. He attended Pickens Elementary and Pickens High School, until he was 14 years old, when he received an appointment as a U.S. Senate page, with the help of Harold E. Holder.

In 1942, Baker became a page for Senator Burnet Maybank, and quickly became friends with several important Democrats. When Lyndon Johnson was elected to the Senate in 1948, John Connally took Baker in to introduce him to Senator-elect Johnson. "Johnson jumped up and said, 'Mr. Baker, they tell me you're the smartest son of a bitch over there.' I said, 'Well, whoever told you that lied.' I said, 'I know all of the staff on our side. I know who the drunks are. And I know whose word is good.' He said, 'You're the man I want to know.' So they became great friends. After Senator McFarland became the [Majority] Leader and Senator Johnson the Whip, Johnson talked Senator McFarland into making Baker the assistant Secretary for the Majority." Baker quickly became Johnson's protégé.

Baker was eventually promoted to Secretary to the Majority Leader in 1953, who at the time was a Democrat; this was his highest-ranking official position, and the position from which he would later resign.

Prior to resigning, Baker had been a major power on Capitol Hill. He resigned due to misconduct allegations and a well-publicized scandal involving government contracts. He later served 18 months in prison for tax evasion. In 1978, he coauthored a memoir entitled Wheeling and Dealing, with Larry L. King.

== Scandal ==
Baker frequently mixed politics with personal business. He was a founder and eventual treasurer of the Quorum Club, located in the Carroll Arms Hotel adjacent to the Senate office building. The society was a place for lawmakers and other influential men to meet for networking and illicit carousing away from the press who hung around the hotel lobby. Baker later explained,

"The Quorum Club, of all the things I was involved in, it is the most insignificant thing... It was a place where a guy wanted to get away, you know, from being at the bar downstairs at the Carroll Arms, where there were too many reporters or too many gawkers. It was an easy place for a lobbyist to get together with a Senator, or a Senator's girlfriend. ... I was very close to all the administrative assistants and legislative assistants. I would say 90% were like me. [We] All had girlfriends. And the Quorum Club was a place that you could be met there and nobody would know about it. It was a social club."

A particular encounter involved the president and a socialite,

"One time I was in there and Ellen Rometsch was at my table. She was as pretty as Elizabeth Taylor. She was married to a sergeant in the German Army, but stationed at their embassy in Washington. She was sort of like me. She was ambitious. She'd come from Germany broke."

Baker alleged that one of "President Kennedy's best friends and his wingman, [lobbyist] Bill Thompson was there too, and he came over to me and he said, 'where in the hell did you get this beautiful girl?' And Bill Thompson asked me if she could go have dinner with the President. So I arranged for Ellen Rometsch to go to Bill Thompson's apartment and he took her to the White House on many occasions."

Rometsch was of German origin. As a youth, she had been a Socialist Unity Party member in East Germany before fleeing with her parents and then coming to the United States.

In 1962, Baker established the Serv-U Corporation with his friend, Fred Black. The company was designed to provide vending machines for companies working for programs established under federal grants. Though a part of numerous other deals involving both politics and private financial affairs, this particular business venture would cause a scandal.

In November 1962, electronic microphones ("bugs") in Ed Levinson's office at the Fremont Hotel in Las Vegas picked up references to Baker. The FBI agent notified FBI chief J. Edgar Hoover of the references early in 1963 because, "I thought it was important for Washington to be aware of the possible political influence of Ed Levinson."

Levinson and Benjamin Seigelbaum arranged with an Oklahoma City bank for a $400,000 start-up loan for the Serv-U Corporation to buy equipment and supplies.

The Serv-U Corporation deal became the subject of allegations of conflict of interest and corruption after a disgruntled former government contractor, represented by David Carliner, sued Baker and Black in civil court. That lawsuit eventually generated a great deal of press.

In September 1963, an investigation was begun by the Republican-led Senate Rules Committee into Baker's business and political activities. Baker was investigated for allegations of bribery using money allocated by Congress and arranging sexual favors in exchange for votes and government contracts. Under increasing criticism, Baker resigned as Secretary to the Majority Leader on October 7, 1963.

According to author Evan Thomas, Attorney General Robert F. Kennedy, President Kennedy's younger brother, was able to arrange a deal with J. Edgar Hoover to quell mention of the Rometsch allegations in the Senate investigation of Bobby Baker. Hoover successfully limited the Senate investigation of Baker by threatening to release embarrassing information about senators contained in FBI files. In exchange for this favor, Robert Kennedy assured Hoover that his job as FBI Director was secure. Robert Kennedy also agreed to allow the FBI to proceed with wiretaps that Hoover had requested on Martin Luther King Jr. to try to prove King's close confidants and advisers were communists. Although Kennedy only gave written approval for limited wiretapping of King's phones "on a trial basis, for a month or so", Hoover extended the clearance so his men were "unshackled" to look for evidence in any areas of King's life they deemed worthy.

Even though Lyndon Johnson was not involved in Baker's business dealings after 1960, the Senate investigation looked into their questionable financial activities in the 1950s. This was such a problem for Johnson that there were rumors he would be dropped from the 1964 presidential ticket. After word of the assassination of John F. Kennedy reached Washington on November 22, 1963, the Senate investigation was delayed. Thereafter, any investigation of Lyndon Johnson as part of the Baker investigation was dropped. Baker, however, was convicted of tax evasion and spent 18 months in prison.

In the 1964 presidential election, Republican candidate Senator Barry Goldwater in speeches and campaign materials brought up the Bobby Baker scandal as an issue against Johnson, demanding Johnson bring the issue out into the open.

== Death ==
In 2017, Baker died on his 89th birthday in St. Augustine, Florida.

== General and cited references ==
- Robert A. Caro, Lyndon Johnson: Master of the Senate (2002)
- Robert A. Caro, Lyndon Johnson: Passage of Power (2012)
- Bobby Baker with Larry L. King, Wheeling and Dealing: Confessions of a Capitol Hill Operator (1978)
