= Large granular lymphocytic leukemia =

- Specialty: Hematology, oncology

Large granular lymphocytic (LGL) leukemia is a chronic lymphoproliferative disorder that exhibits an unexplained, chronic (> 6 months) elevation in large granular lymphocytes (LGLs) in the peripheral blood.

It is divided into two main categories: T-cell LGL leukemia (T-LGLL) and natural-killer (NK)-cell LGL leukemia (NK-LGLL). As the name suggests, T-cell large granular lymphocyte leukemia is characterized by involvement of cytotoxic-T cells).

In a study based in the US, the average age of diagnosis was 66.5 years whereas in a French study the median age at diagnosis was 59 years (with an age range of 12–87 years old). In the French study, only 26% of patients were younger than 50 years, which suggests that this disorder is associated with older age at diagnosis. Due to a lack of presenting symptoms, the disorder is likely to be underdiagnosed in the general population.

== Signs and symptoms ==
This disease is known for an indolent clinical course and incidental discovery. The most common physical finding is moderate splenomegaly. B symptoms are seen in a third of cases, and recurrent infections due to anaemia and/or neutropenia are seen in almost half of cases.

Rheumatoid arthritis is commonly observed in people with T-LGLL, leading to a clinical presentation similar to Felty's syndrome. Signs and symptoms of anemia are commonly found, due to the association between T-LGLL and erythroid hypoplasia.

=== Sites of involvement ===
The leukemic cells of T-LGLL can be found in peripheral blood, bone marrow, spleen, and liver. Nodal involvement is rare.

== Cause ==
The postulated cells of origin of T-LGLL leukemia are transformed CD8+ T-cell with clonal rearrangements of β chain T-cell receptor genes for the majority of cases and a CD8- T-cell with clonal rearrangements of γ chain T-cell receptor genes for a minority of cases.

== Diagnosis ==
=== Laboratory findings ===
The requisite lymphocytosis of this disease is typically 2-20 billion/L.

Immunoglobulin derangements, including hypergammaglobulinemia, autoantibodies, and circulating immune complexes, are commonly seen.

=== Peripheral blood ===
The neoplastic lymphocytes seen in this disease are large in size with azurophilic granules that contains proteins involved in cell lysis such as perforin and granzyme B. Flow cytometry is also commonly used.

=== Bone marrow ===
Bone marrow involvement in this disease is often present, but to a variable extent. Bone marrow biopsy is commonly used for diagnosis. The lymphocytic infiltrate is usually interstitial, but a nodular pattern rarely occurs.

=== Immunophenotype ===
The neoplastic cells of this disease display a mature T-cell immunophenotype, with the majority of cases showing a CD4-/CD8+ T-cell subset immunophenotype versus other permutations of those markers. Variable expression of CD11b, CD56, and CD57 are observed. Immunohistochemistry for perforin, TIA-1, and granzyme B are usually positive.

Type	Immunophenotype
Common type (80% of cases)	CD3+, TCRαβ+, CD4-, CD8+
Rare variants	CD3+, TCRαβ+, CD4+, CD8-
Rare variants	CD3+, TCRαβ+, CD4+, CD8+
Rare variants	CD3+, TCRγδ+, CD4 and CD8 variable

=== Genetic findings ===
Clonal rearrangements of the T-cell receptor (TCR) genes are a necessary condition for the diagnosis of this disease. The gene for the β chain of the TCR is found to be rearranged more often than the γ chain. of the TCR.

Current evidence suggests that patients with STAT3 mutations are more likely to respond to methotrexate therapy.

== Treatment ==
First-line treatment is immunosuppressive therapy. A weekly dosage of methotrexate (with or without daily prednisone) may induce partial or complete response in some patients, while others may require cyclosporine or cyclophosphamide.

Alemtuzumab has been investigated for use in the treatment of refractory T-cell large granular lymphocytic leukemia.

Experimental data suggests that treatment with calcitrol (the active form of vitamin D) may be useful in treating T-cell LGL due to its ability to decrease pro-inflammatory cytokines.

== Prognosis ==
The 5 year survival has been noted as 89% in at least one study from France of 201 patients with T-LGL leukemia.

== Epidemiology ==
T-LGLL is a rare form of leukemia, comprising 2-3% of all cases of chronic lymphoproliferative disorders.

== History ==
LGLL was discovered in 1985 by Thomas P. Loughran Jr. while working at Fred Hutchinson Cancer Research Center. Specimens from patients with LGLL are banked at the University of Virginia for research purposes, the only bank for such purposes.
