= Penn State Cancer Institute =

Cancer research center

Coordinates: 40.26459°N 76.67613°W

The Penn State Cancer Institute is a cancer research center of the Penn State Milton S. Hershey Medical Center located in Hershey, Pennsylvania. The Institute provides clinical care, research, education, and community outreach services throughout central and eastern Pennsylvania. It serves approximately 3,000 inpatients and 22,500 outpatients annually.

== Affiliated member institutions ==
The Penn State Cancer Institute currently has affiliations with several other healthcare institutions throughout Pennsylvania, including:

- Mount Nittany Medical Center in State College, Pennsylvania
- St. Joseph Medical Center in Reading, Pennsylvania
- Lewistown Hospital in Lewistown, Pennsylvania
- Wyoming Valley Health Care System in the Wilkes-Barre/Scranton, Pennsylvania area
- Susquehanna Health System in Williamsport, Pennsylvania
- Andrews-Patel Hematology/Oncology in Harrisburg and Camp Hill, Pennsylvania

== Leadership ==
The Penn State Cancer Institute is led by Dr. Raymond J. Hohl, who joined in 2014 from the University of Iowa.

== About the Penn State Hershey Cancer Institute ==
In July 2009, Penn State Hershey Cancer Institute opened the doors to its new state-of-the-art, 178,000-square-foot (16,500 m^{2}) freestanding building located on the Penn State Milton S. Hershey Medical Center campus. The region's only comprehensive cancer center offers access to internationally recognized cancer specialists and scientists delivering a multidisciplinary approach to cancer care, patient-friendly facilities, and up-to-date medical technology. The facility helps position the Cancer Institute to earn a National Cancer Institute designation–the hallmark accreditation for academic cancer centers. The new facility is intended to integrate research and care with the educational mission of the Medical Center, and includes clinical space, laboratories, radiation and chemotherapy facilities, and administrative offices. Researchers and caregivers will be more closely connected, and will have the resources for strategic partnerships with scientists at Penn State's other campuses. To complement funding through federal and state grants, borrowing, and Medical Center reserves, the Cancer Institute is seeking to raise $65 million in philanthropy.

- The catchment area includes 27 counties, many of them medically underserved. The Cancer Institute is a regional coordinator for the 13-county South Central Pennsylvania Cancer Education Network as selected by the Pennsylvania Department of Health. The Institute provides cancer screening to medically underserved, at-risk individuals; increases cancer knowledge and awareness of health intervention participants; and facilitates community changes that support a healthy environment.
- The Cancer Institute was first in the region to offer RapidArc™ radiotherapy technology, a breakthrough in radiation treatment.
- The Cancer Institute is a Blue Distinction Center for Complex and Rare Cancers by Highmark Blue Shield. This designation identifies the institute as a facility within Highmark's service area that offers comprehensive inpatient cancer care programs for adults delivered by multidisciplinary teams with subspecialty training, and distinguished clinical expertise in treating complex and rare subtypes of cancer.

== See also ==
- Association of American Cancer Institutes
