= Pennsylvania State Memorial, Gettysburg =

Gettysburg Battlefield monument

Pennsylvania State Memorial
- Pennsylvania Monument
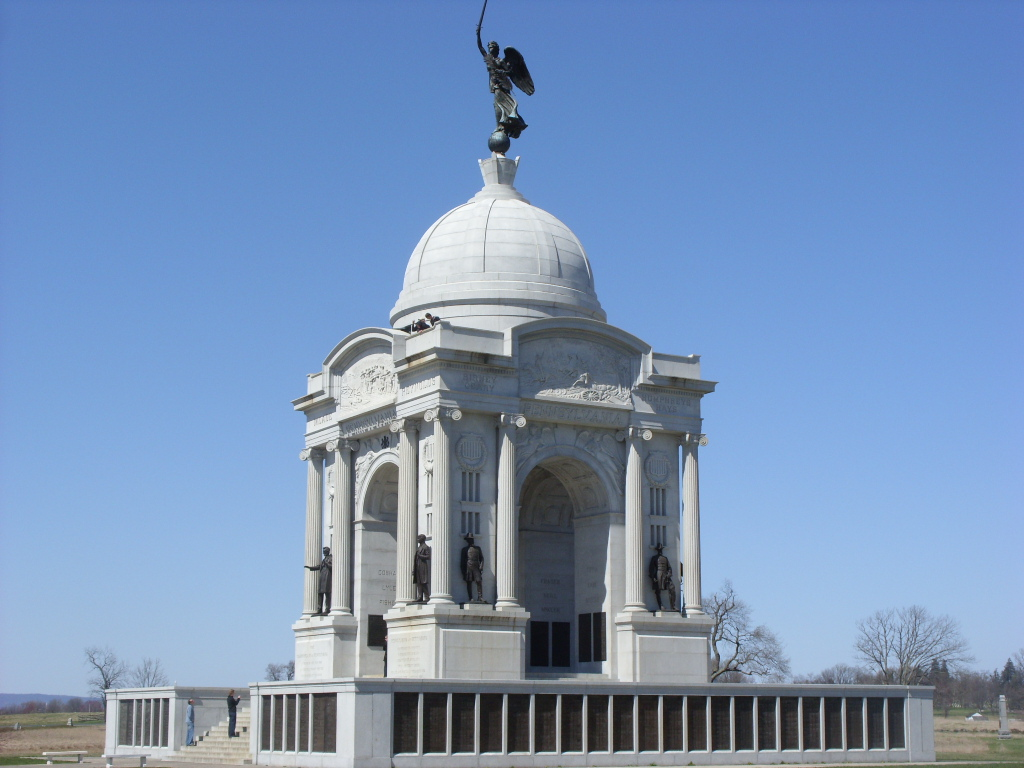
- Interactive map of Pennsylvania State Memorial
- Location: Gettysburg National Military Park
- Coordinates: 39°48′28″N 77°14′07″W
- Designer: W. Liance Cottrell (Architect); Samuel Murray (Sculptor)
- Completion date: 1914
- Opening date: September 27, 1910

The Pennsylvania State Memorial is a monument in Gettysburg National Military Park that commemorates the 34,530 Pennsylvania soldiers who fought in the July 1 to 3, 1863 Battle of Gettysburg during the American Civil War. The memorial stands along Cemetery Ridge, the Union battle line on July 2, 1863. Completed in 1914, it is the largest of the state monuments on the Gettysburg Battlefield.

== History ==
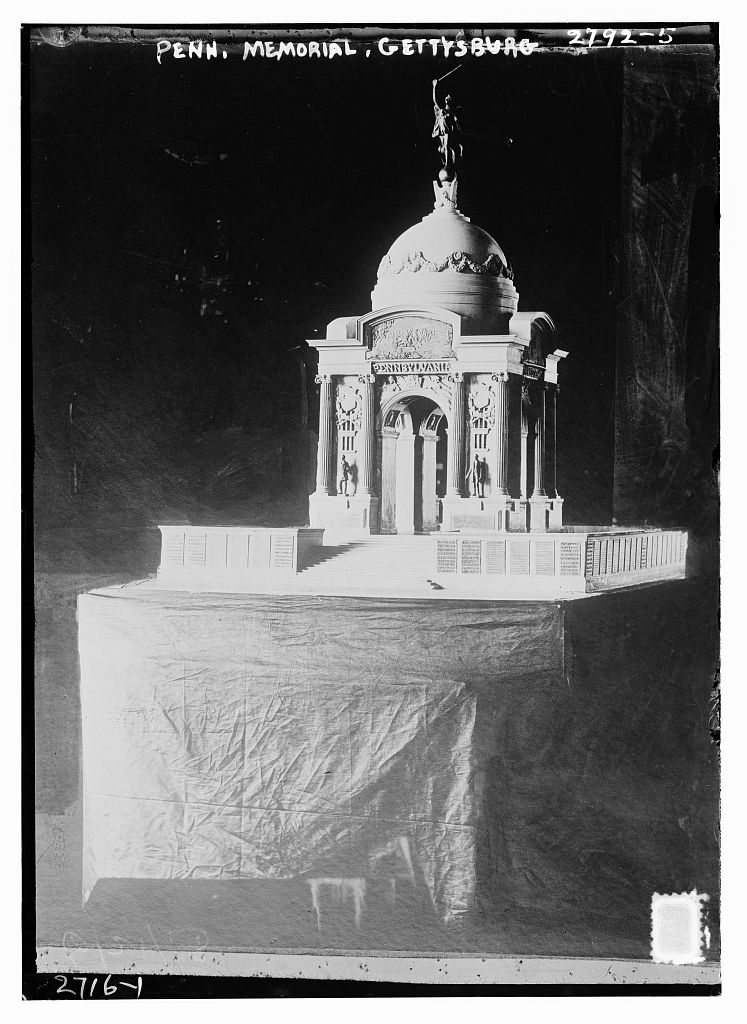
Cottrell & Murray's plaster model, circa 1909.

In the 1880s, Congressman Andrew G. Curtin, who had served as Pennsylvania's governor during the Civil War, advocated for a "Pennsylvania Memorial Hall" to be built atop Little Round Top. The 60 ft (18 m)-square hall would display "a treasury of trophies and mementos of all the Pennsylvania regiments that fought at Gettysburg." The proposed building was included in an 1889 state appropriations bill, that was vetoed by Governor James A. Beaver.

Eighteen years later, the Pennsylvania Legislature appropriated $150,000 for construction of a state memorial, and the current site was announced in February 1909. The design competition for the commission was won by the entry of New York architect W. Liance Cottrell and Philadelphia sculptor Samuel Murray. The building was to be completed by July 1, 1910.

Humphreys Avenue, along the east side of the memorial, was not surveyed until 1911, so materials were delivered by railroad, via the Round Top Branch to nearby Hancock Station.

The memorial was unfinished when it was dedicated on September 27, 1910, and the project was out of money. An additional state appropriation of $40,000 was approved in 1911. The new completion date was set for July 1, 1913 – the 50th anniversary of the battle. The portrait statues were installed in April 1913, and the memorial was rededicated on July 4, 1913. A bronze tablet listing the names of 945 additional Pennsylvania veterans completed the memorial in 1914.

== Description ==
The memorial features a square, granite pedestal (terrace) – 100 feet on each side – with bronze tablets on its exterior face that list the names of the 34,530 Pennsylvania soldiers who fought in the battle. Set upon the pedestal is the granite pavilion, which consists of 4 corner towers linked by arches that form an arcus quadrifrons, or 4-sided triumphal arch. Engaged Ionic columns at the corners and flanking the arches form niches for the 8 portrait statues. The pavilion is topped by a granite dome. Between the parapet and the dome's base is an observation deck, accessed by a spiral staircase in the northwest corner tower. Under the pavilion is an undercroft or vaulted cellar. The memorial's entrance is on the west (Hancock Avenue) side, where a wide flight of steps rises to the pedestal's terrace. Half-flights rise beneath each arch into the pavilion's central hall.

A bronze Nike figure, the Goddess of Victory and Peace, crowns the podium atop the dome. She holds a sword in one hand and a palm branch, a symbol of victory through peace, in the other. In a gesture to the Biblical passage "they shall beat their swords into plowshares," the bronze used to cast the Nike came from melted-down cannons. Above the arches are spandrel bas-reliefs of winged goddesses, and above the cornice is a parapet with a bas-relief panel on each side that depicts the Artillery, Cavalry, Infantry and Signal Corps. Larger-than-life bronze statues of President Abraham Lincoln and other prominent Civil War figures flank the arches. Above them are bas-relief shields and laurel wreaths. The names of important figures in the battle are inscribed across the pavilion's frieze and on its interior.

== Sculpture ==
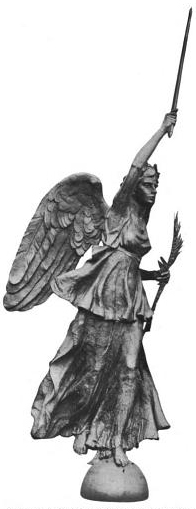
Goddess of Victory and Peace by Samuel Murray.

- Goddess of Victory and Peace (1909–10) by Samuel Murray, atop the monument's dome. Height: 21 ft (6.4 m). Weight: 7,500 lb (3,402 kg).
- Portrait statues:
  - President Abraham Lincoln (1911–1913) by J. Otto Schweizer, west side
  - Governor Andrew Curtin (1911–1913) by William Clark Noble, west side
  - General George Meade (1911–1913) by Lee Lawrie, north side
  - General John F. Reynolds (1911–1913) by Lee Lawrie, north side
  - General Winfield Scott Hancock (1911–1913) by Cyrus Edwin Dallin, south side
  - General David McMurtrie Gregg (1911–1913) by J. Otto Schweizer, east side
  - General Alfred Pleasonton (1911–1913) by J. Otto Schweizer, south side
  - General David B. Birney (1911–1913) by Lee Lawrie, south side
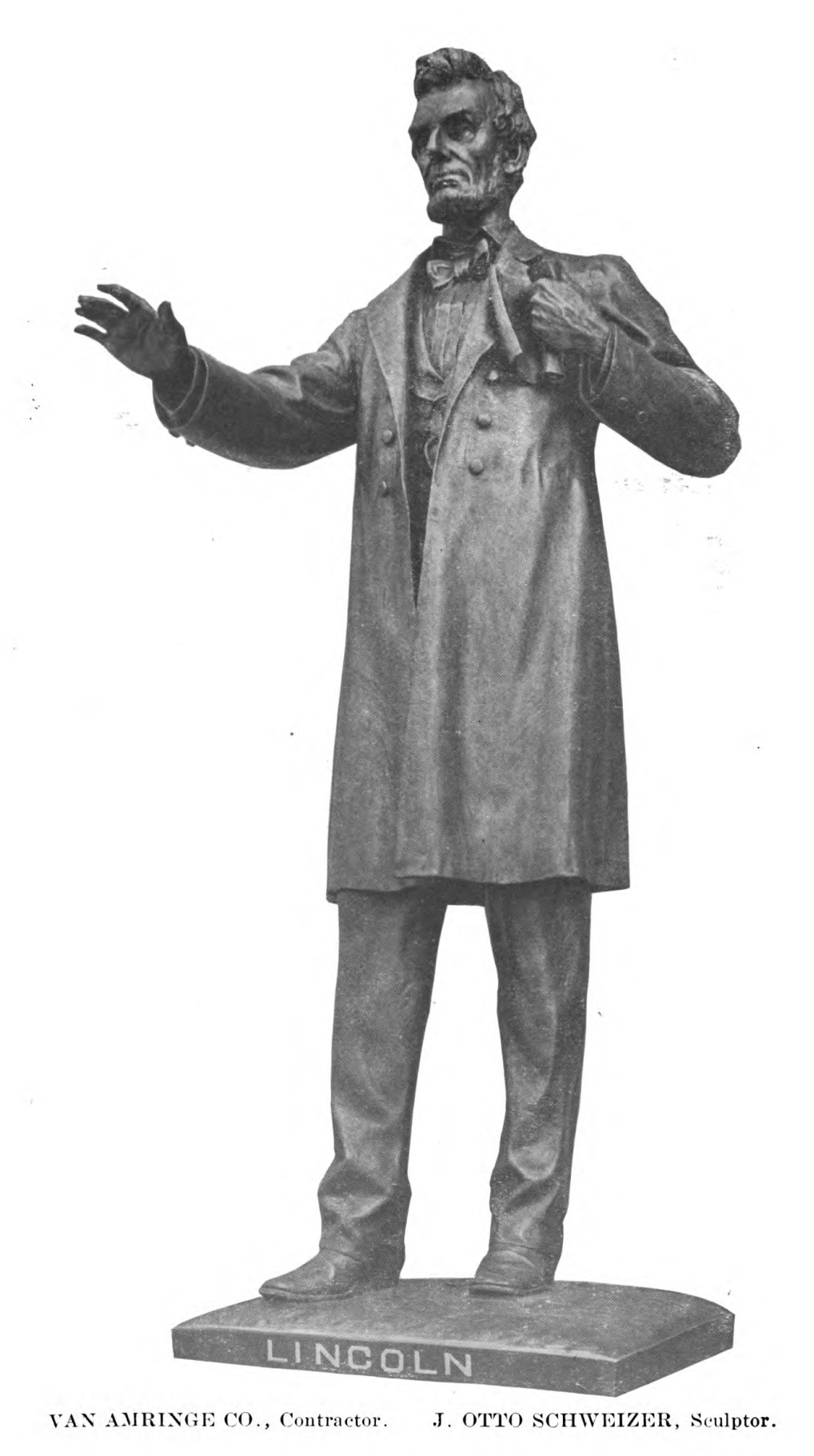
Abraham Lincoln by J. Otto Schweizer

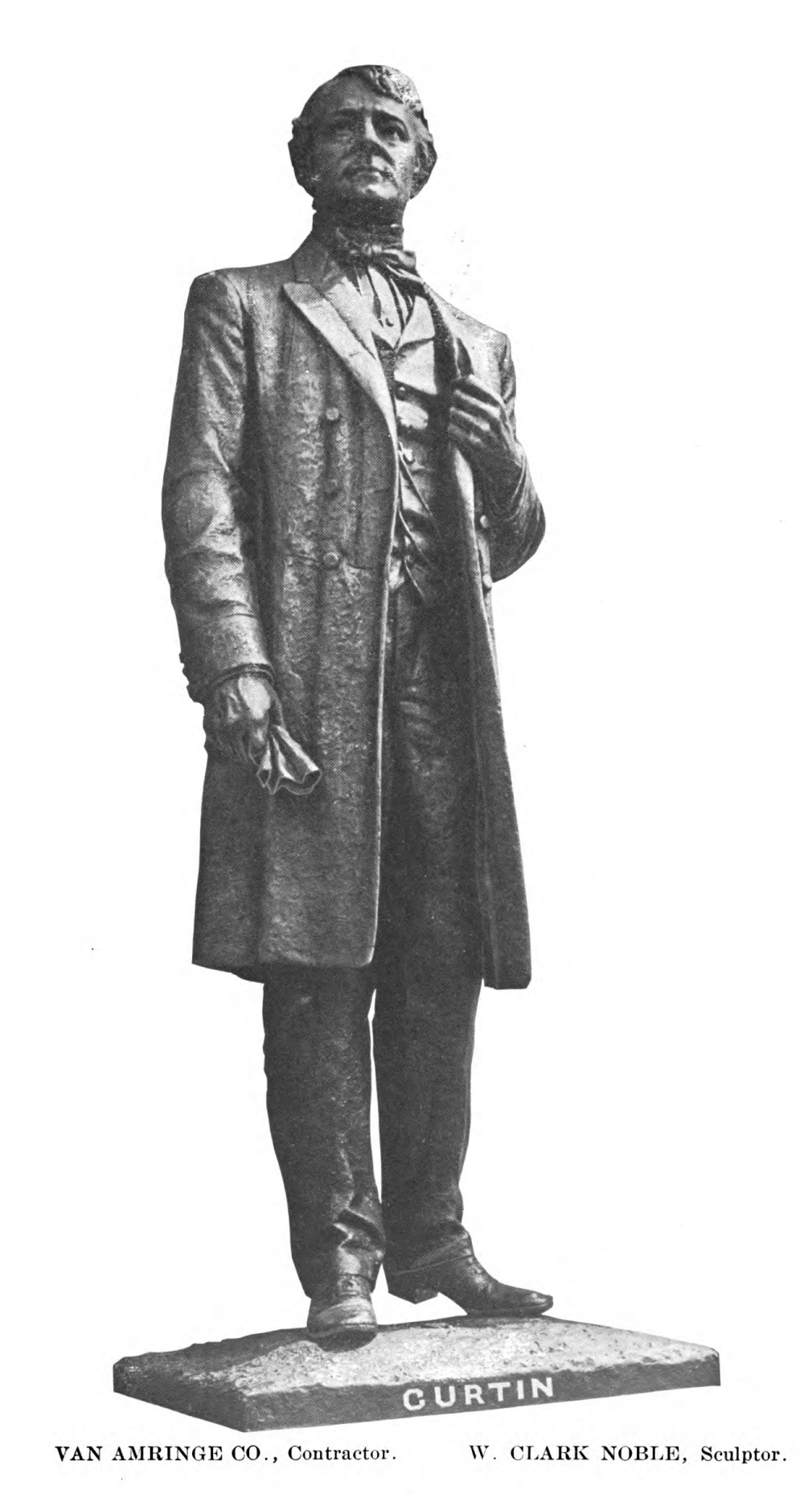
Gov. Andrew Curtin by William Clark Noble

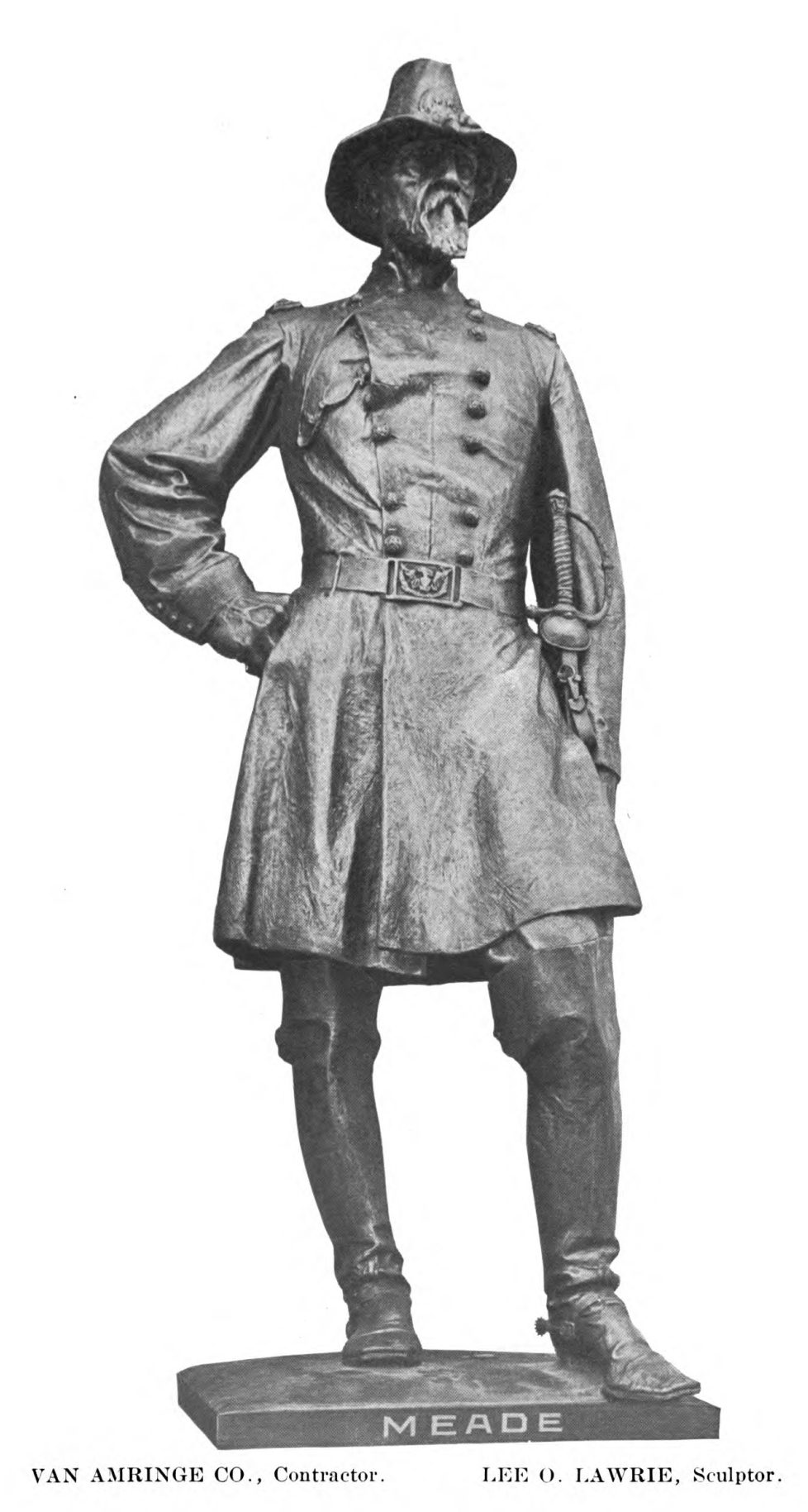
Gen. George Meade by Lee Lawrie

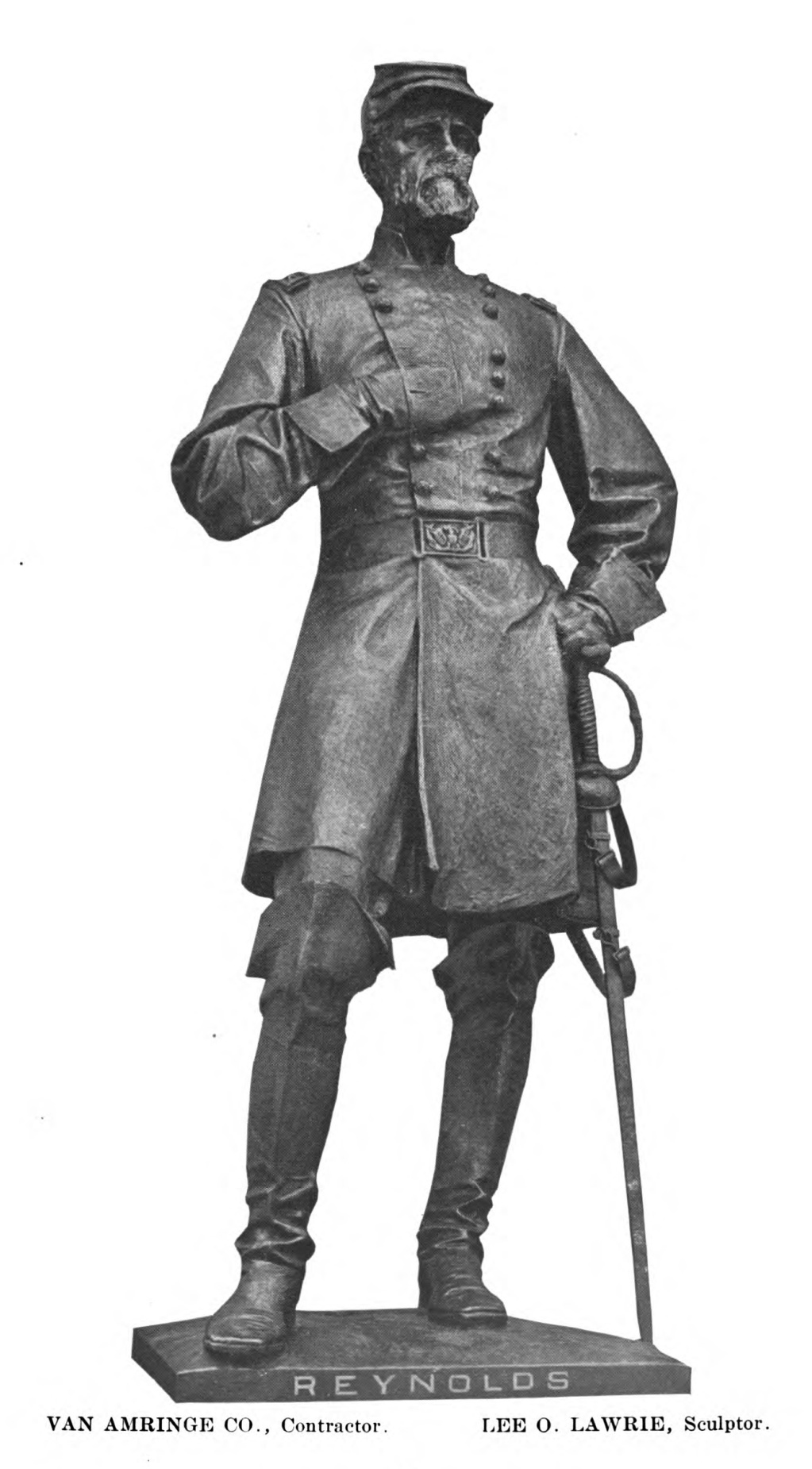
Gen. John F. Reynolds by Lee Lawrie

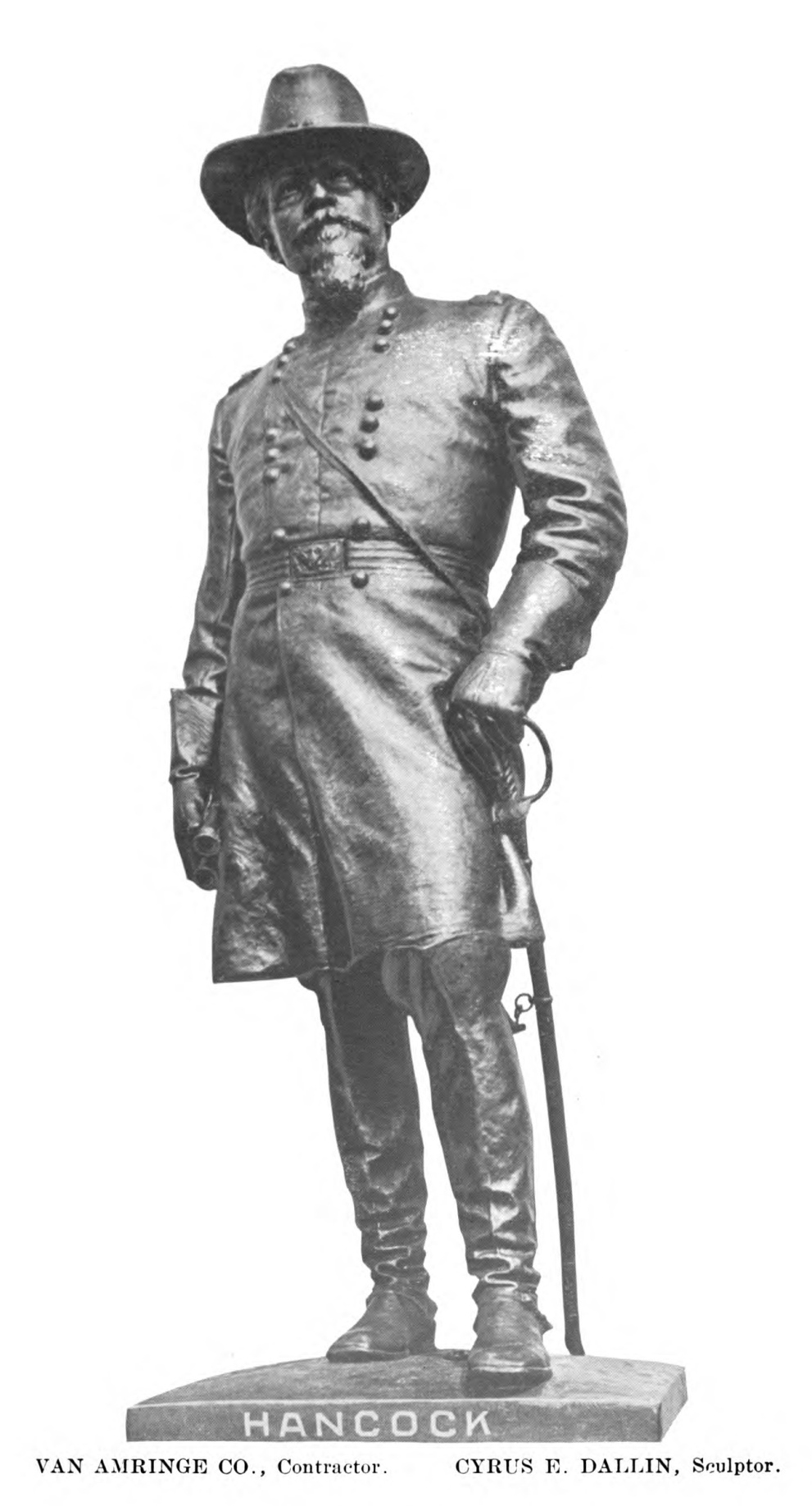
General Winfield Scott Hancock by Cyrus Edwin Dallin

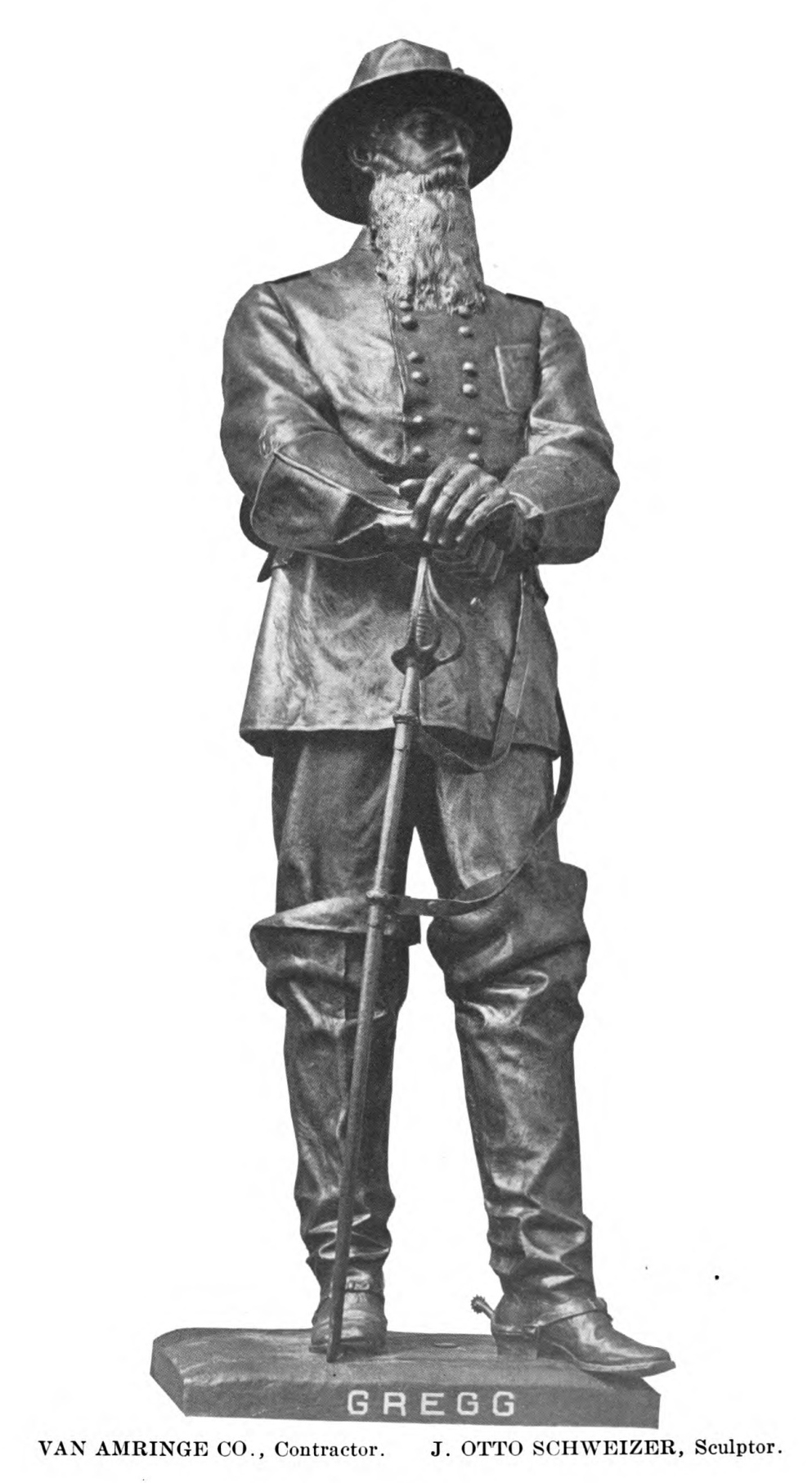
Gen. David McMurtrie Gregg by J. Otto Schweizer

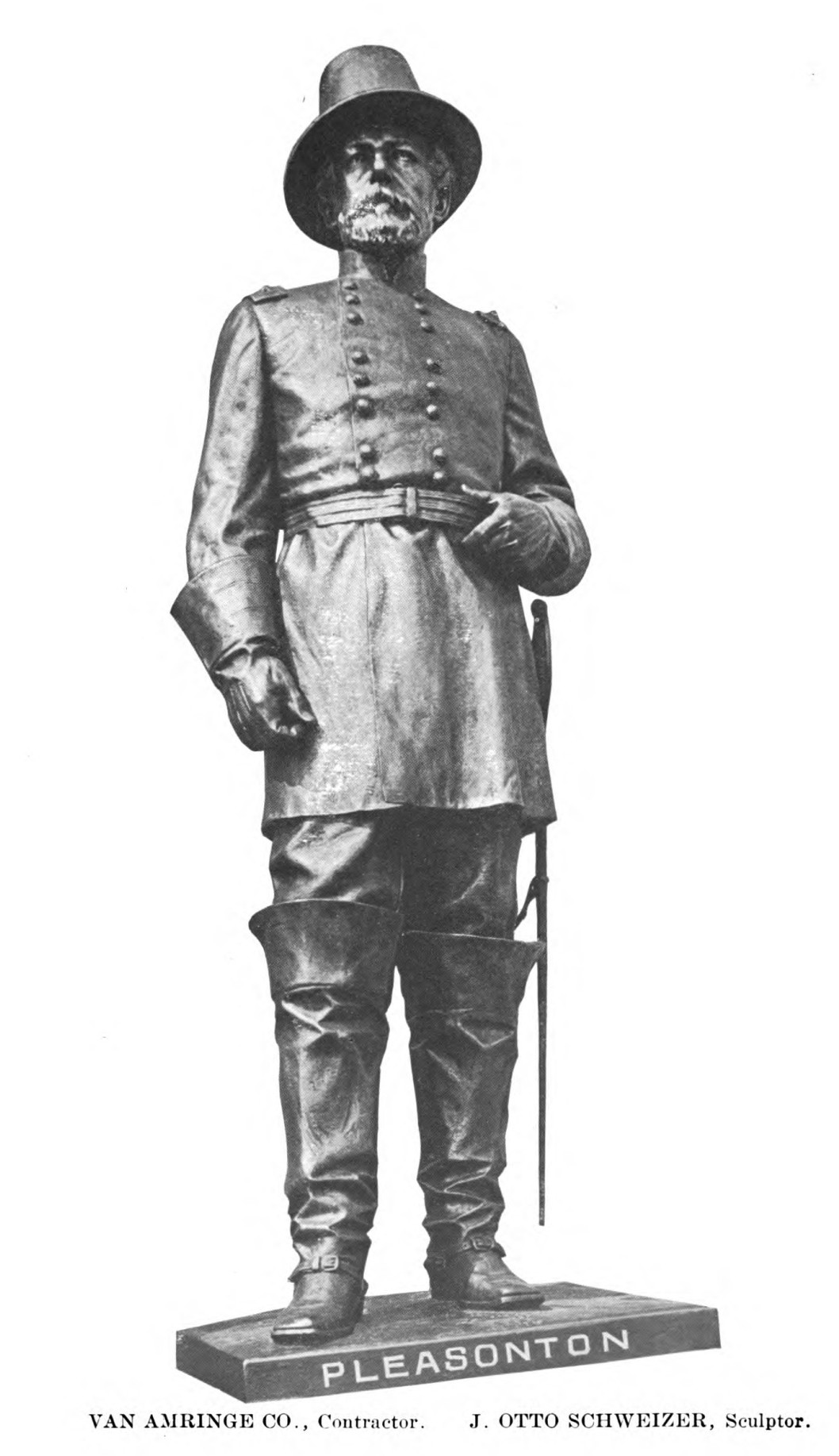
Gen. Alfred Pleasonton by J. Otto Schweizer

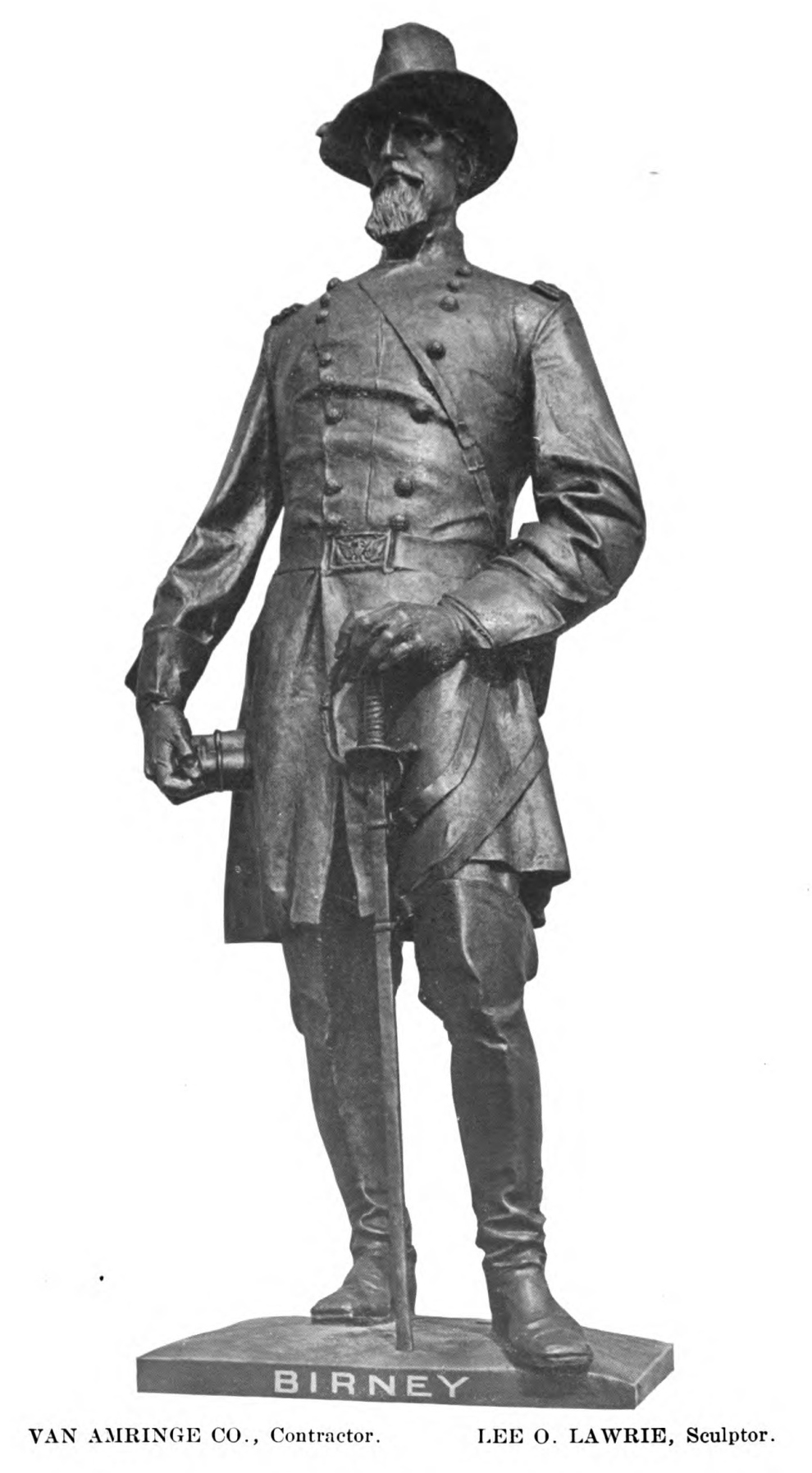
Gen. David B. Birney by Lee Lawrie

=== Architectural sculpture ===
- 4 white marble parapet bas-relief panels:
  - Artillery (1909–10) by Samuel Murray, north parapet.
  - Cavalry (1909–10) by Samuel Murray, south parapet.
  - Infantry (1909–10) by Samuel Murray, west parapet. Pennsylvania Bucktails of Stone's Brigade at the McPherson Farm.
  - Signal Corps (1909–10) by Samuel Murray, east parapet.
- Attendants to Victory, 8 white marble bas-relief goddess figures (1909–10) by Samuel Murray, a pair in the spandrels above each arch.
- 8 white marble Shield & Laurel Wreath bas-reliefs (1909–10) by Samuel Murray, one in the niche above each portrait statue.
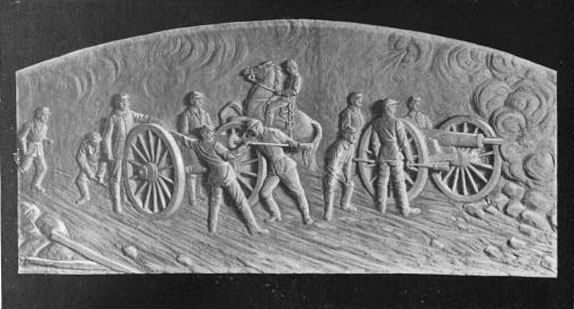
Artillery

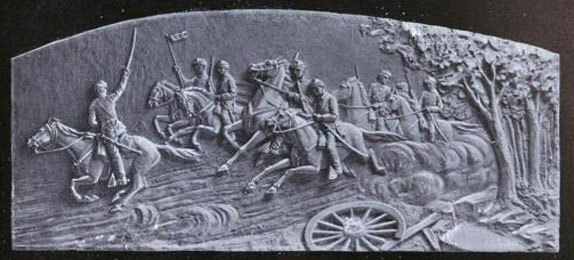
Cavalry

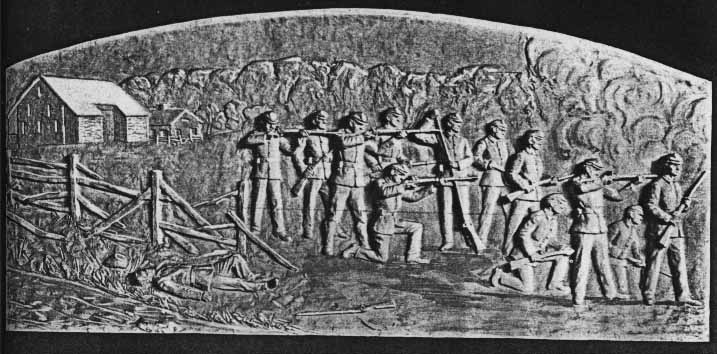
Infantry

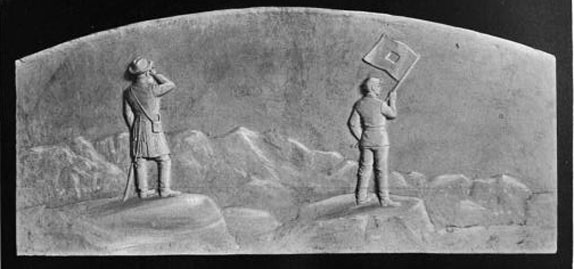
Signal Corps

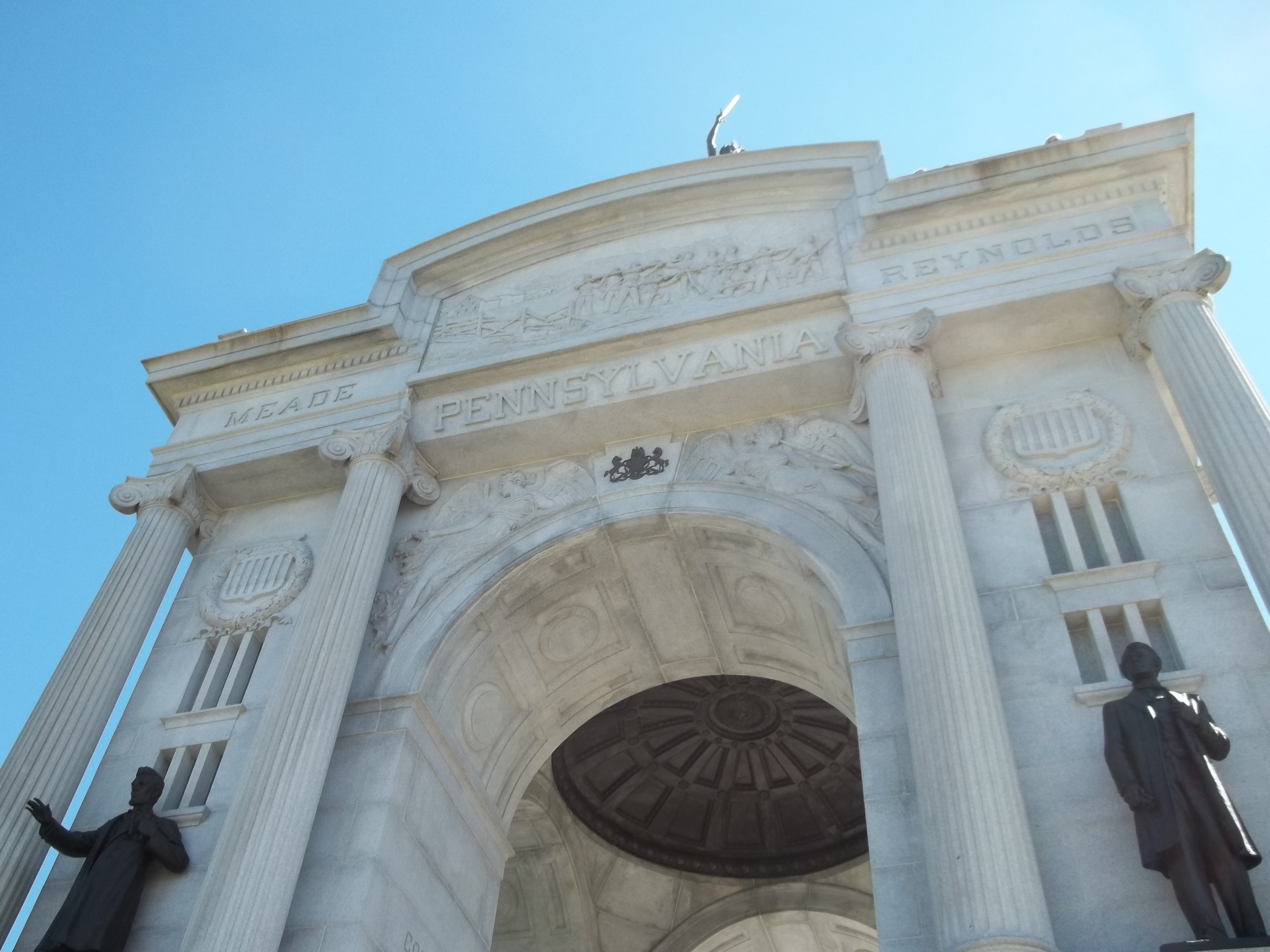
Attendants to Victory (reclining goddesses above arch), north side

=== Regimental memorials ===
The perimeter wall features 75 bronze plaques memorializing Pennsylvania units during the war.

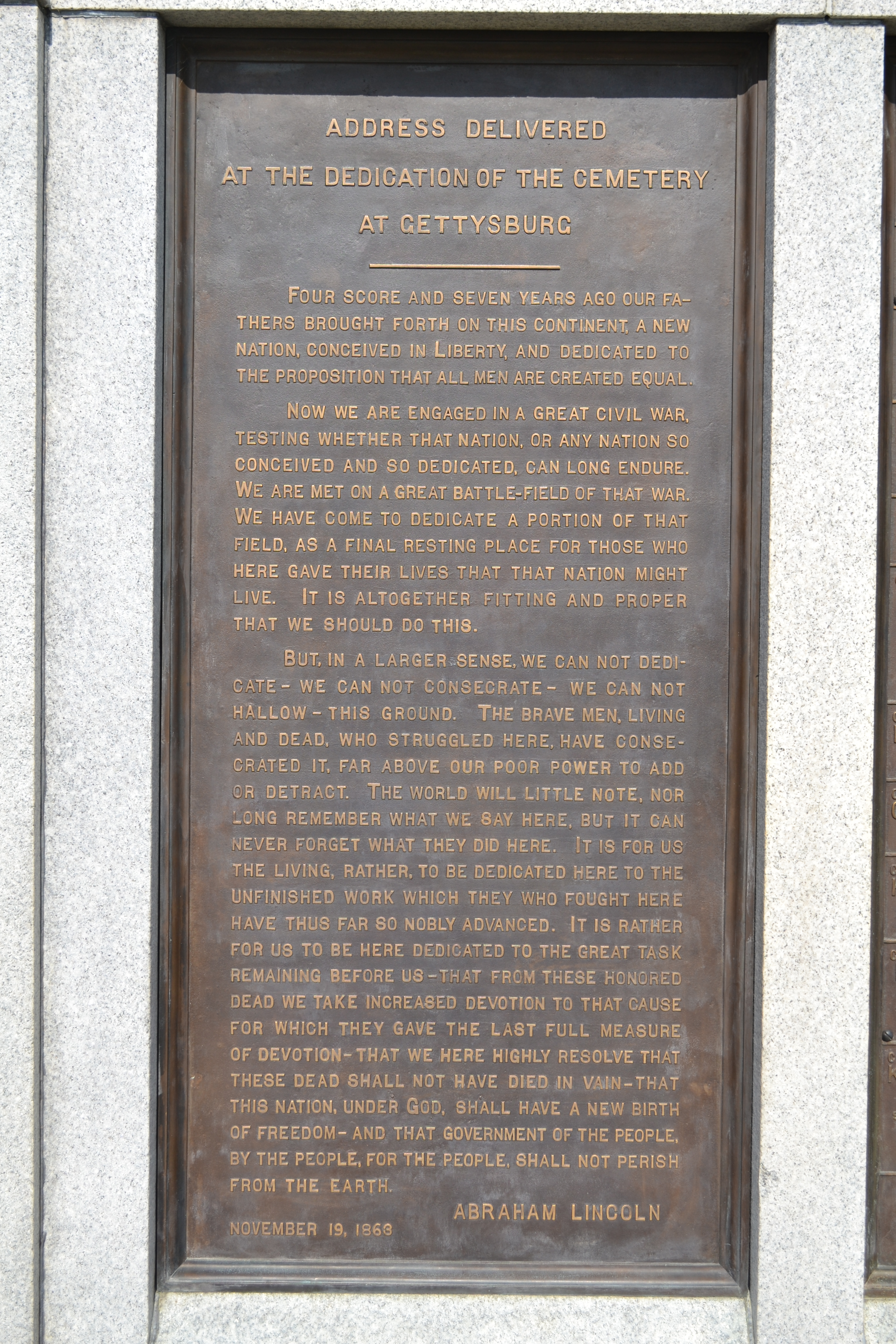
Gettysburg Address

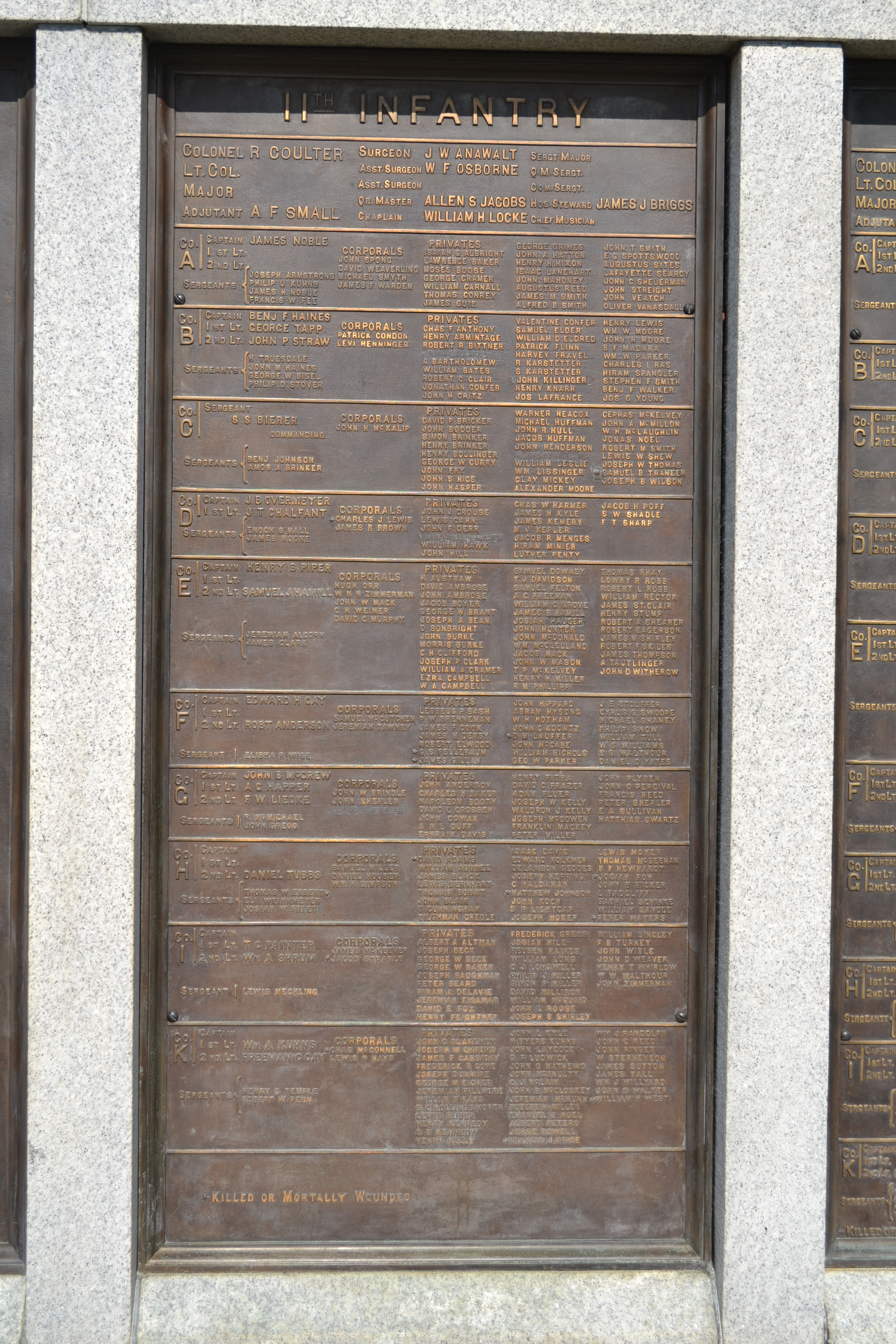
11th Infantry Regiment

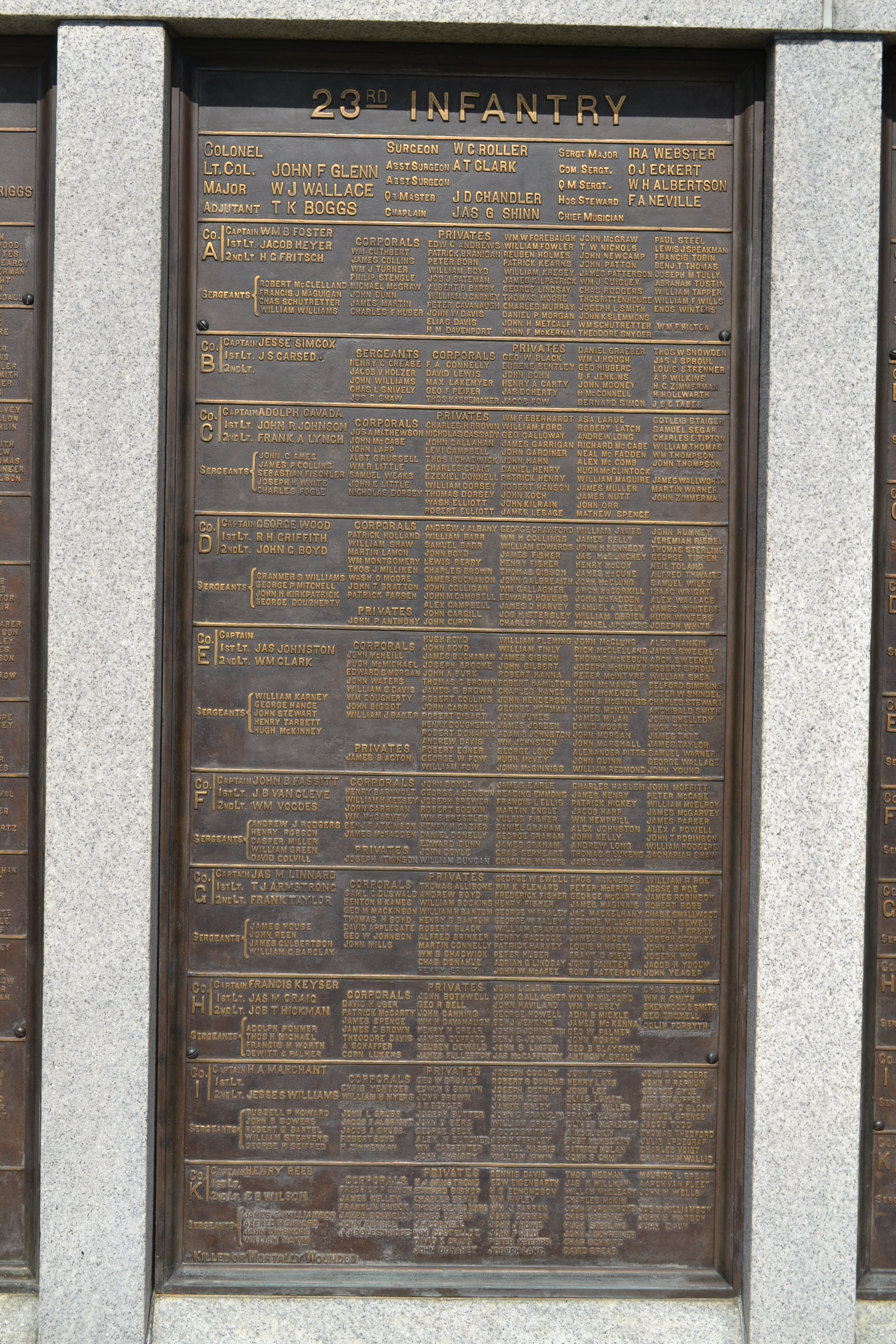
23rd Infantry Regiment

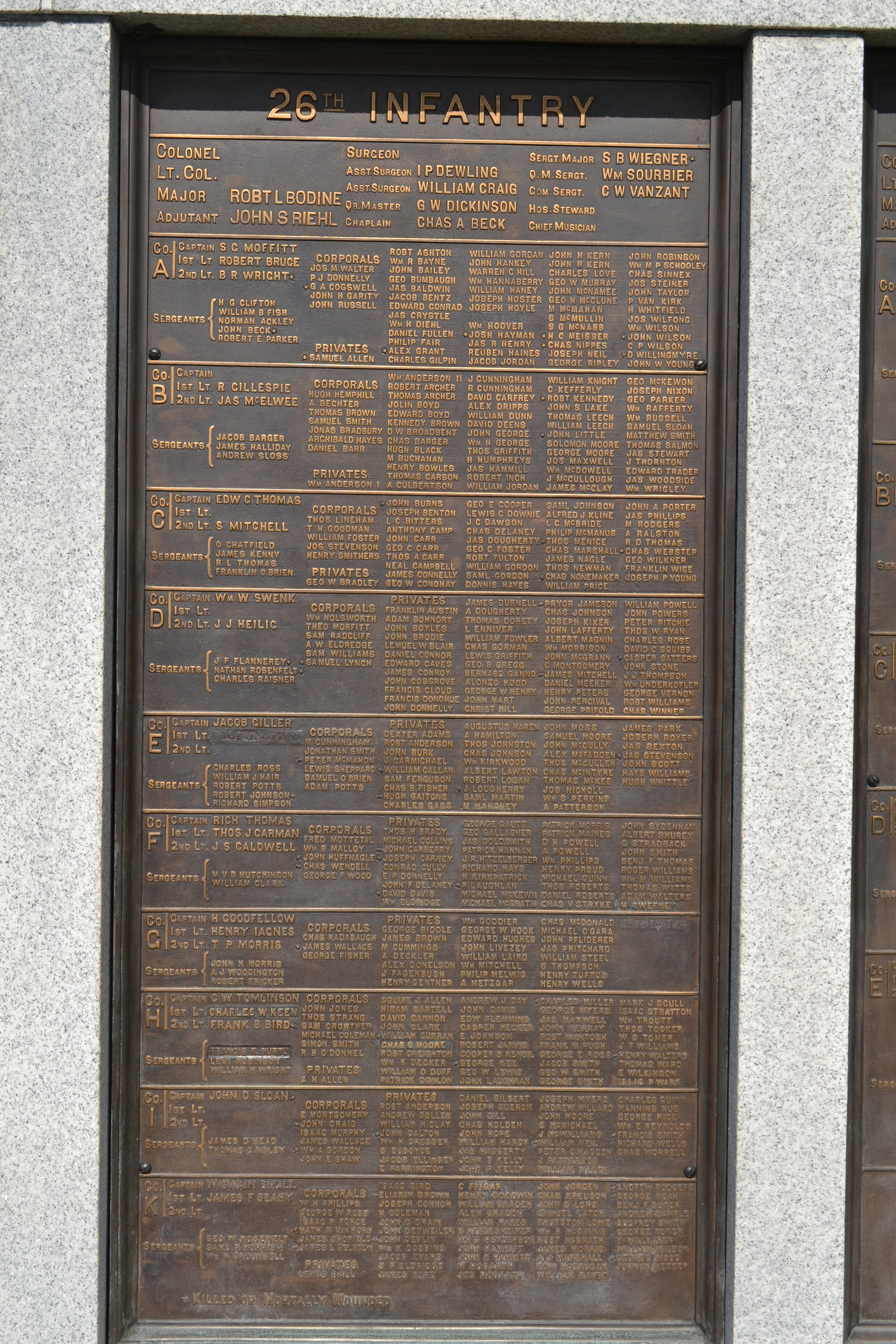
26th Infantry Regiment

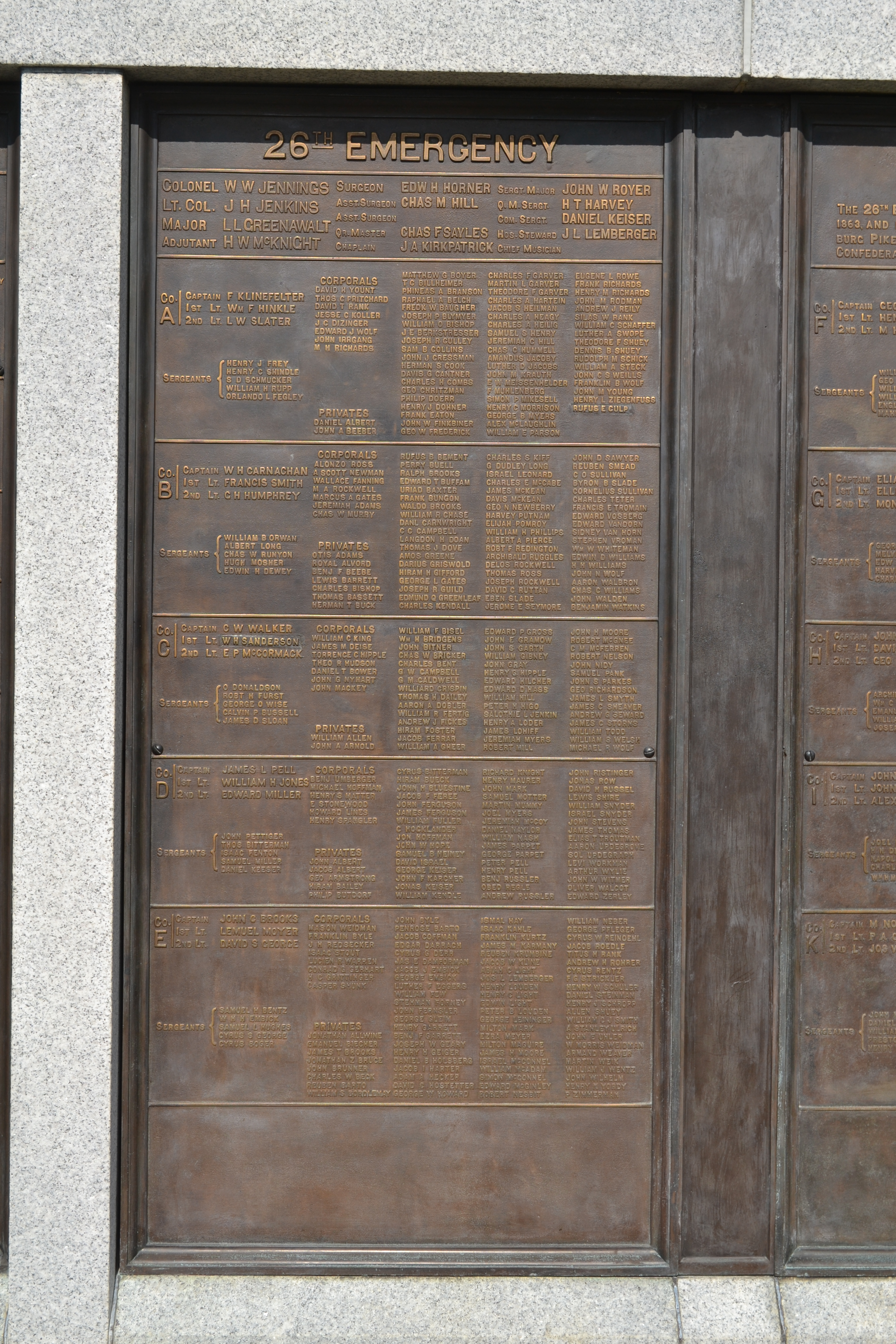
26th Emergency Infantry Regiment

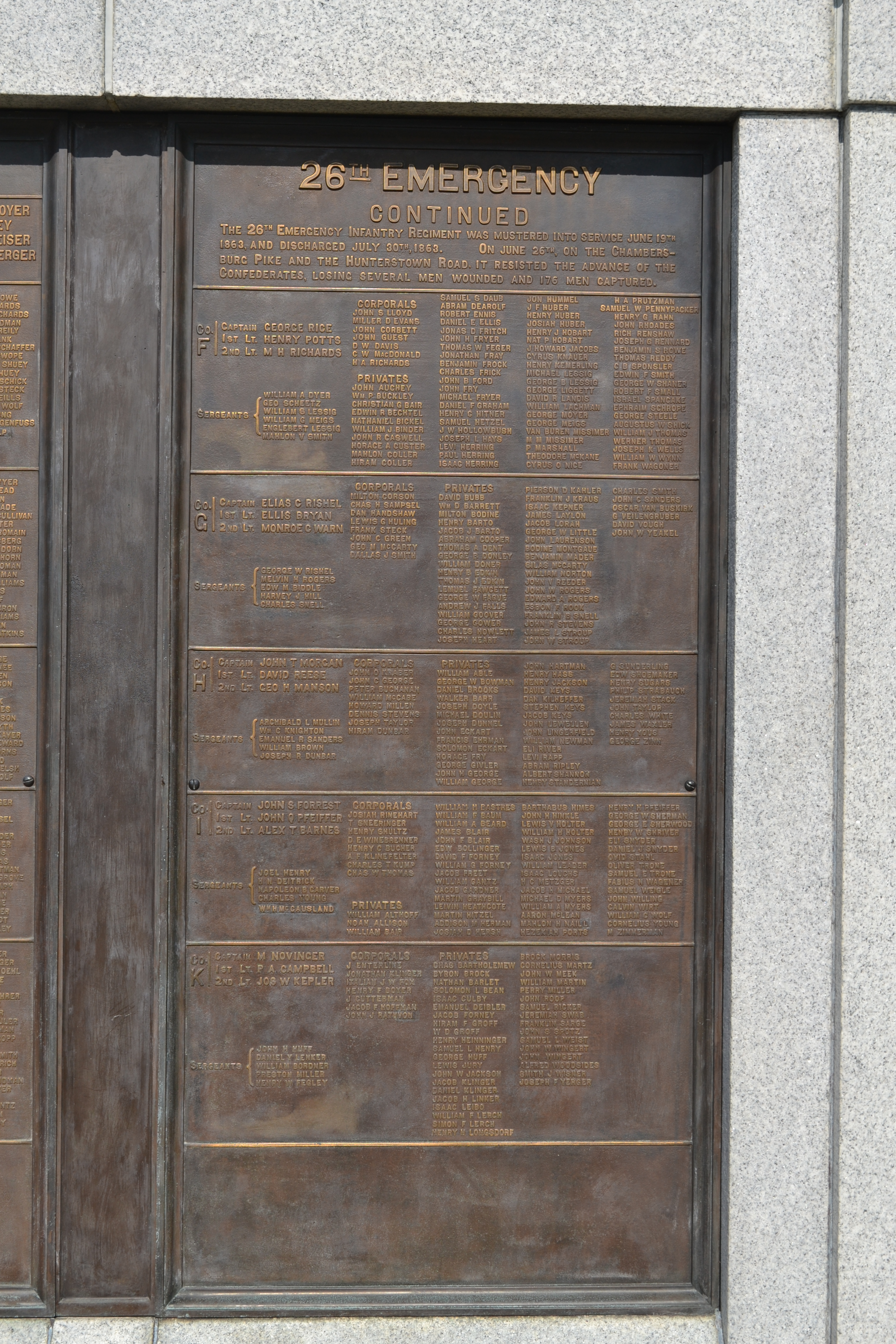
26th Emergency Infantry Regiment

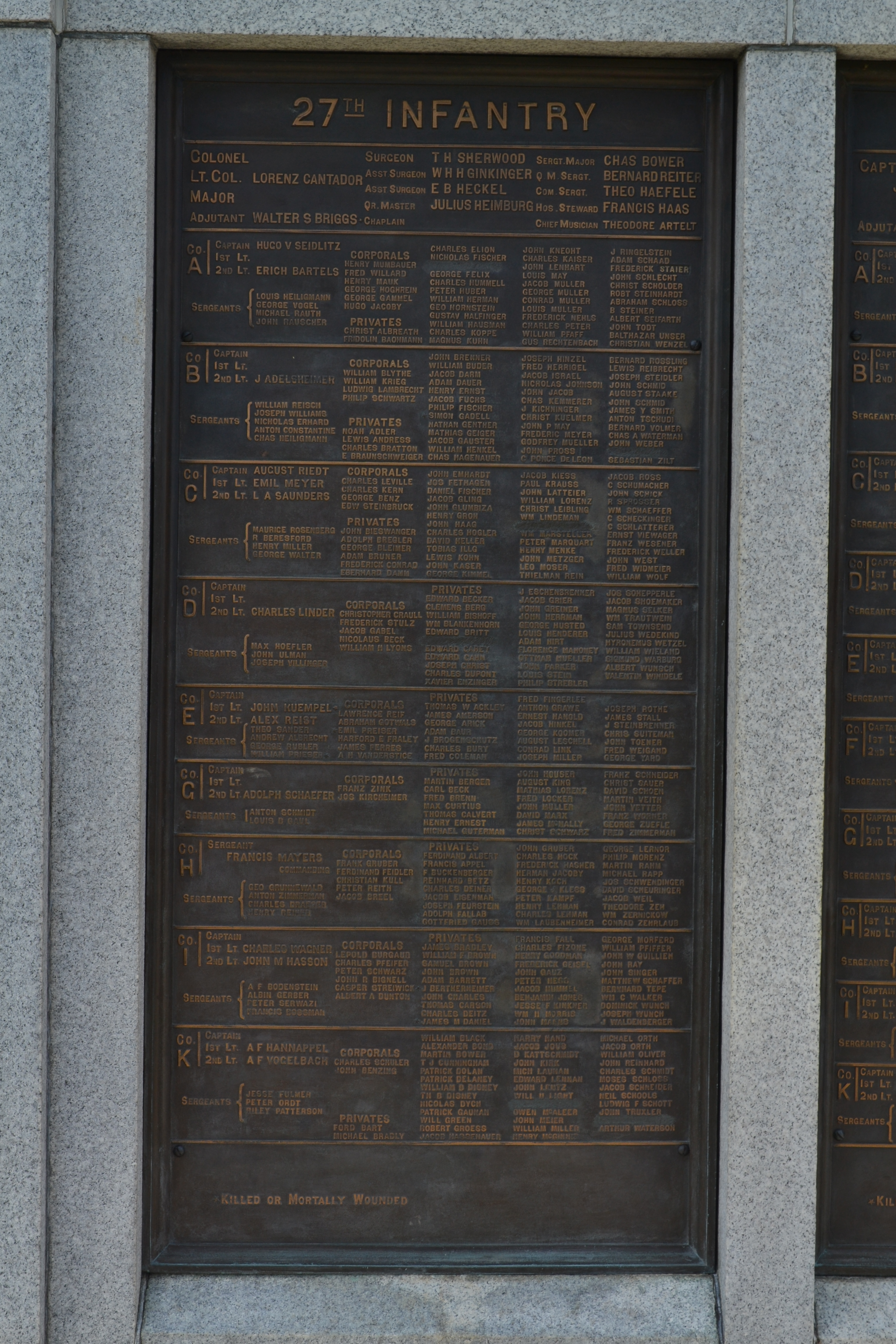
27th Infantry Regiment

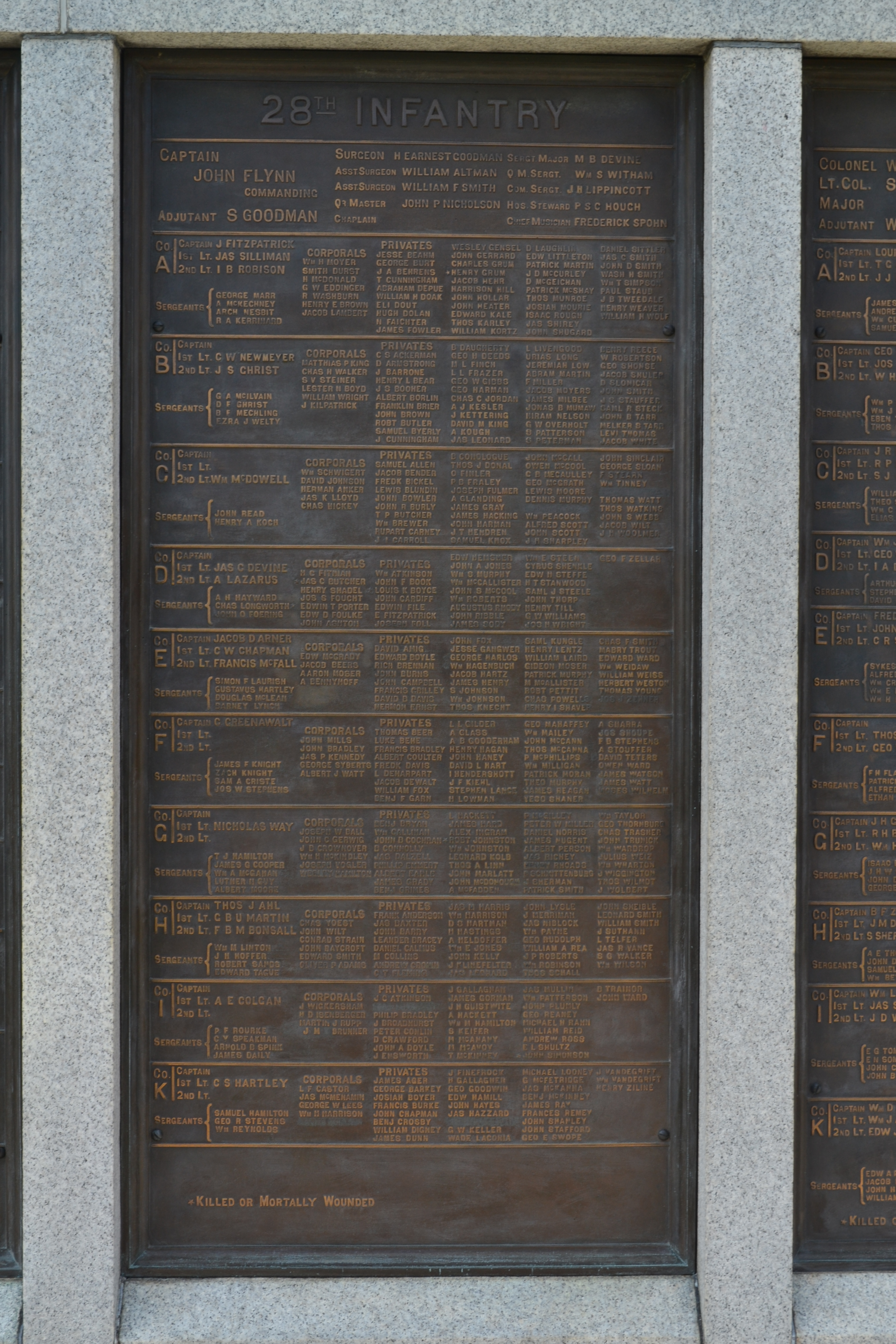
28th Infantry Regiment

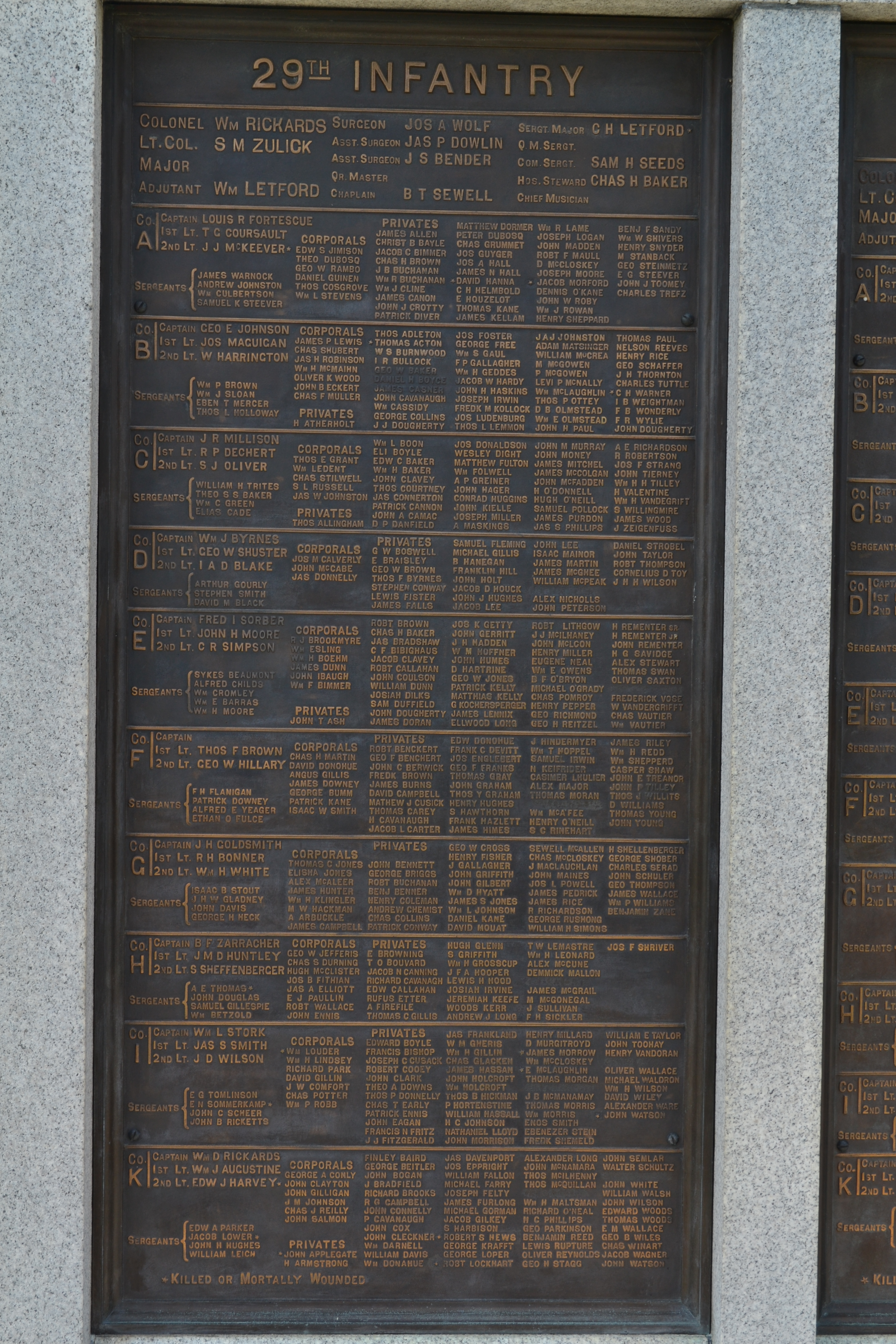
29th Infantry Regiment

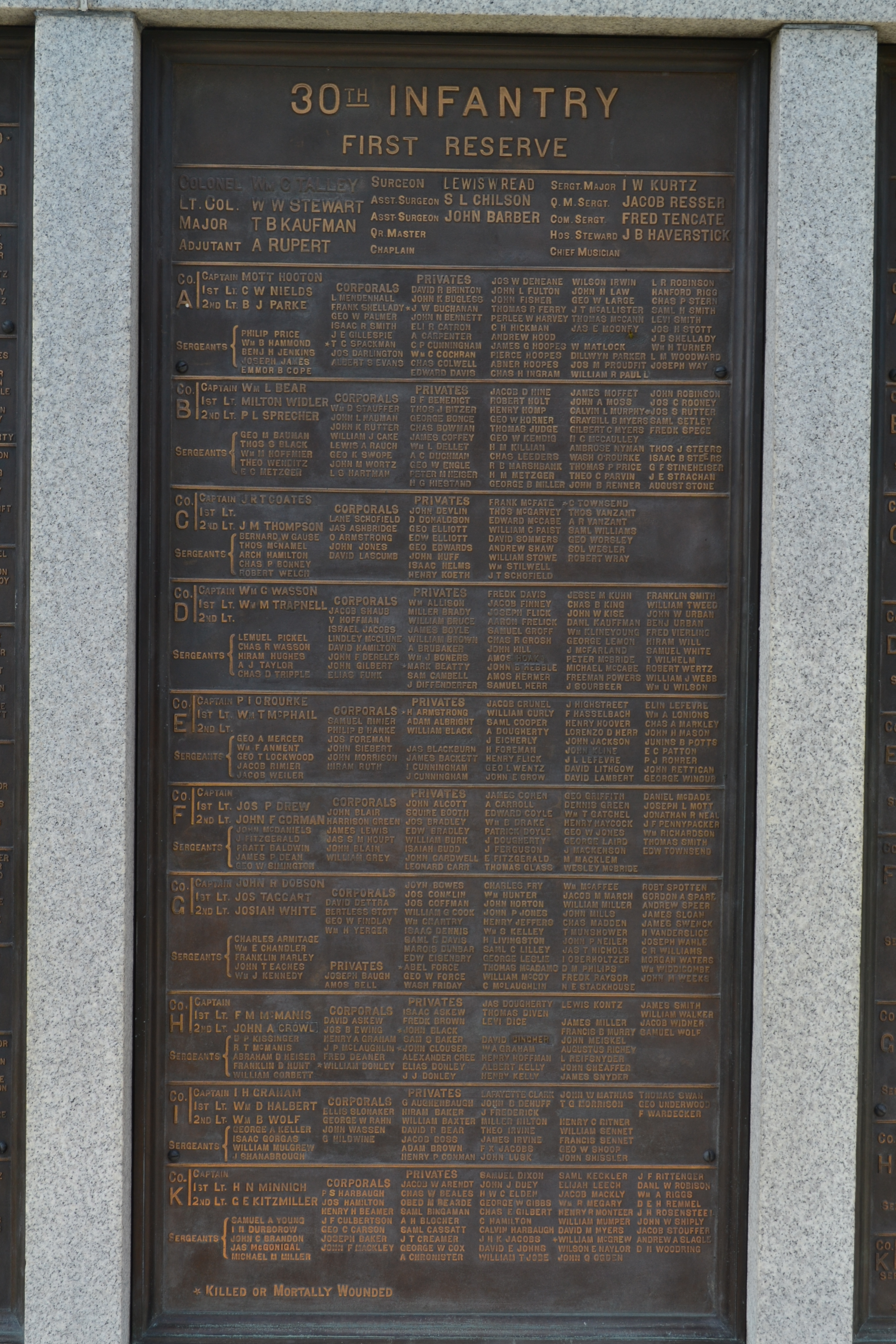
30th Infantry Regiment

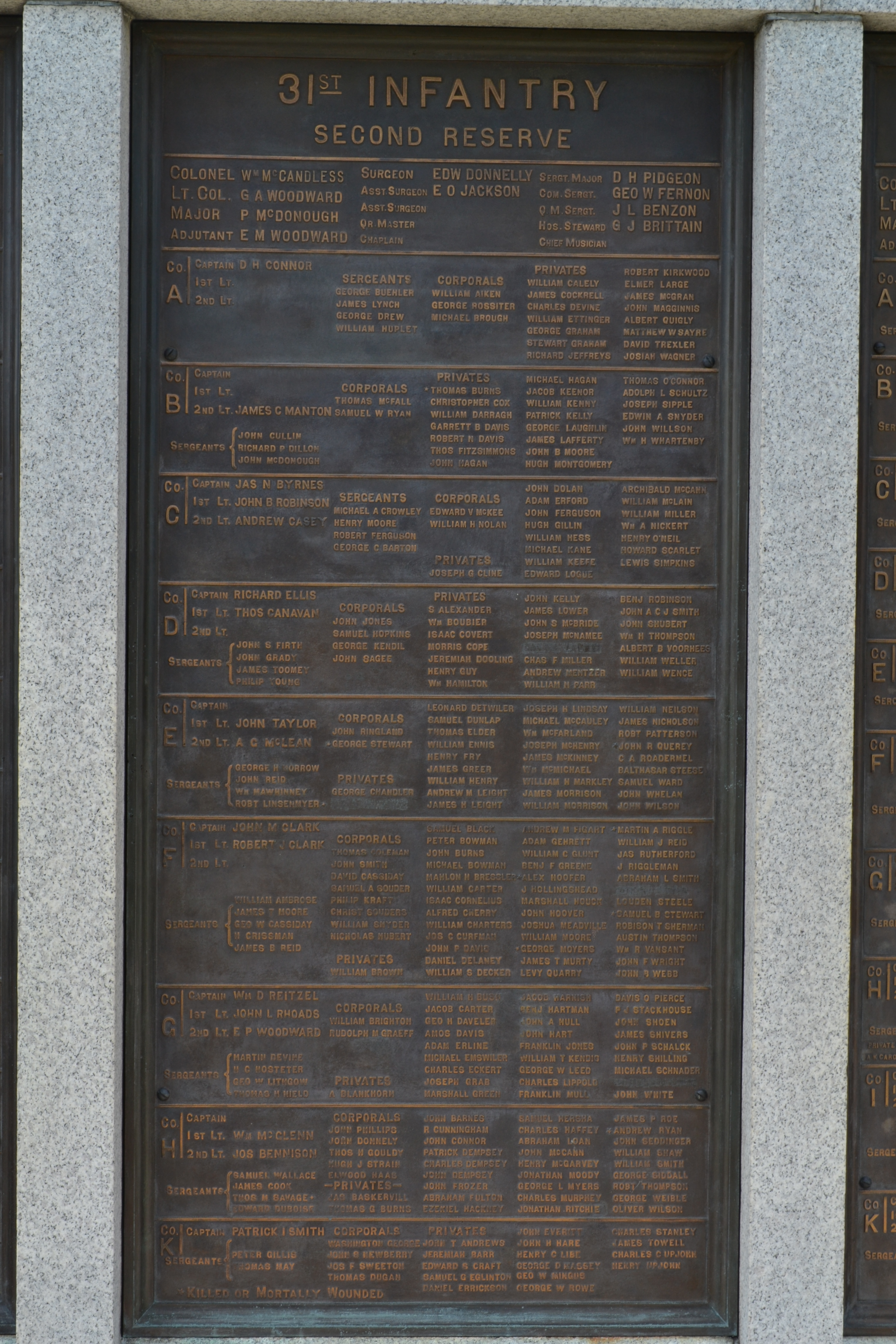
31st Infantry Regiment

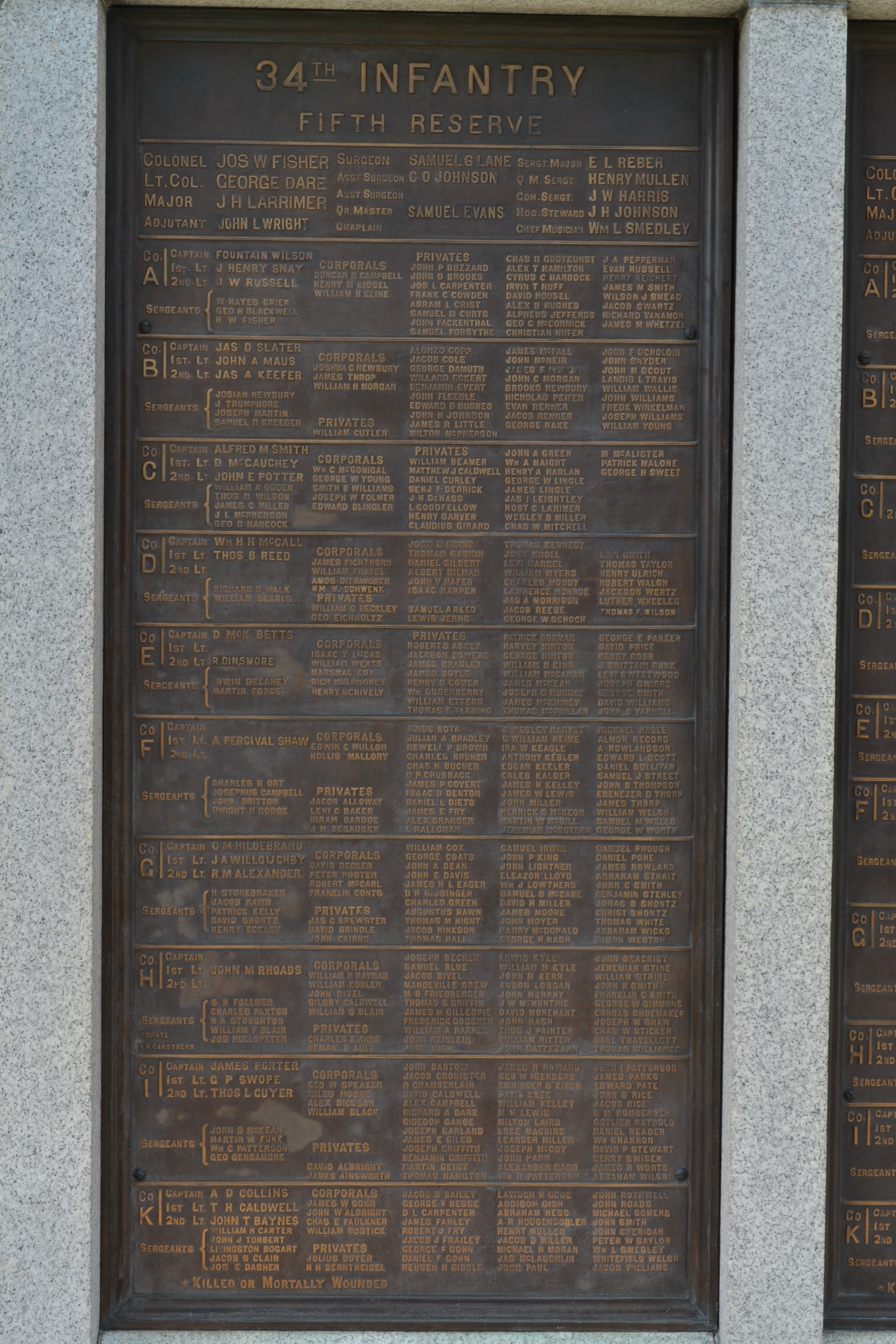
34th Infantry Regiment

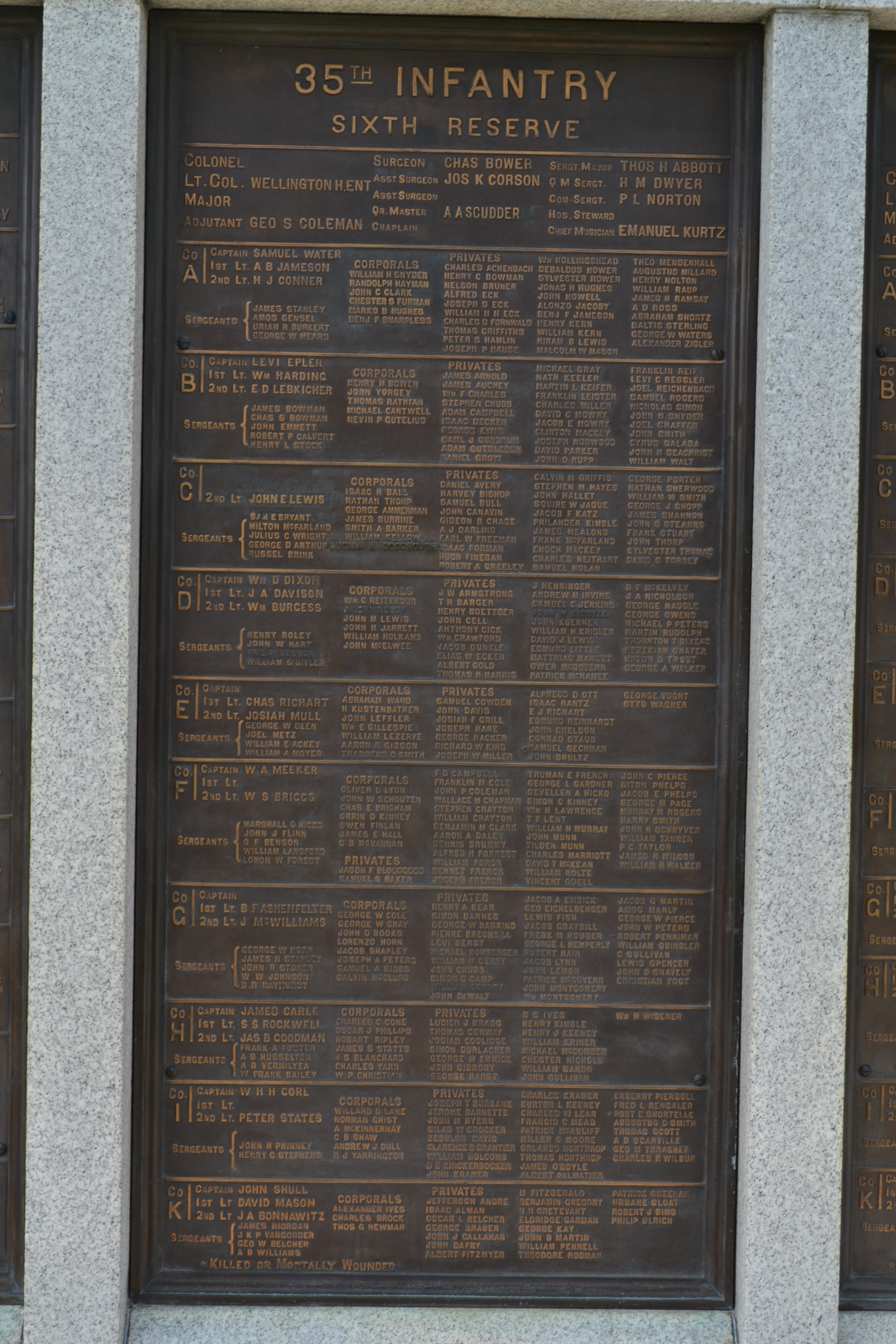
35th Infantry Regiment

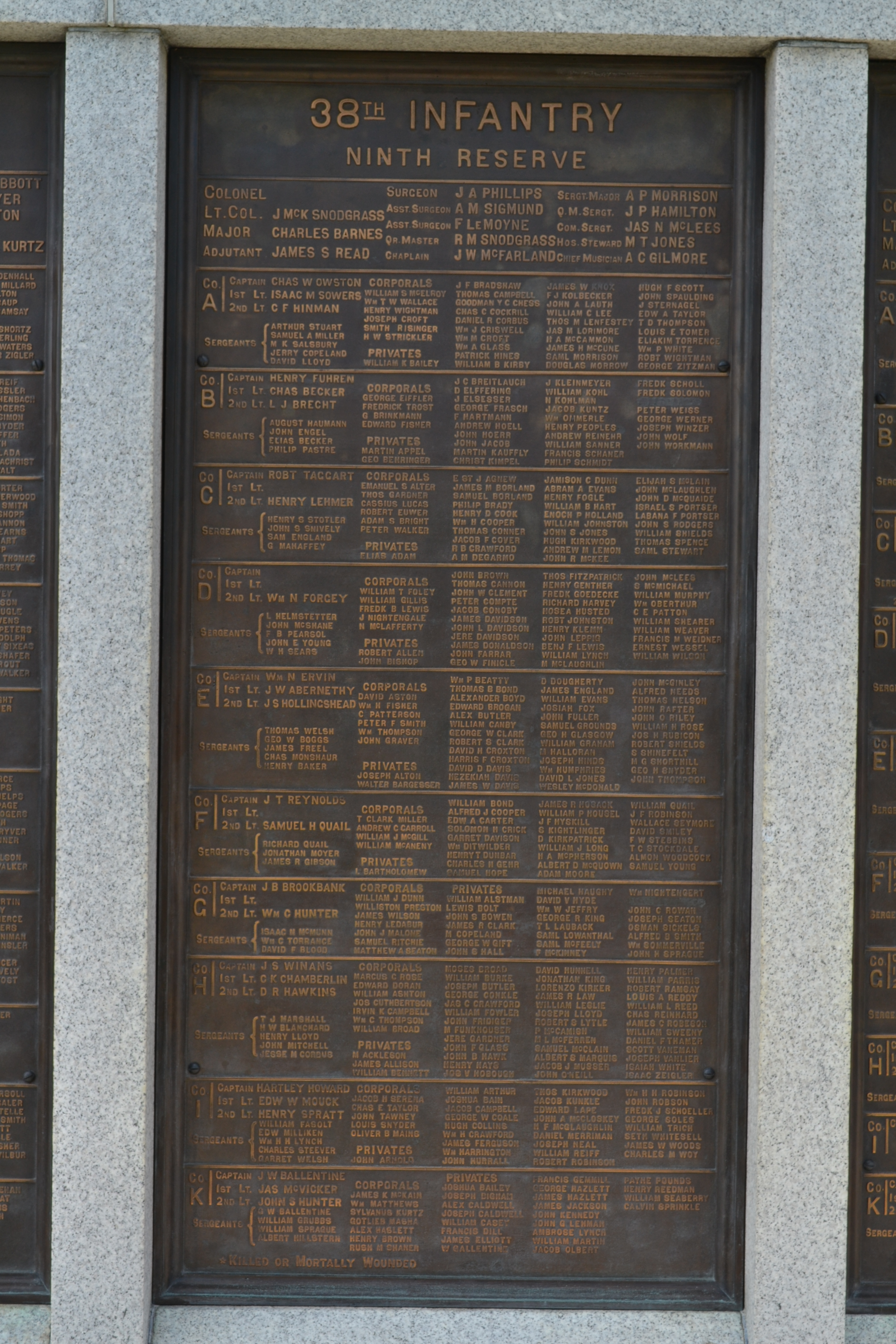
38th Infantry Regiment

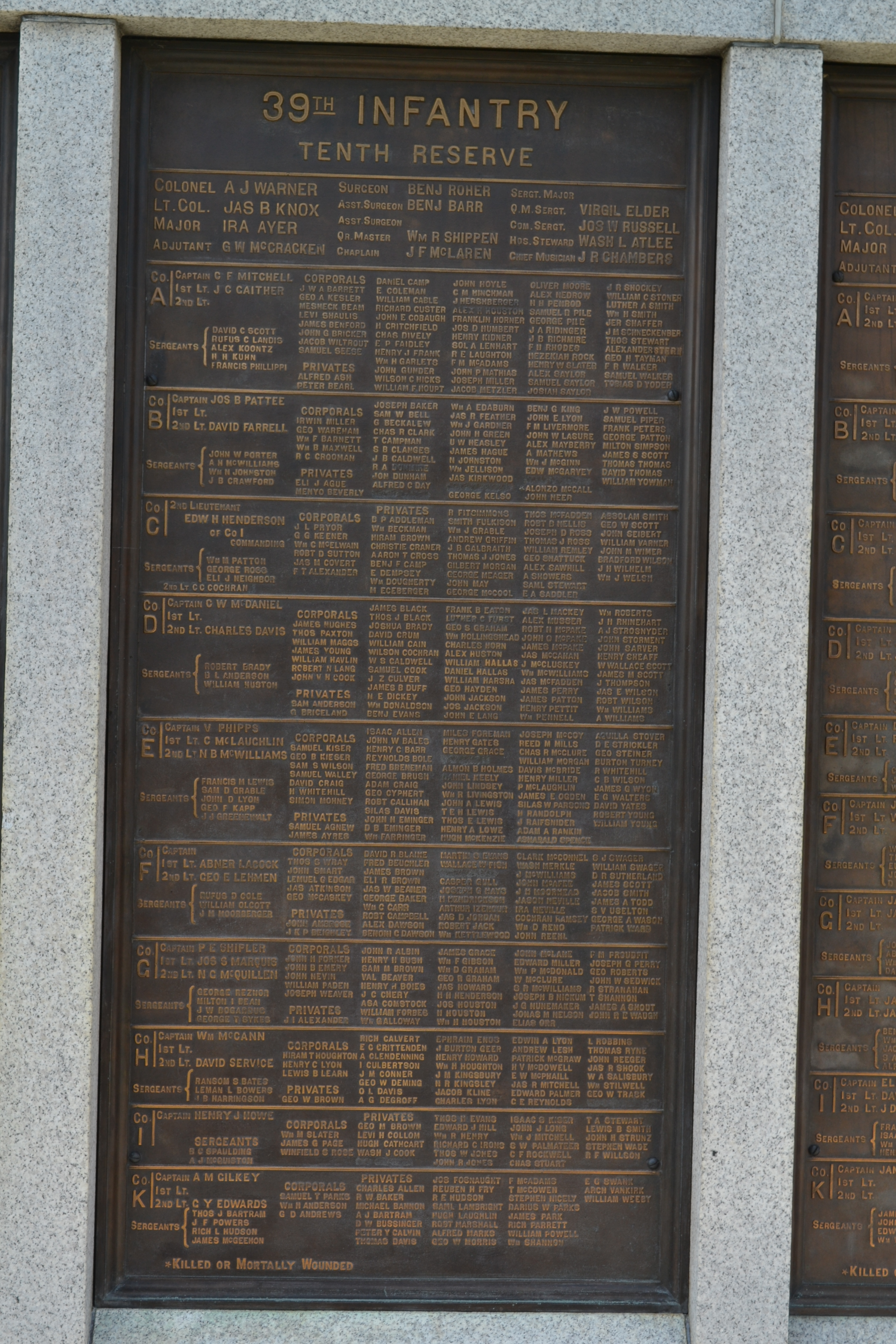
39th Infantry Regiment

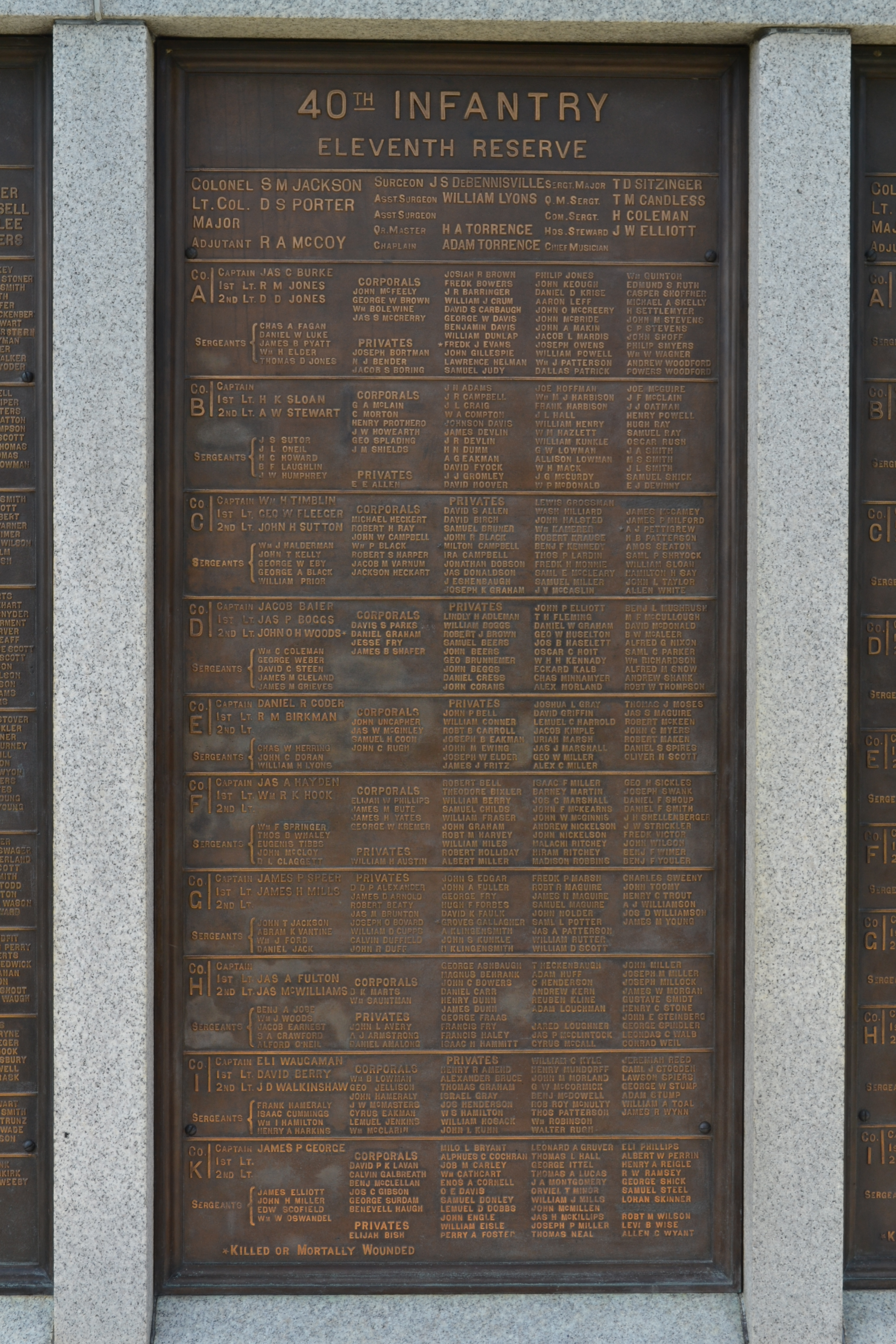
40th Infantry Regiment

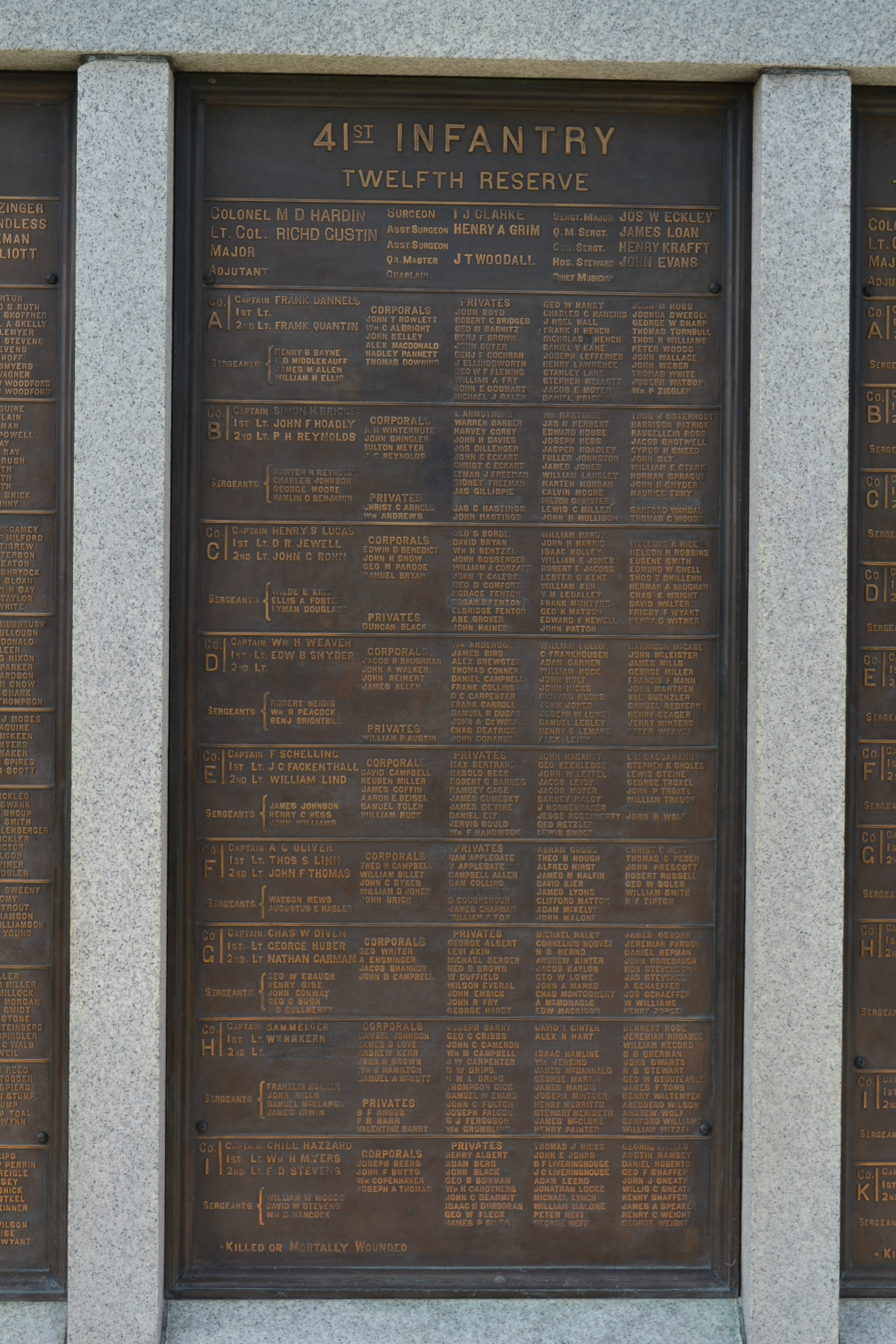
41st Infantry Regiment

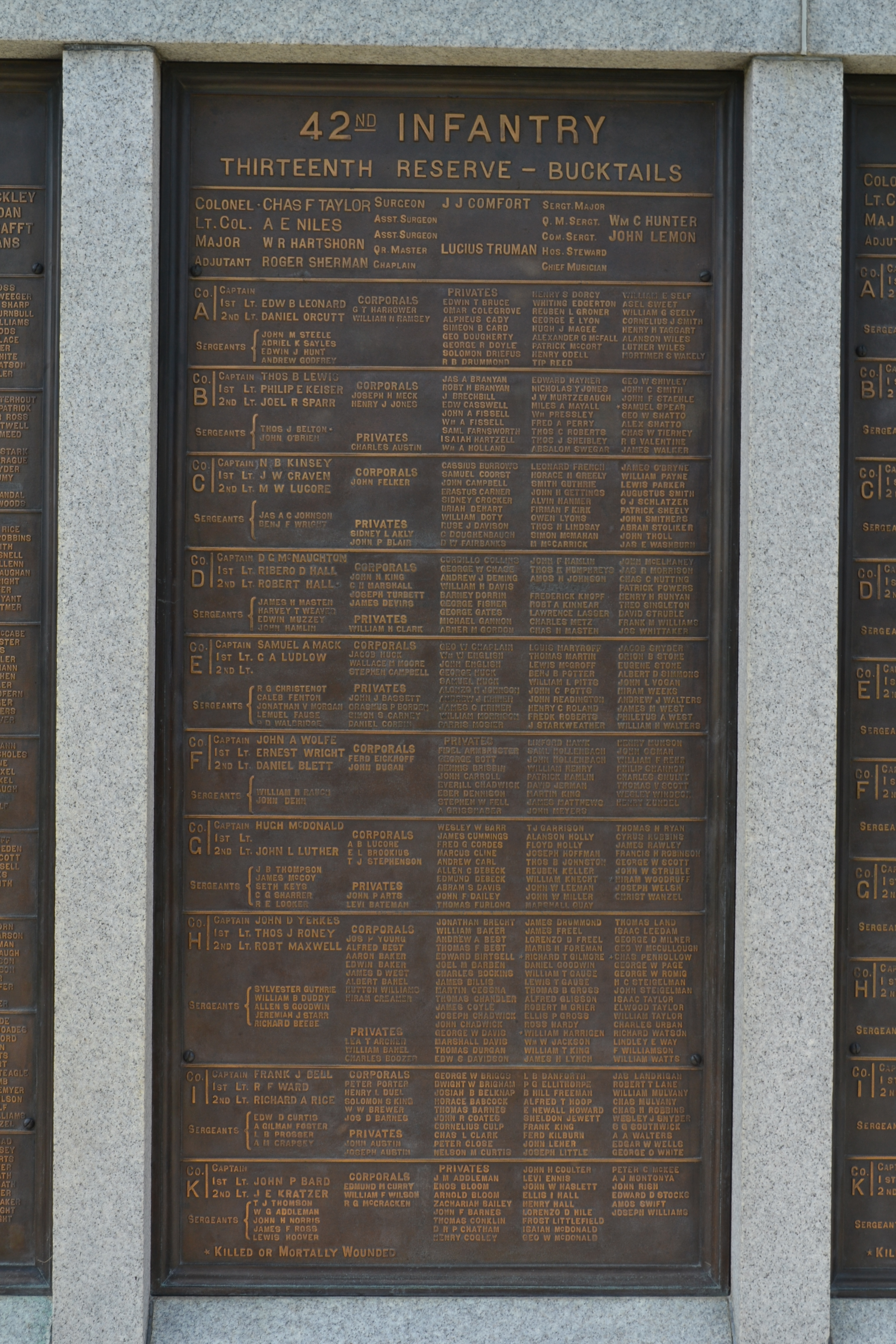
42nd Infantry Regiment

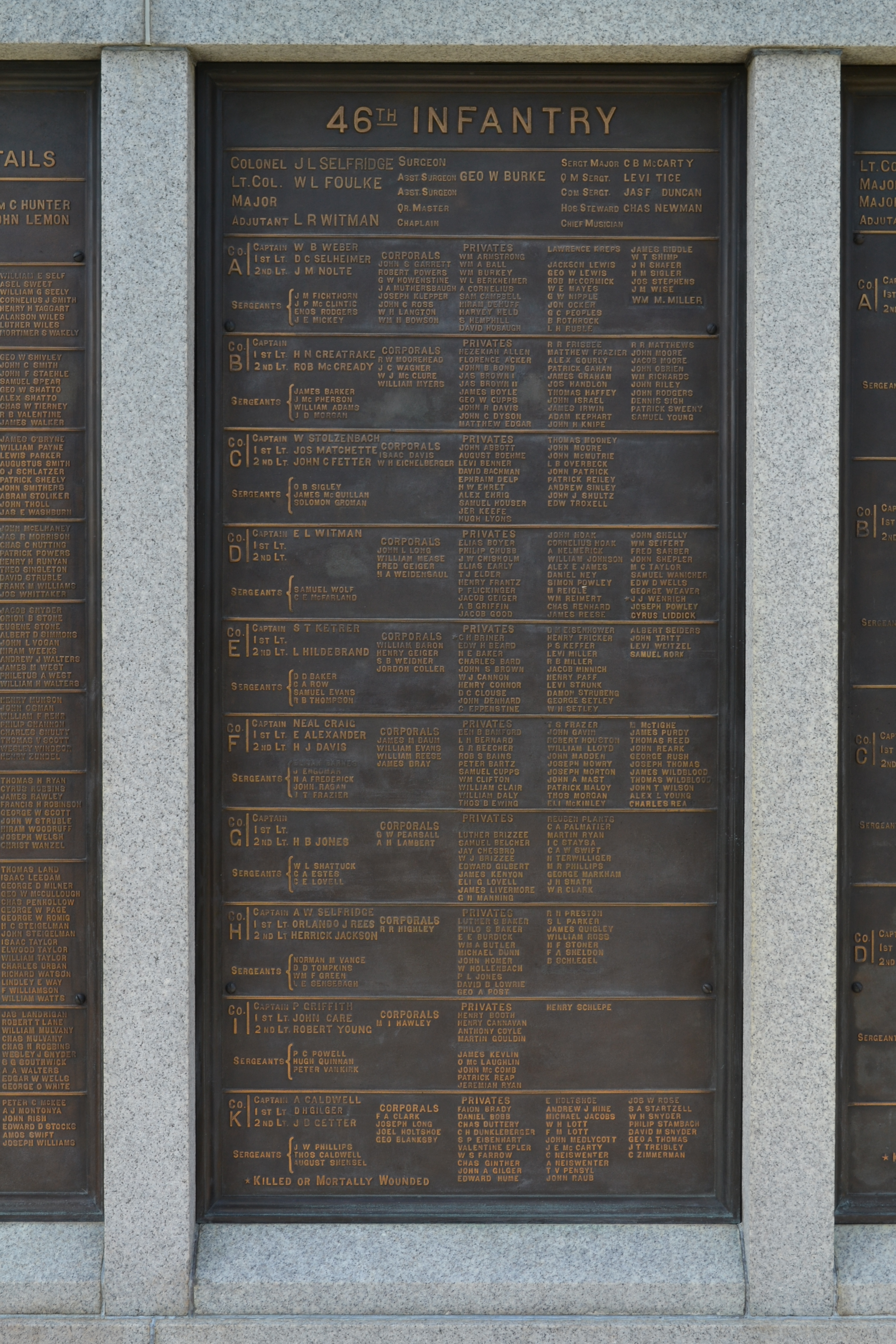
46th Infantry Regiment

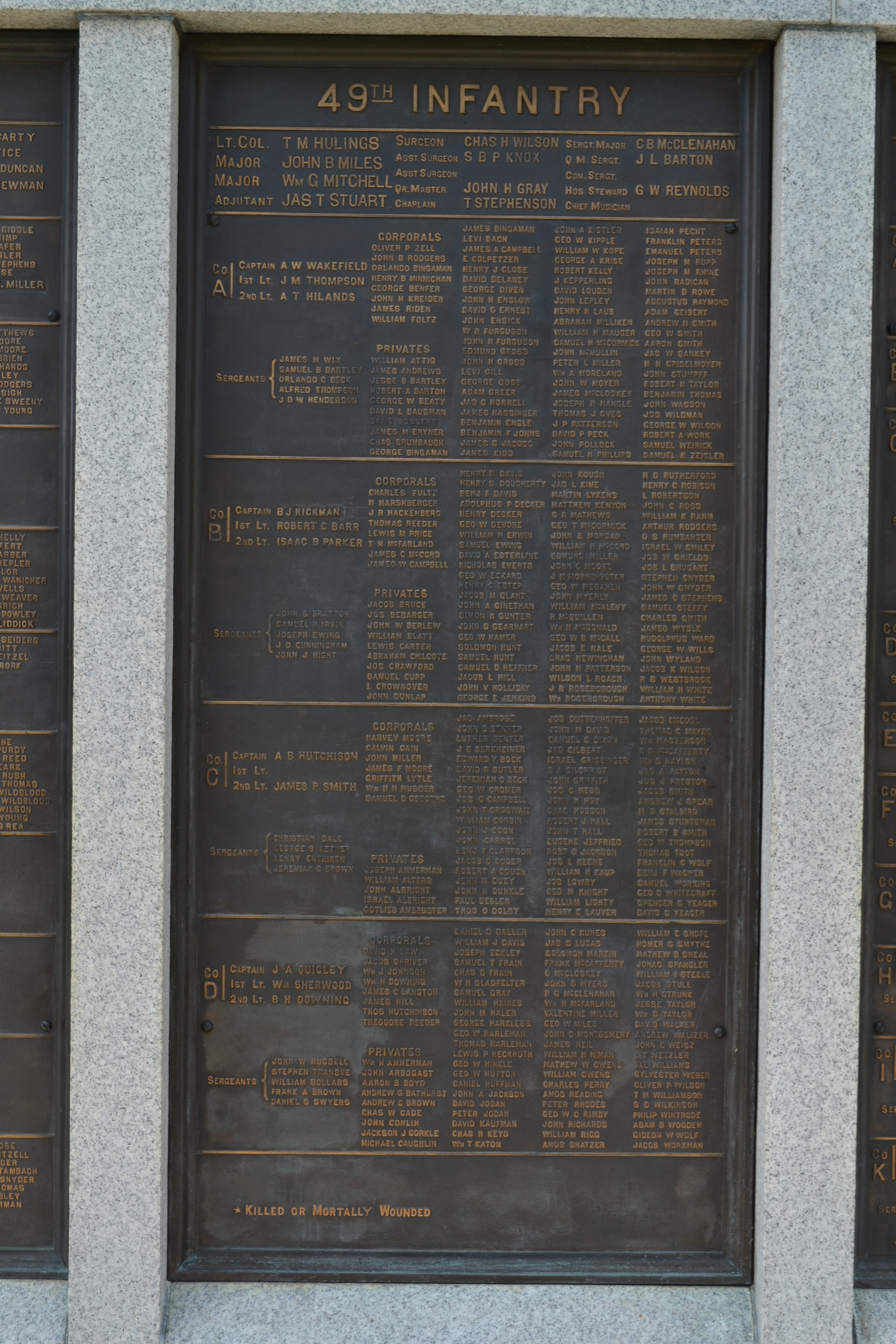
49th Infantry Regiment

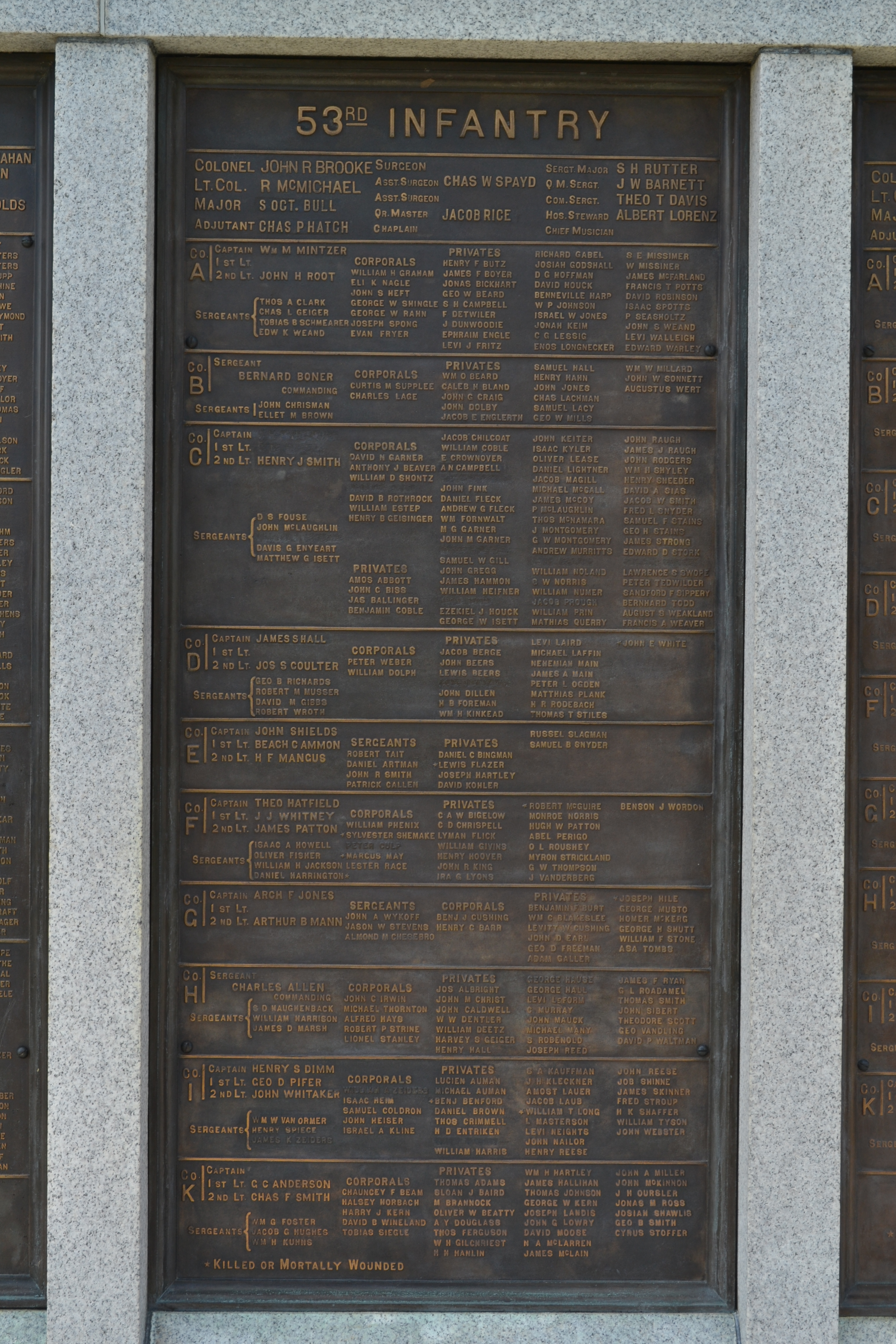
53rd Infantry Regiment

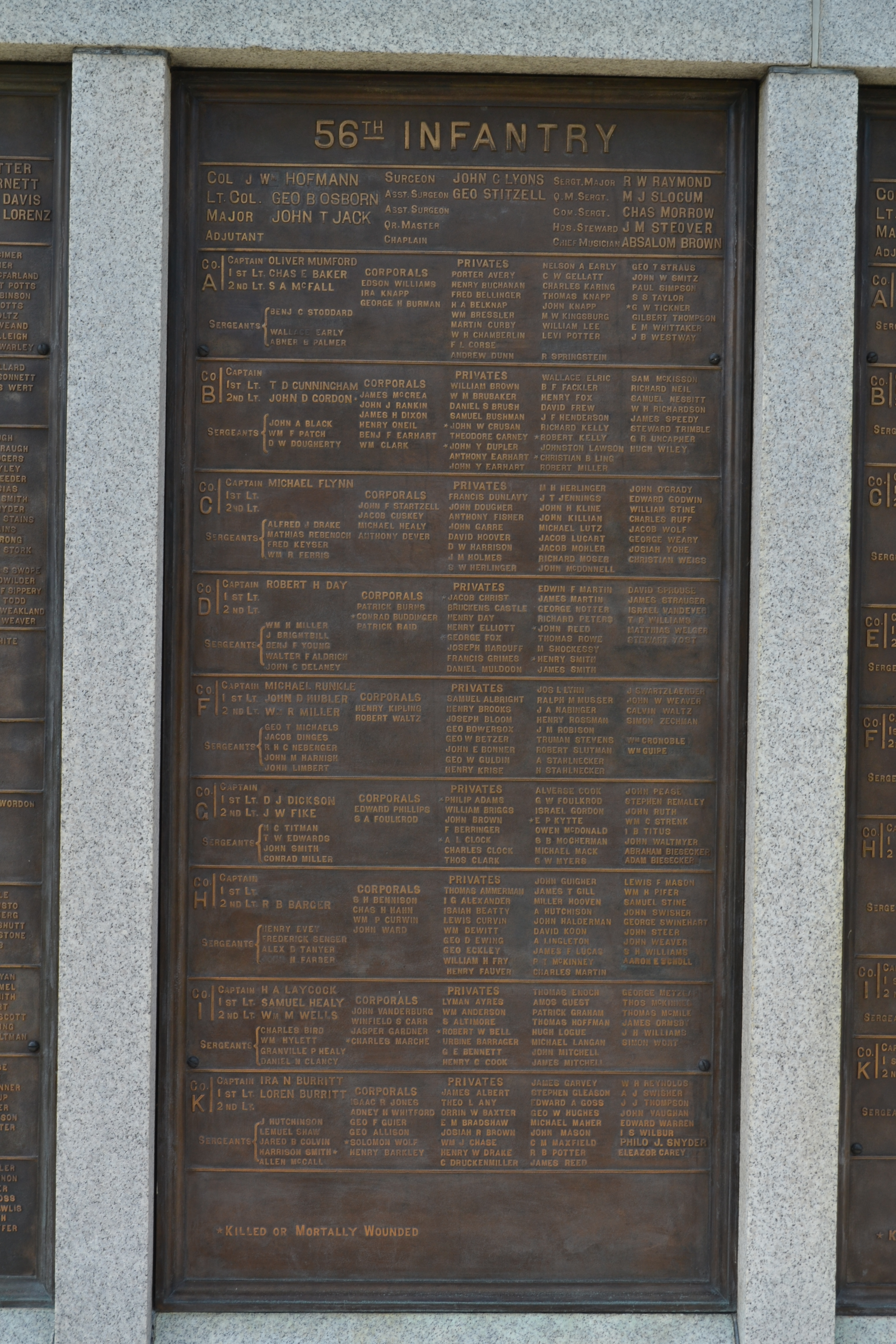
56th Infantry Regiment

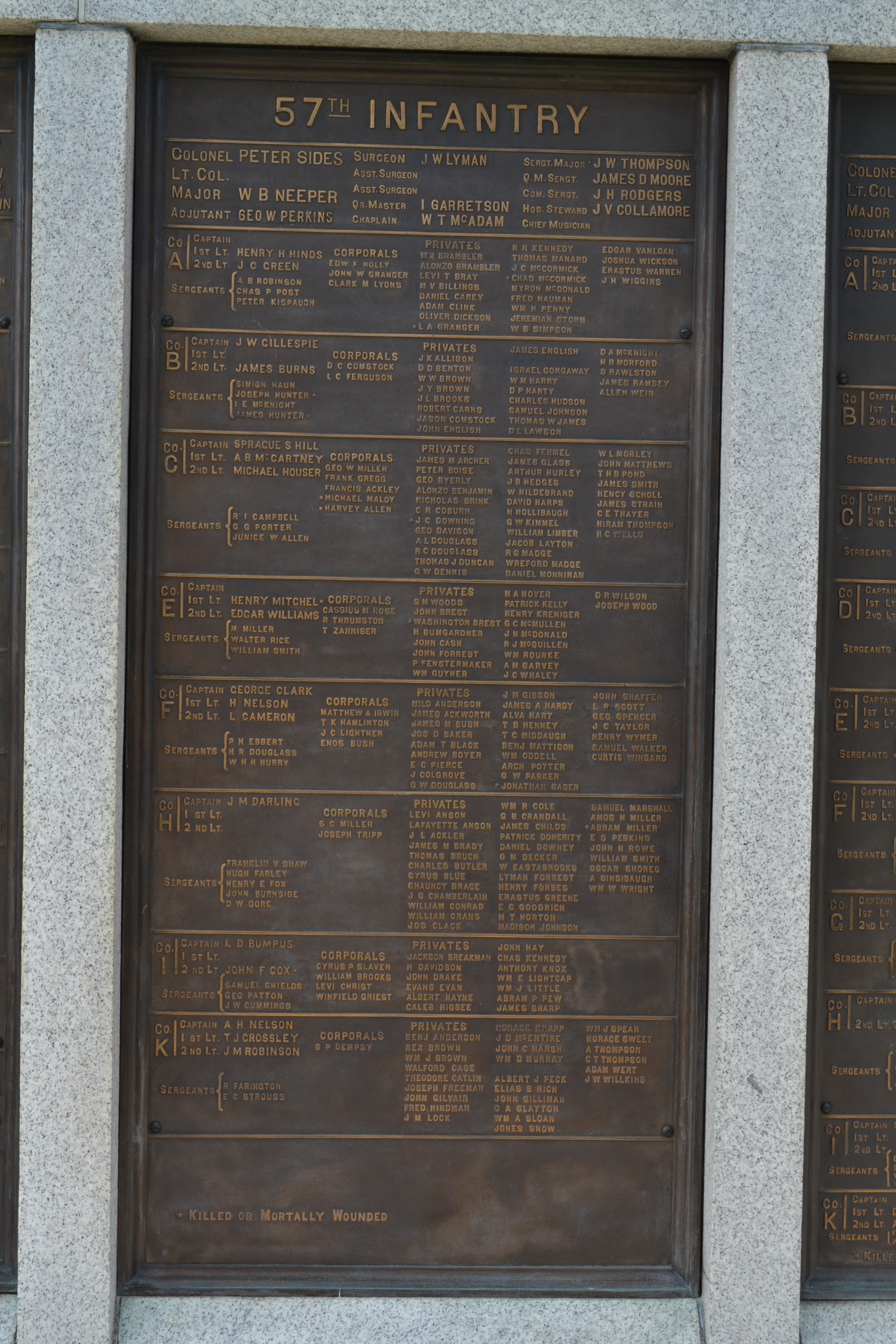
57th Infantry Regiment

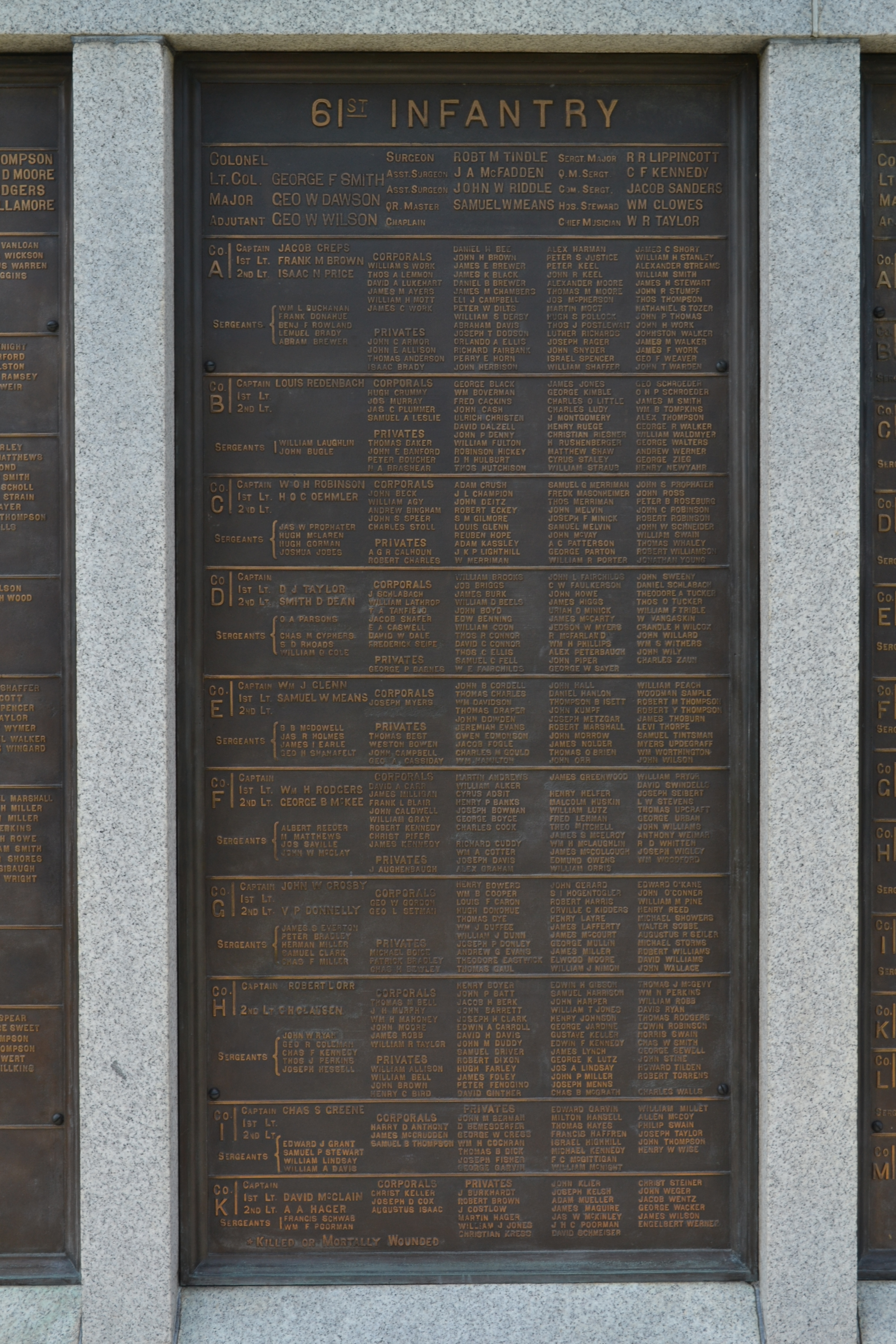
61st Infantry Regiment

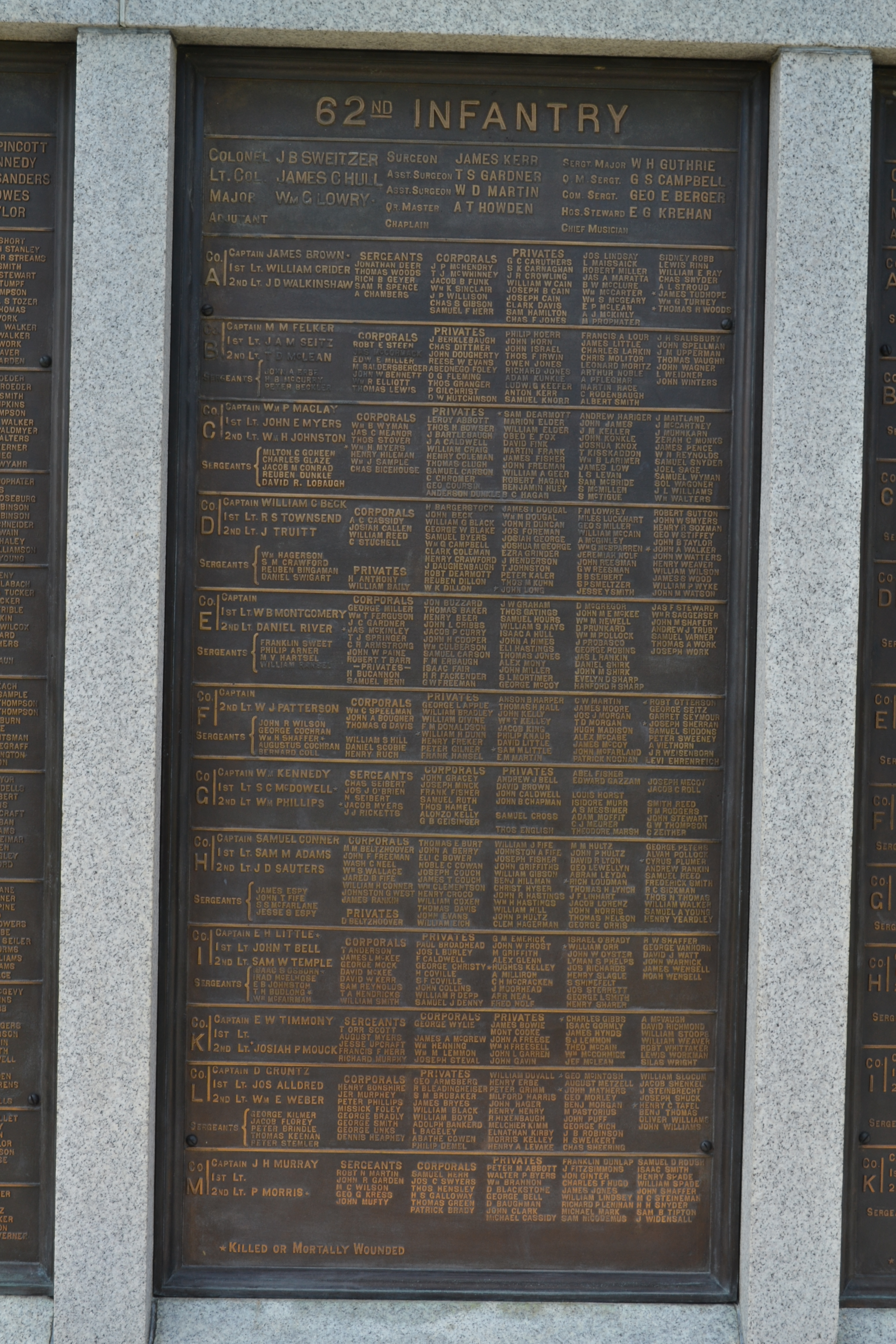
62nd Infantry Regiment

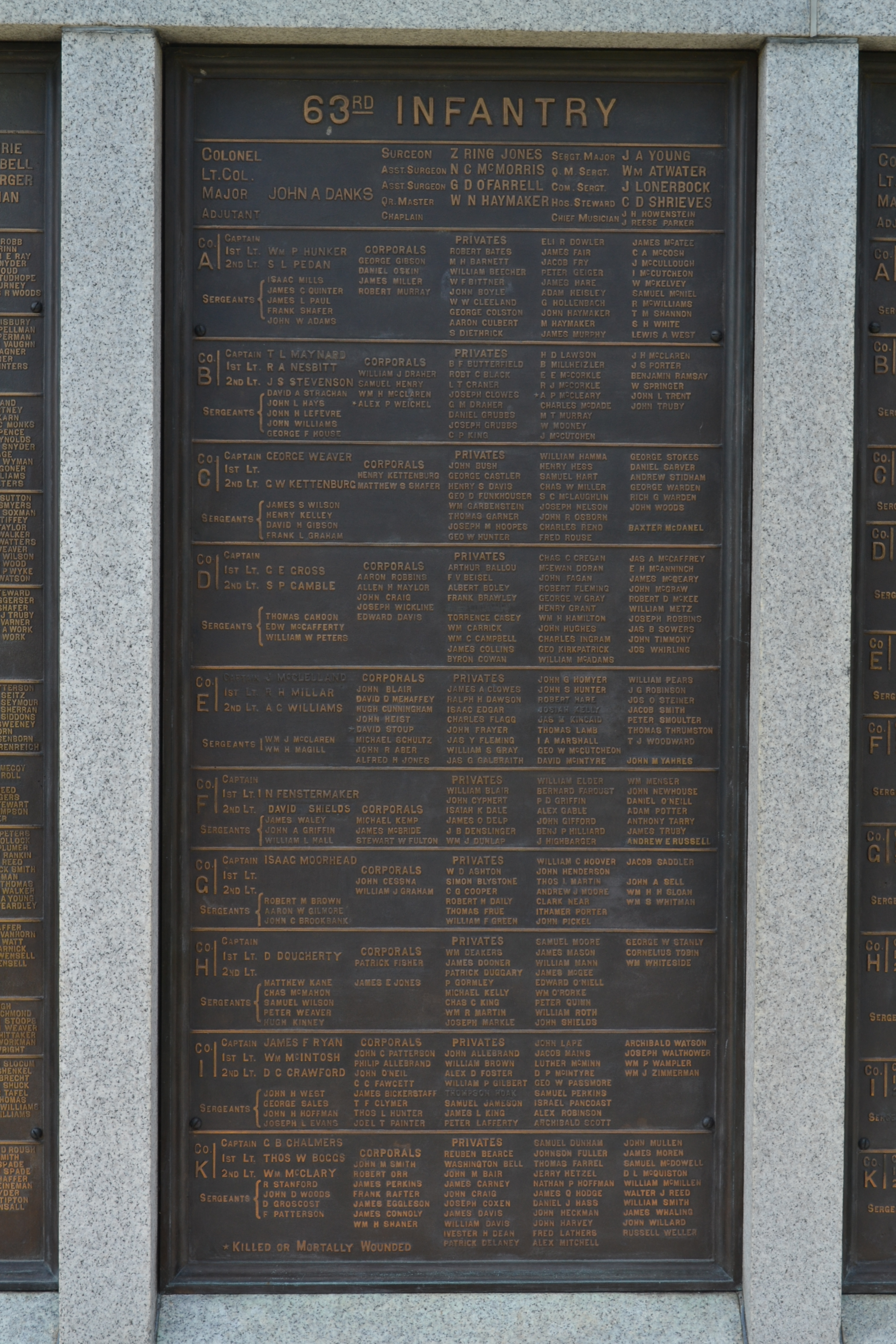
63rd Infantry Regiment

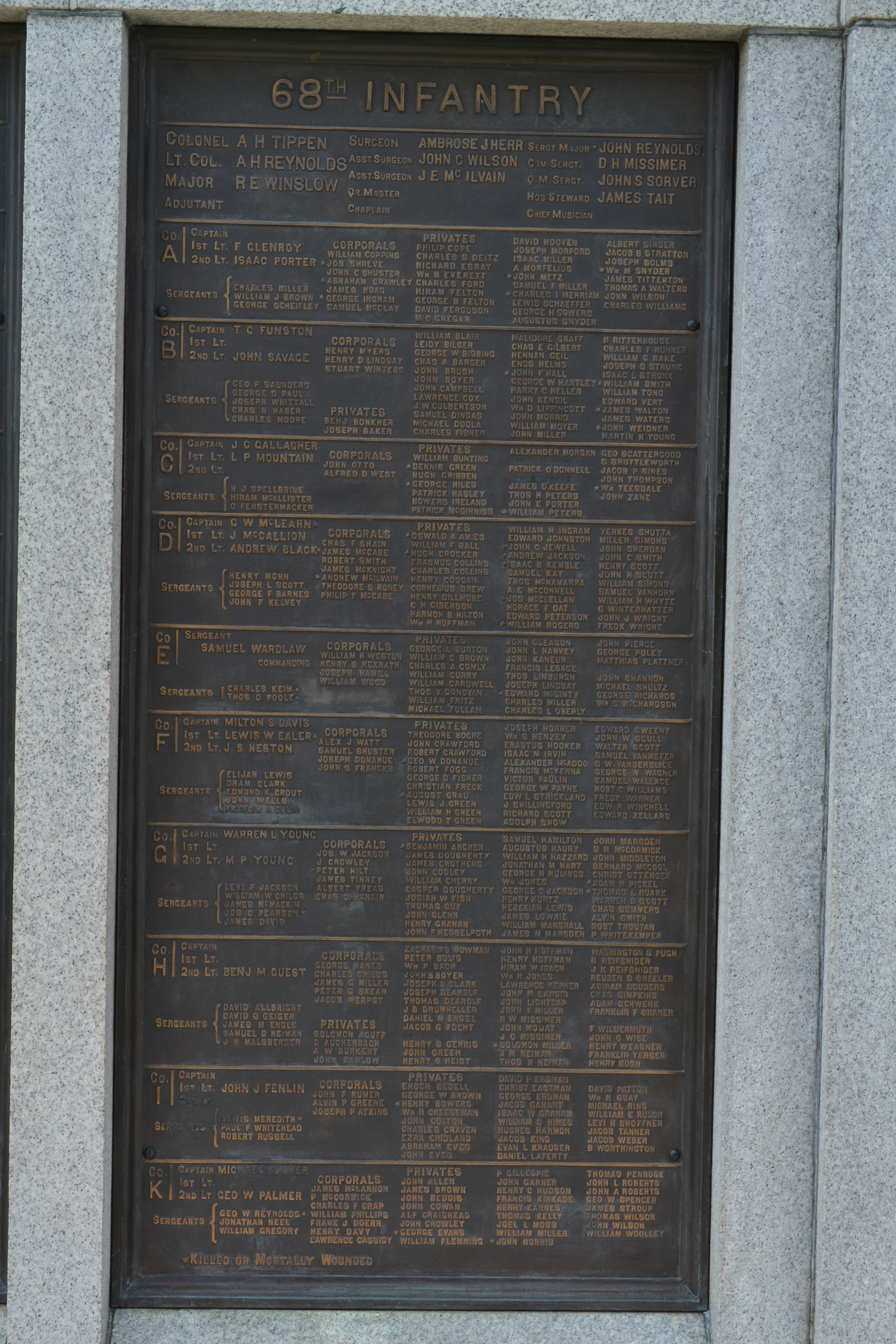
68th Infantry Regiment

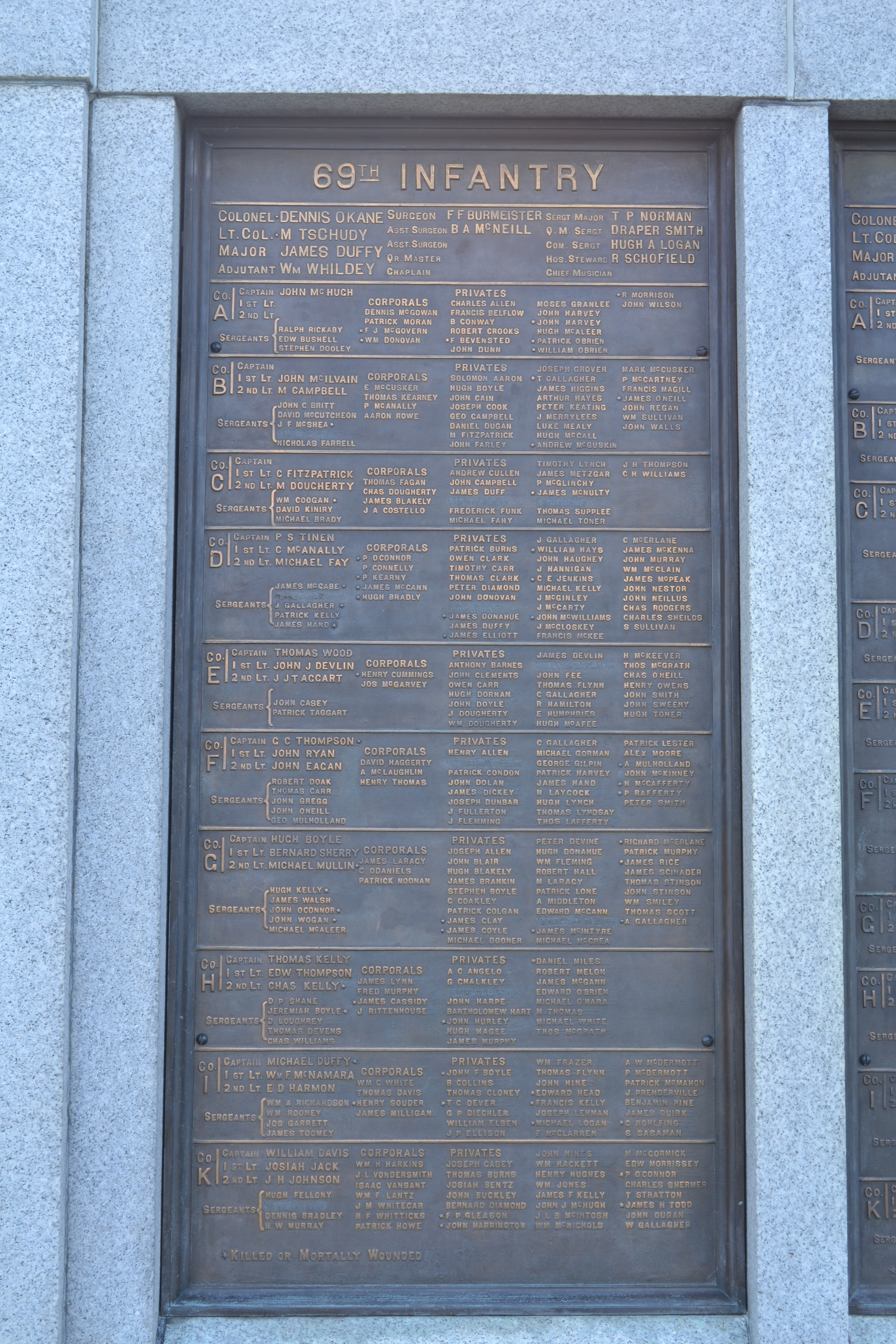
69th Infantry Regiment

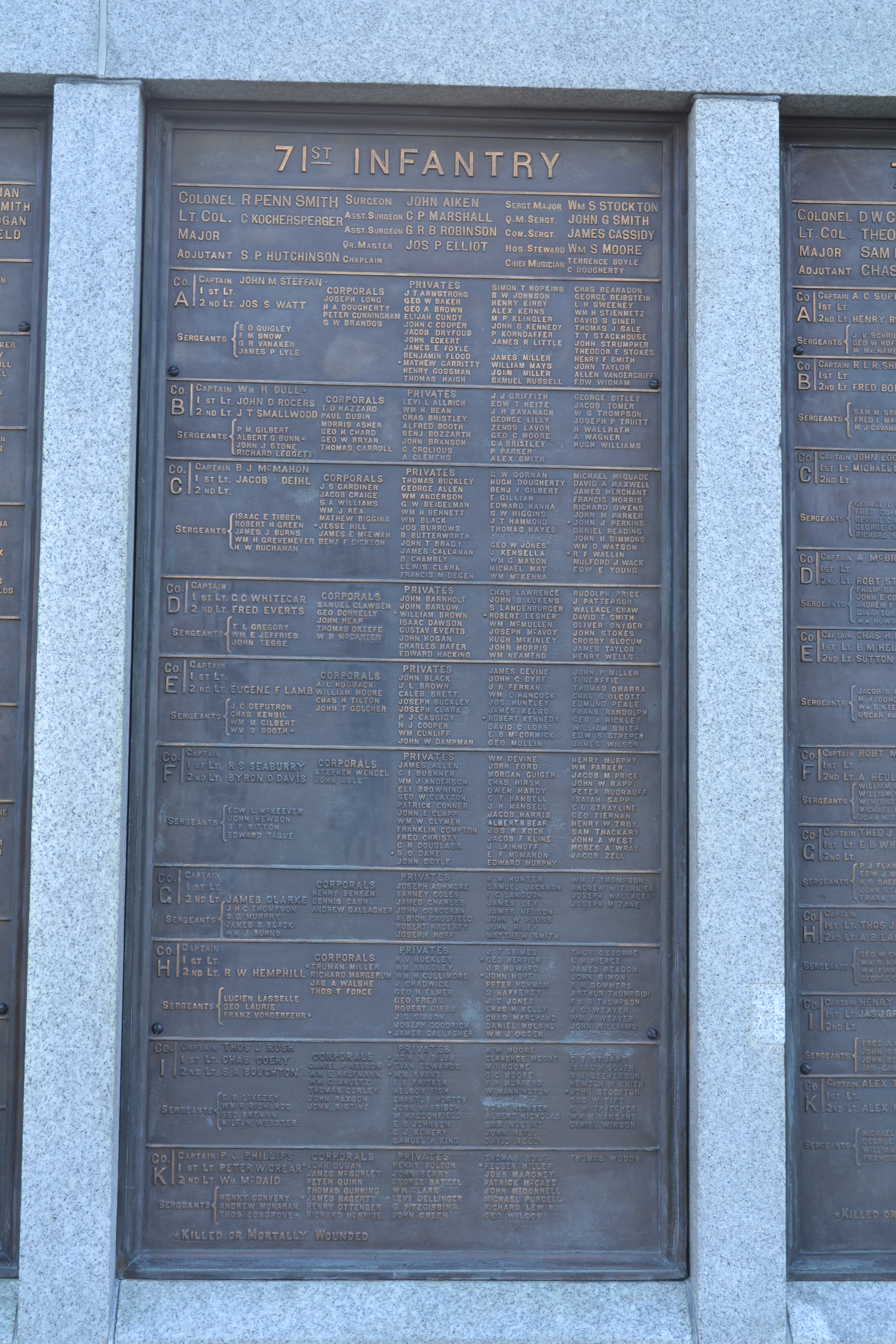
71st Infantry Regiment

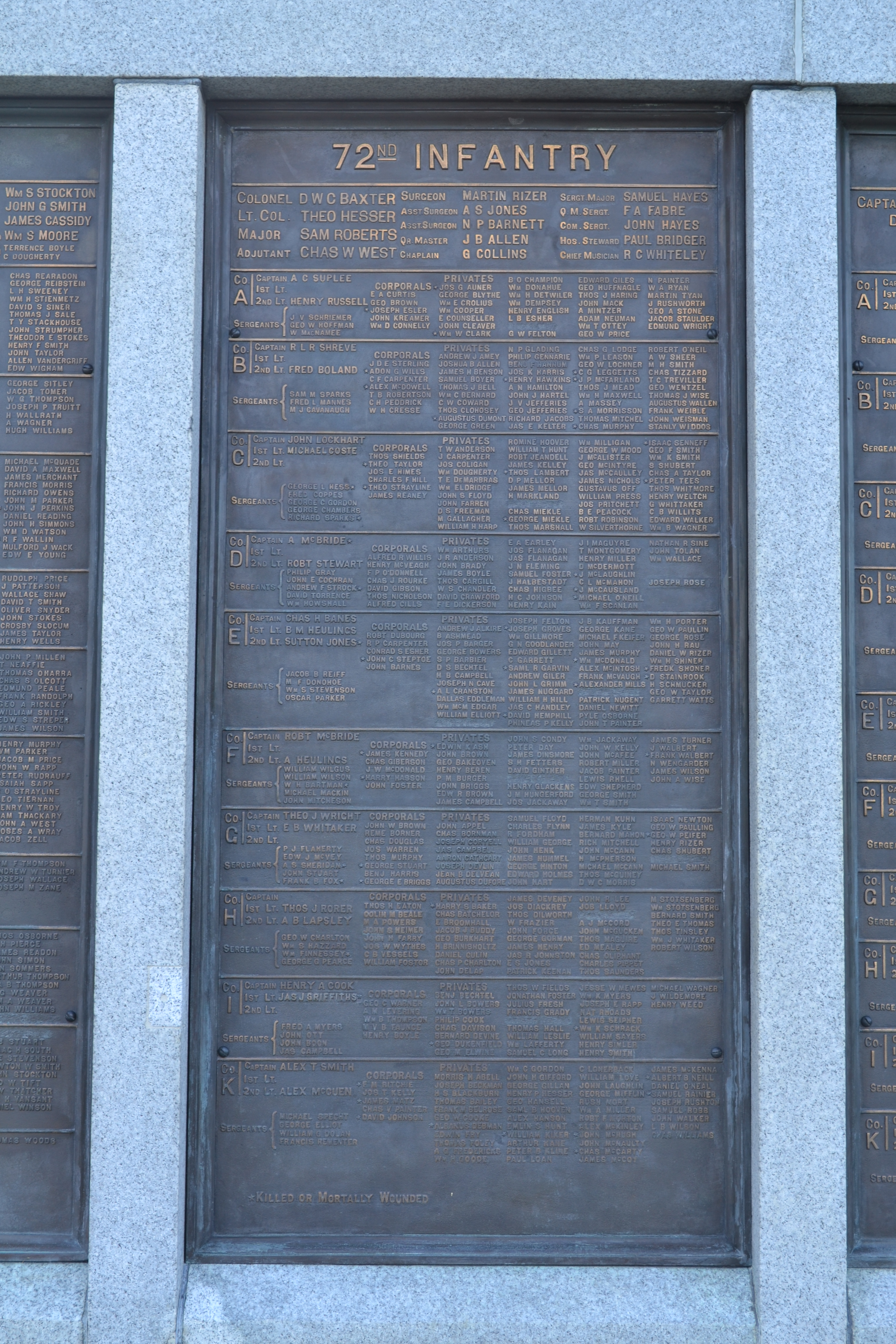
72nd Infantry Regiment

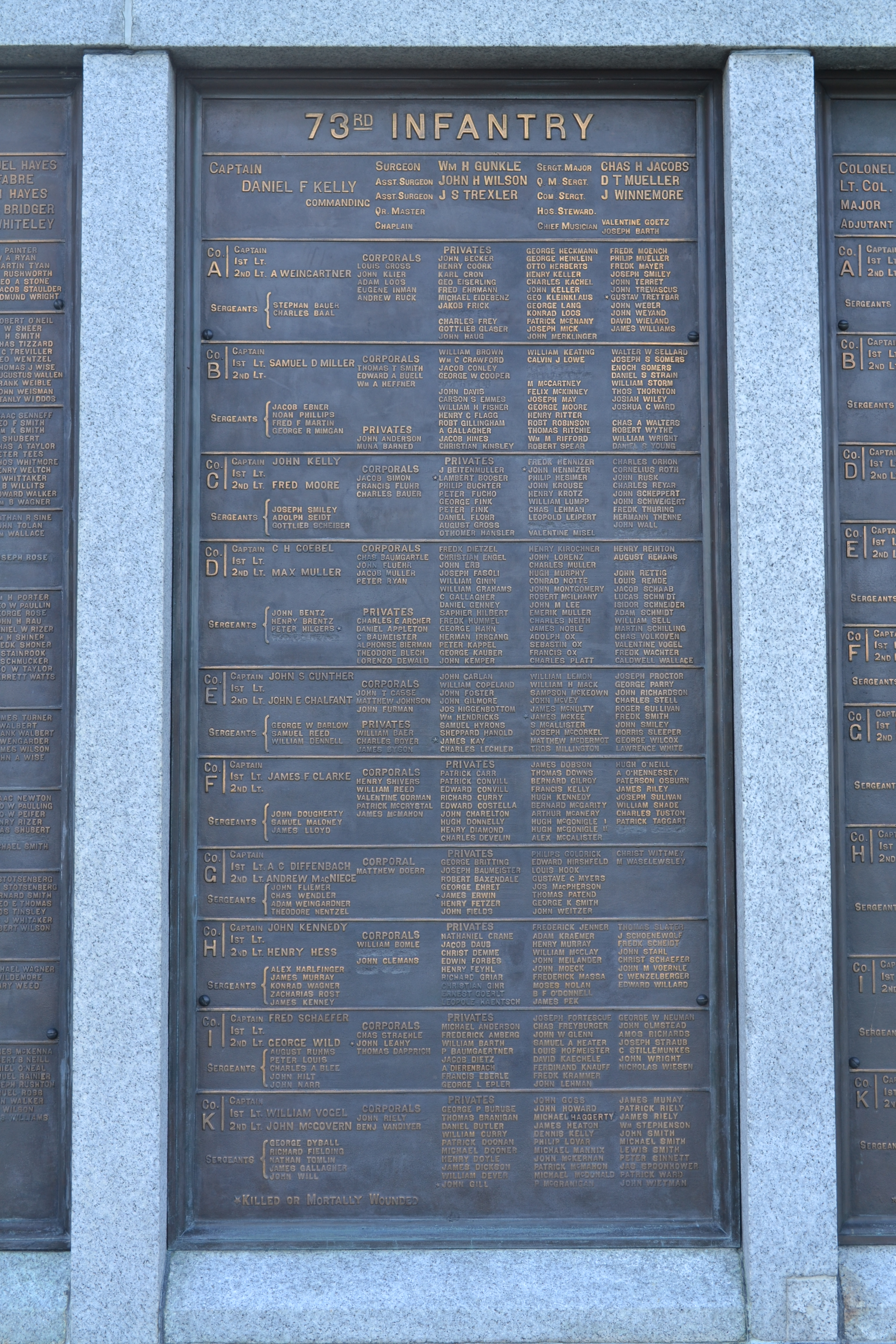
73rd Infantry Regiment

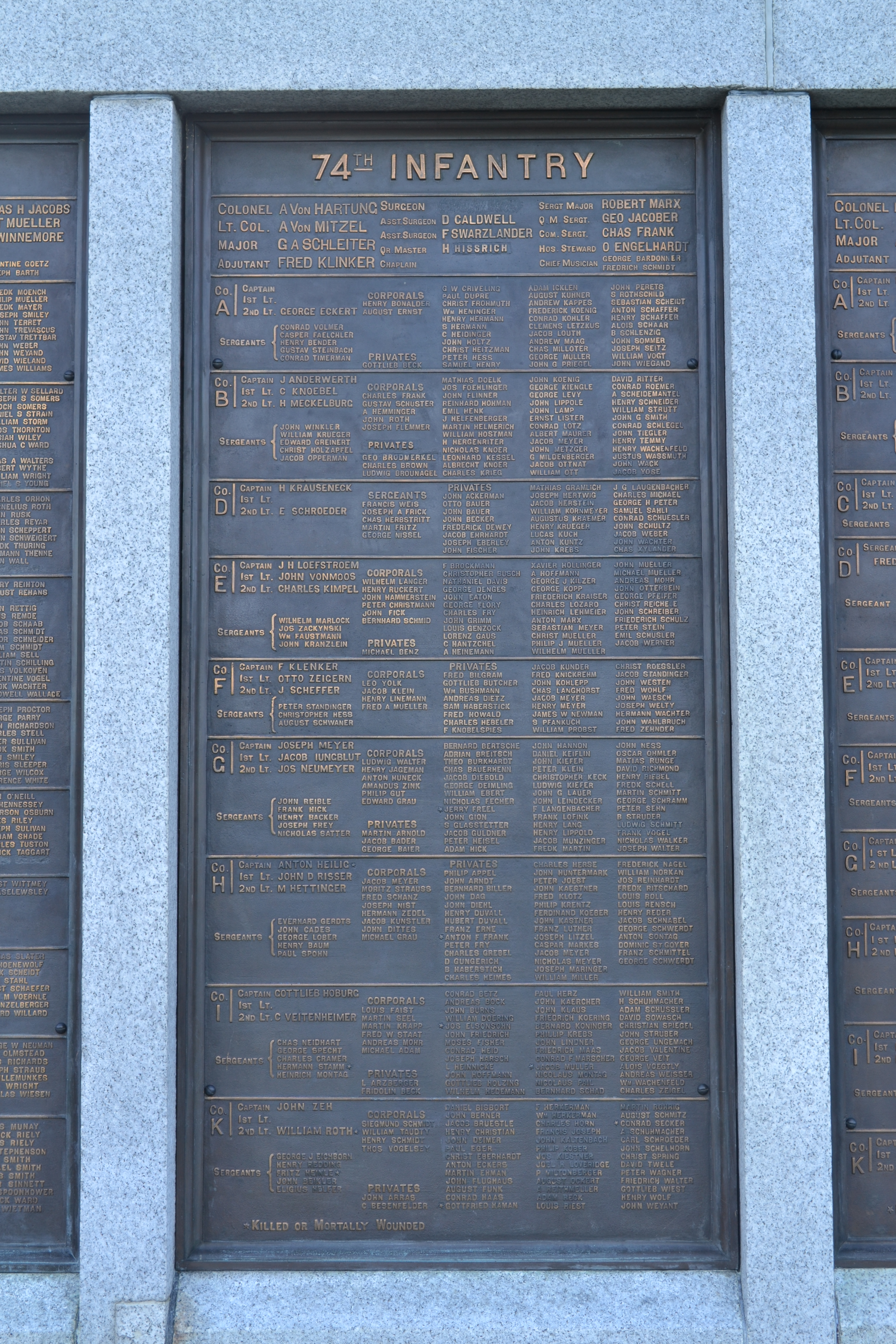
74th Infantry Regiment

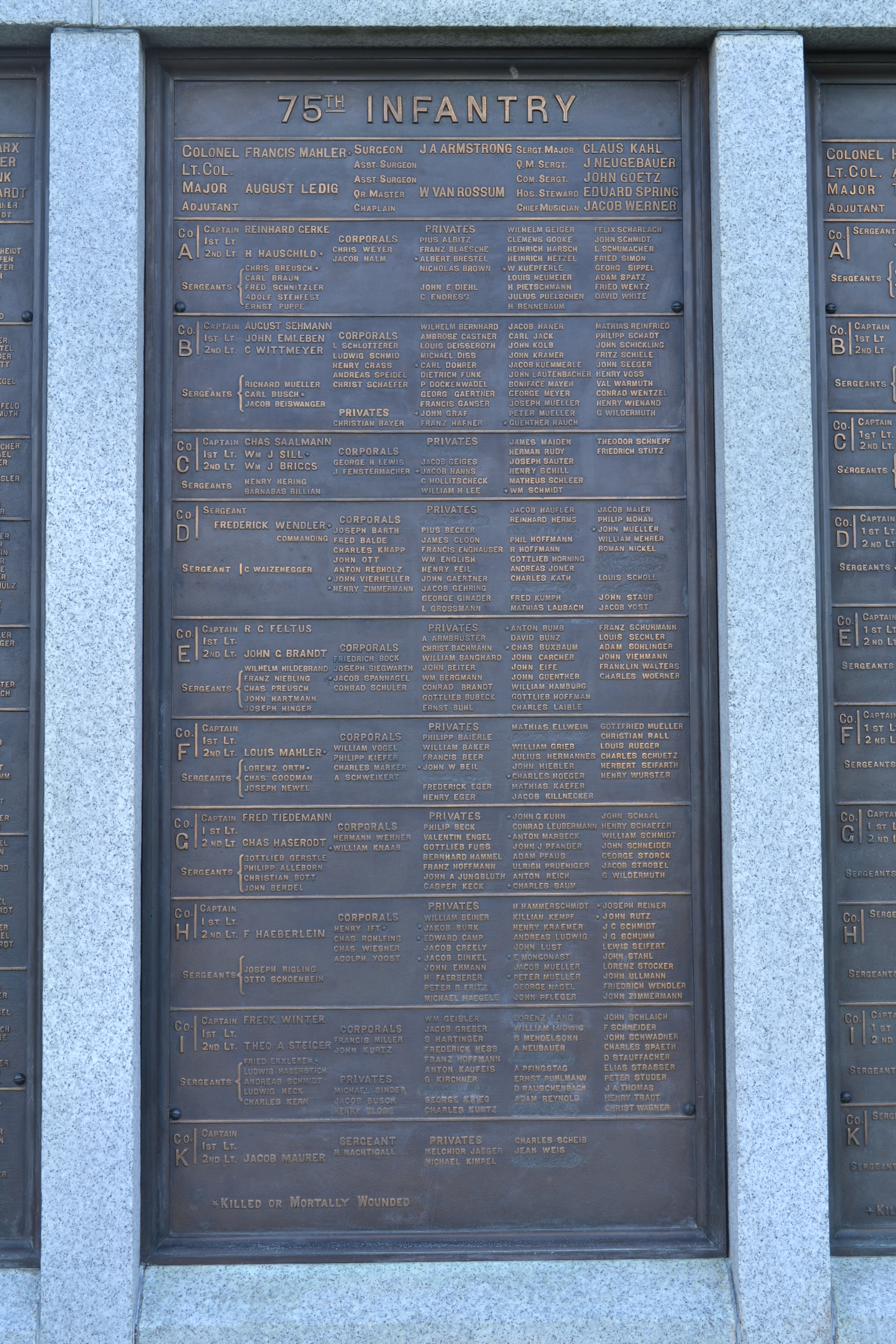
75th Infantry Regiment

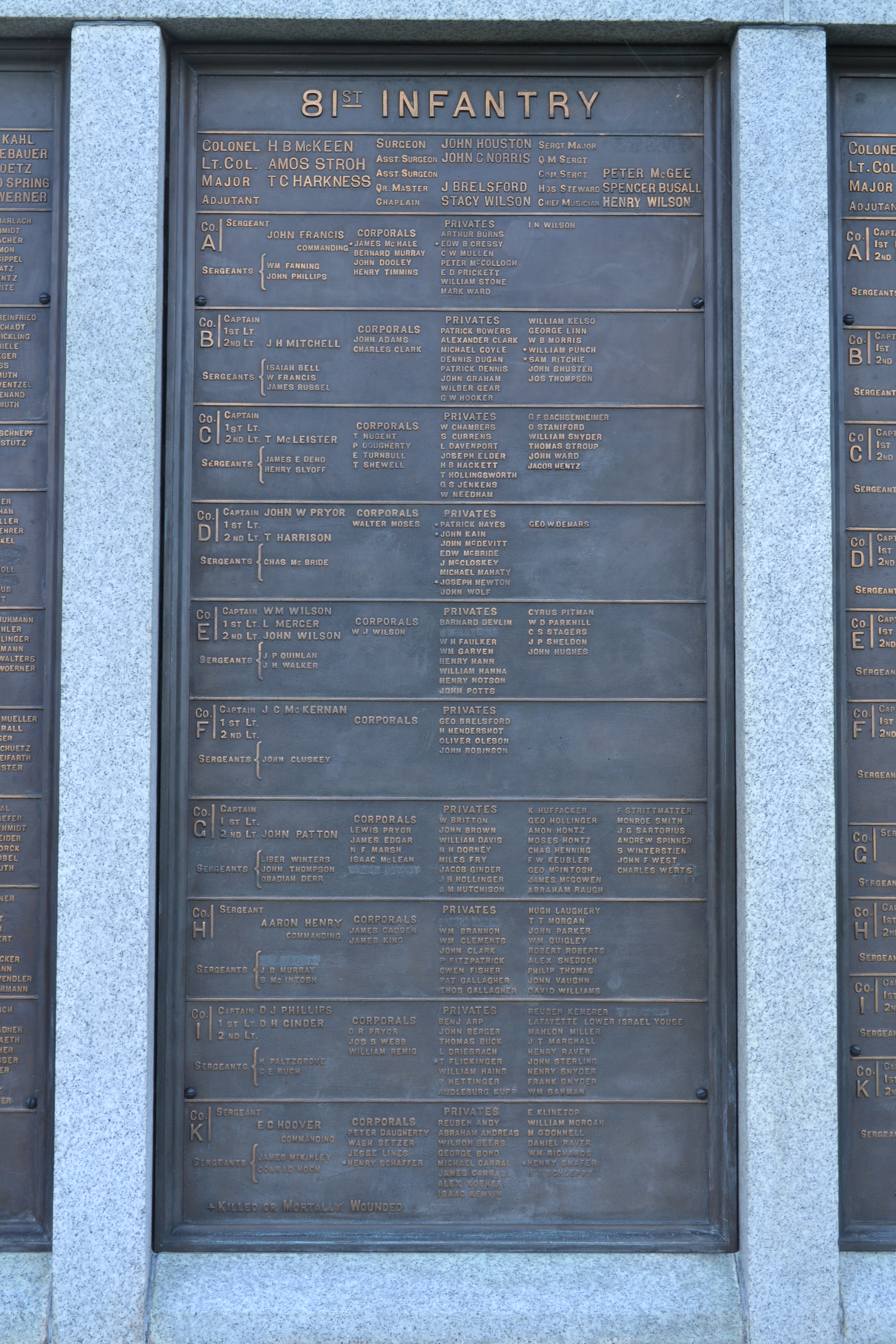
81st Infantry Regiment

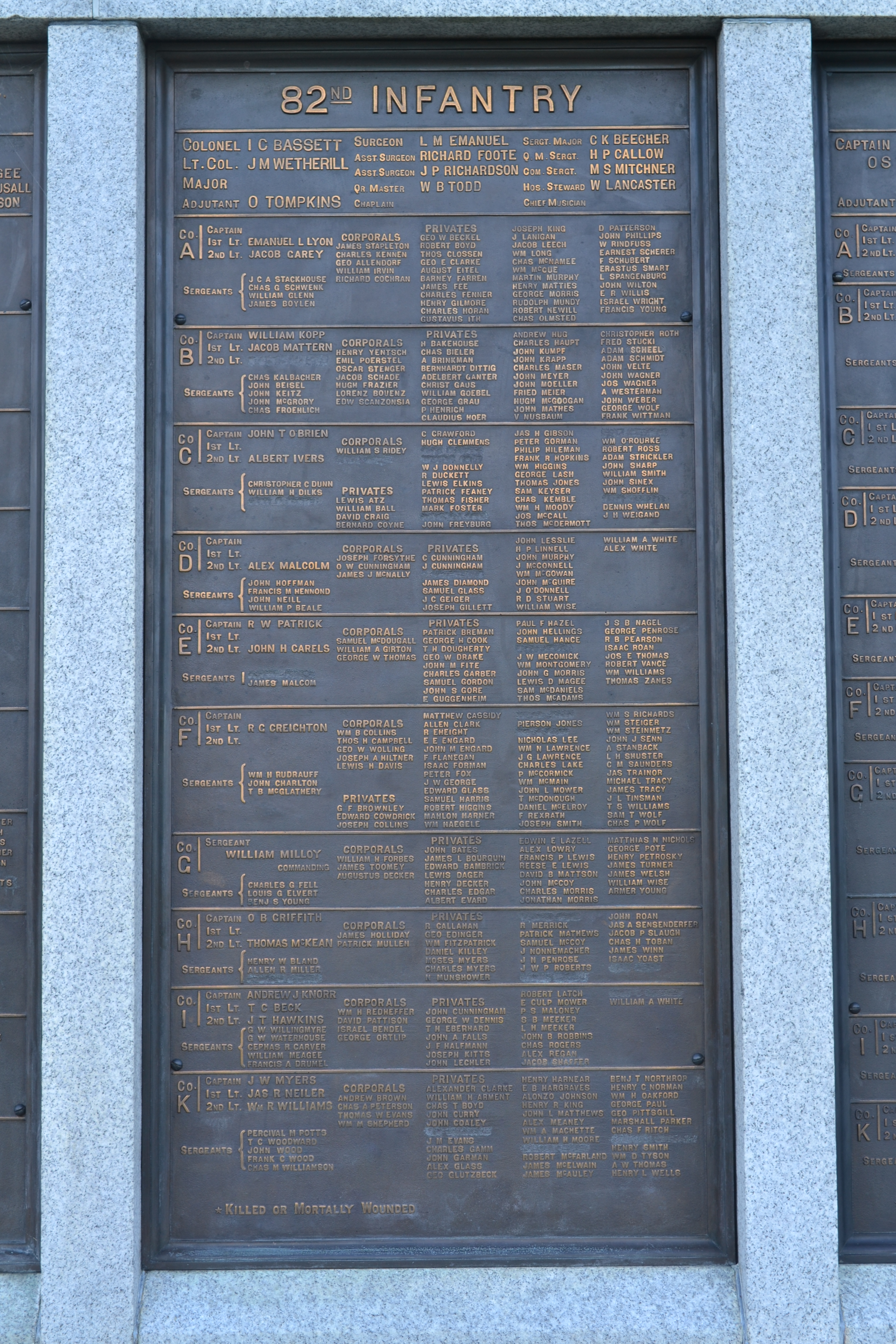
82nd Infantry Regiment

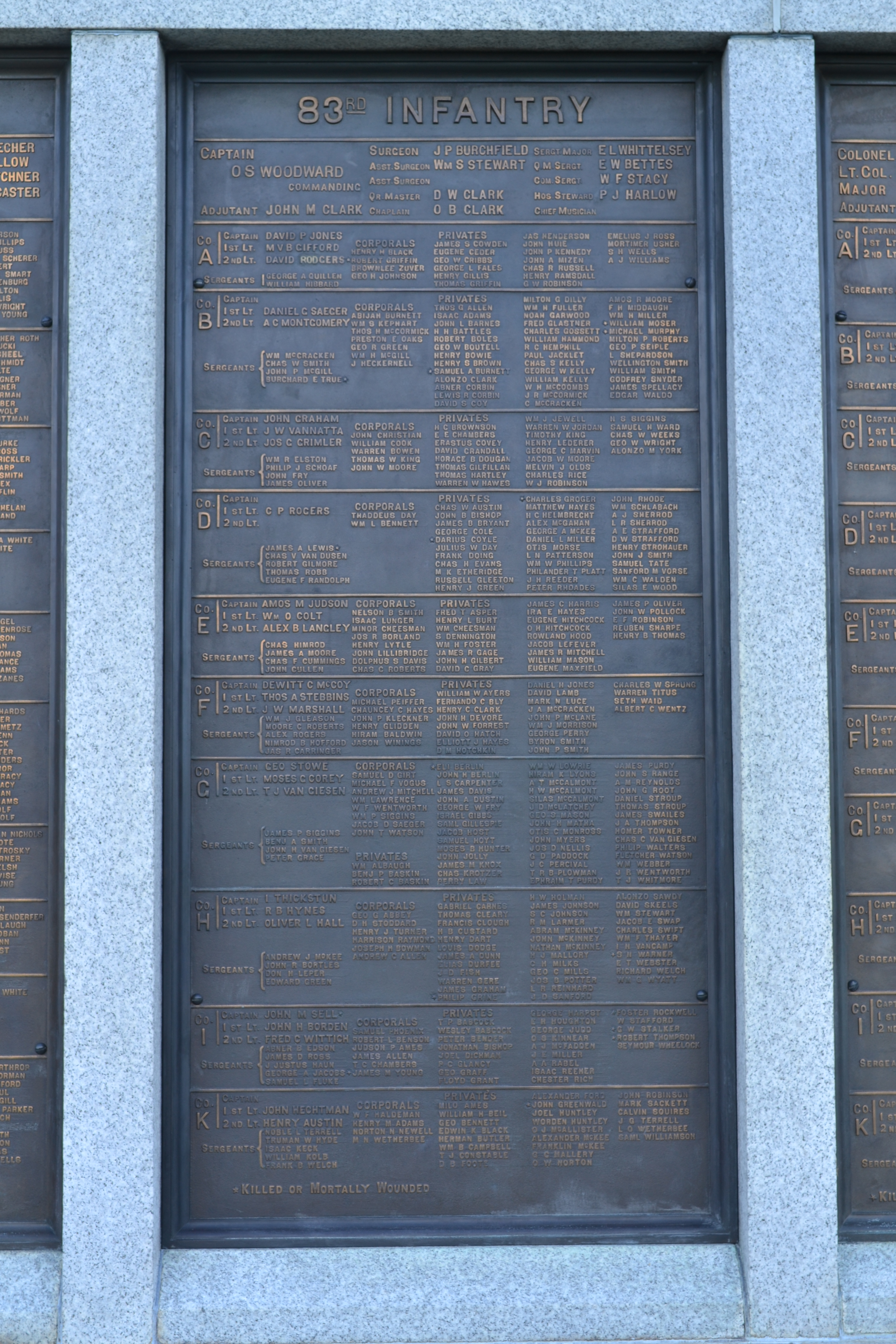
83rd Infantry Regiment

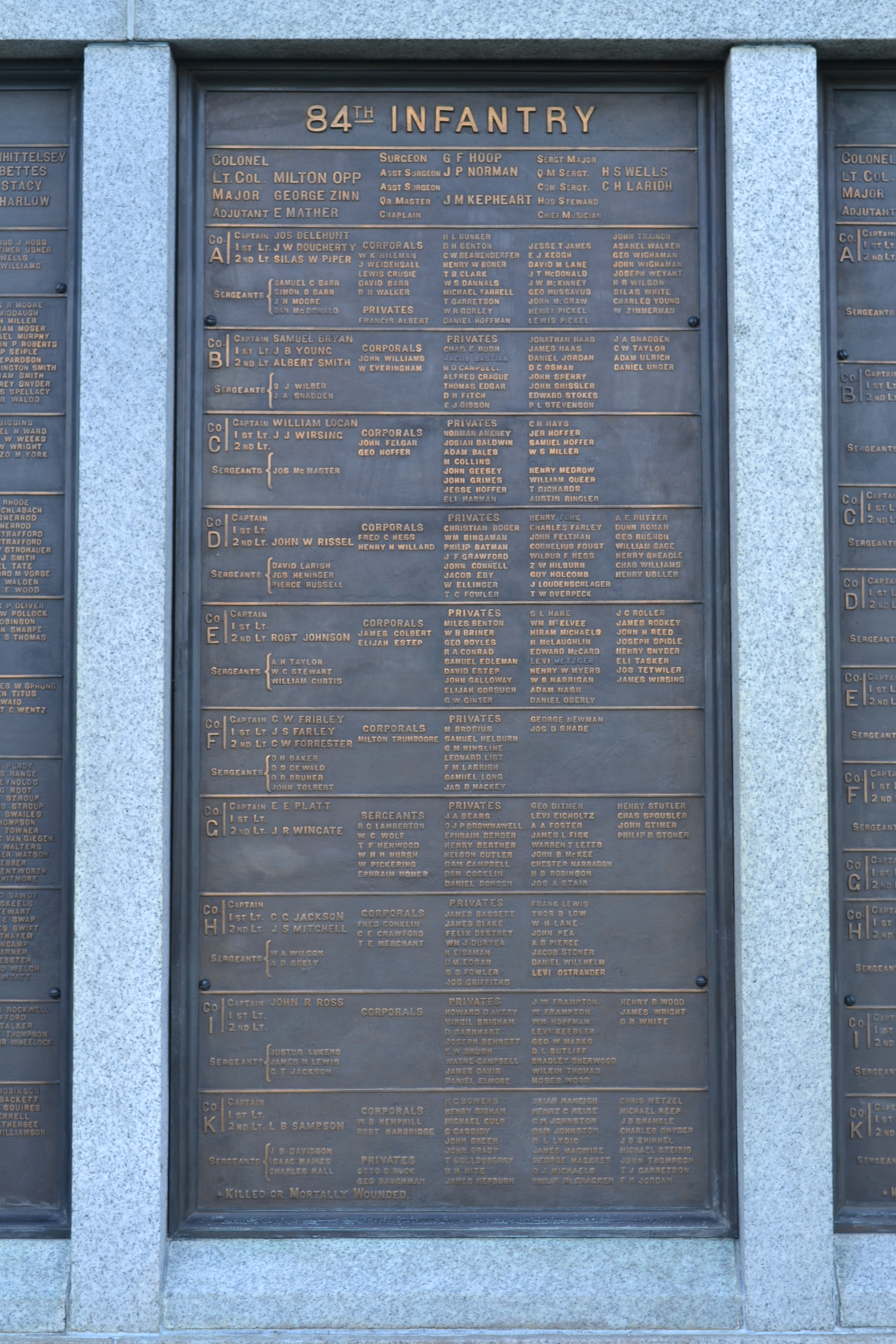
84th Infantry Regiment

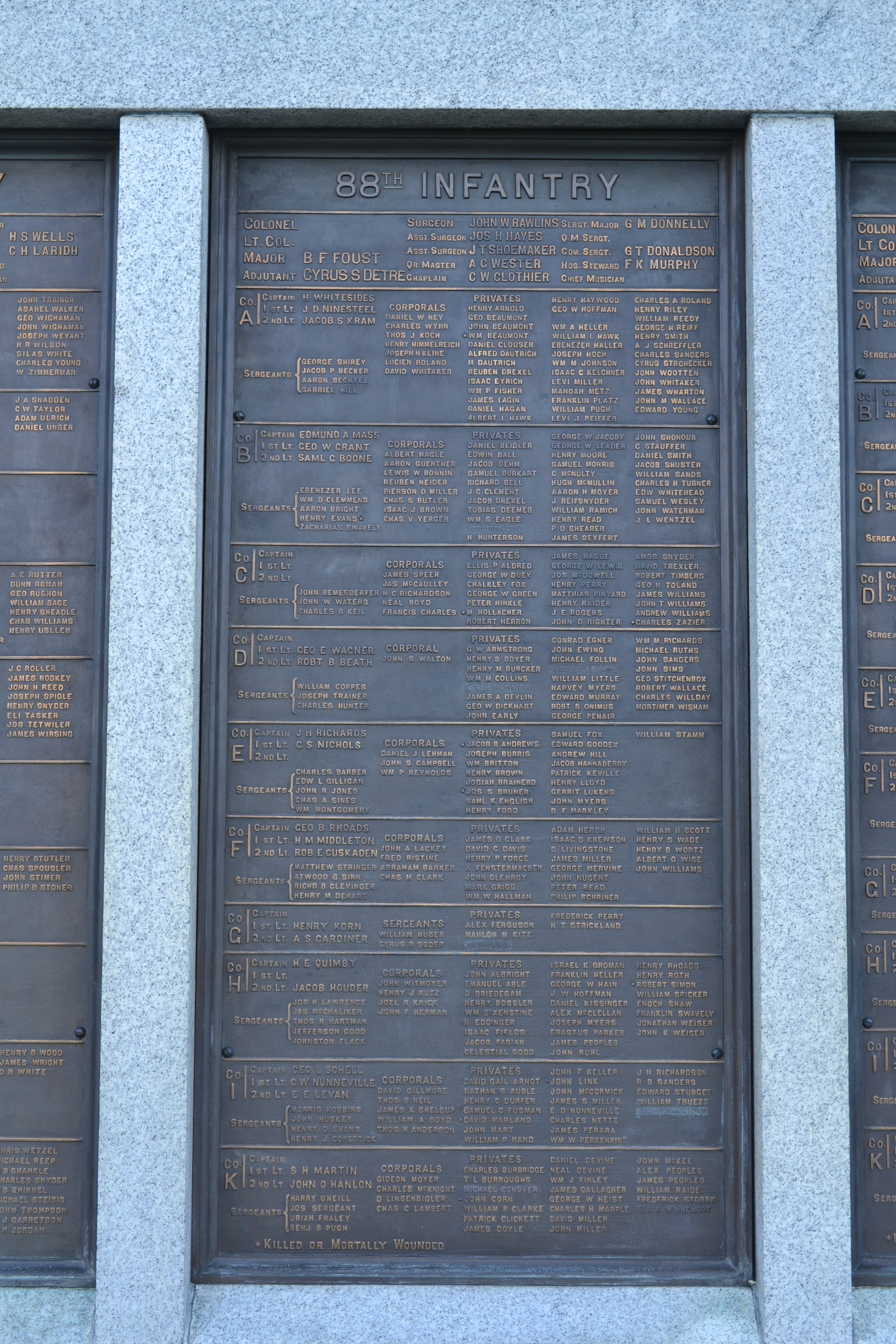
88th Infantry Regiment

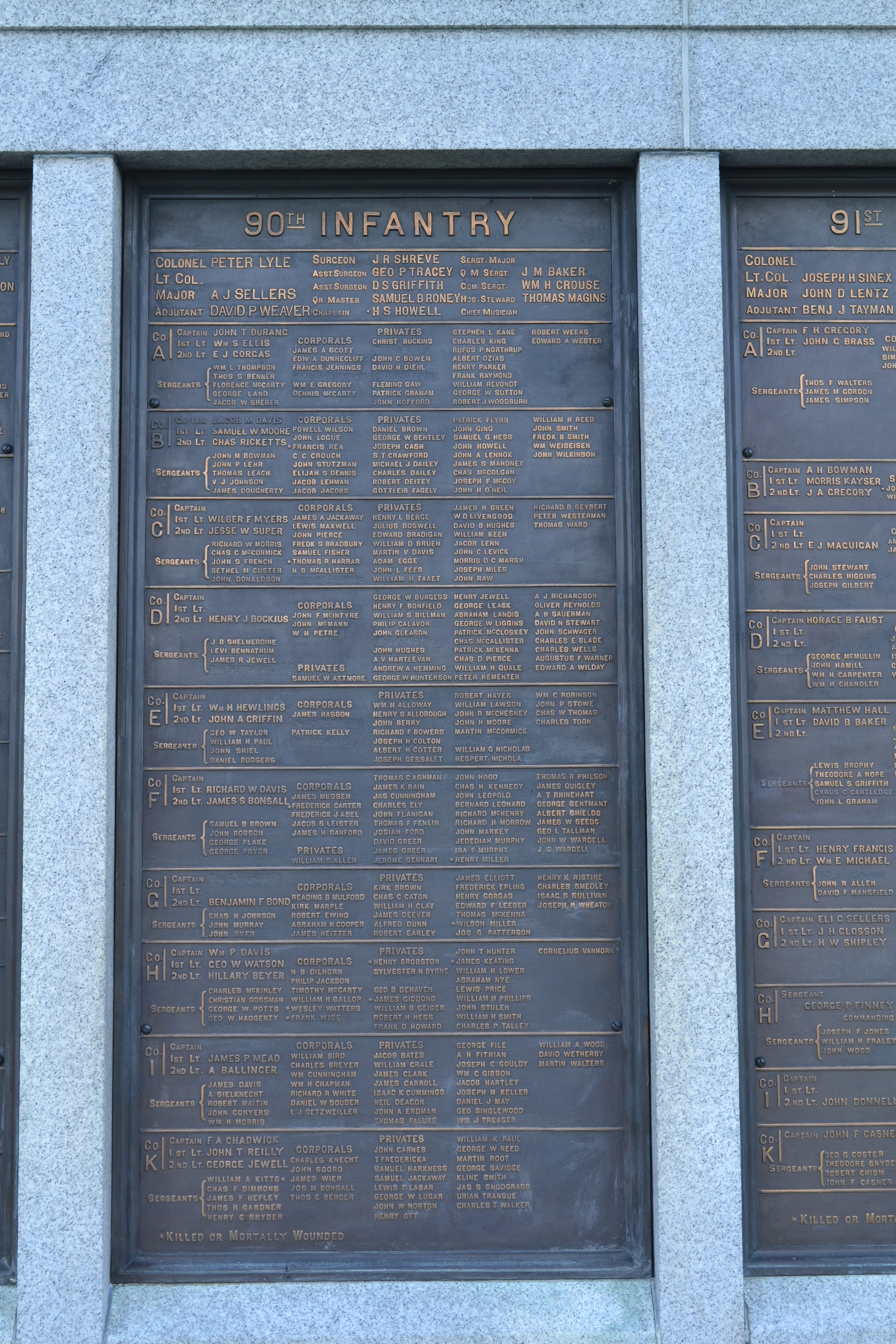
90th Infantry Regiment

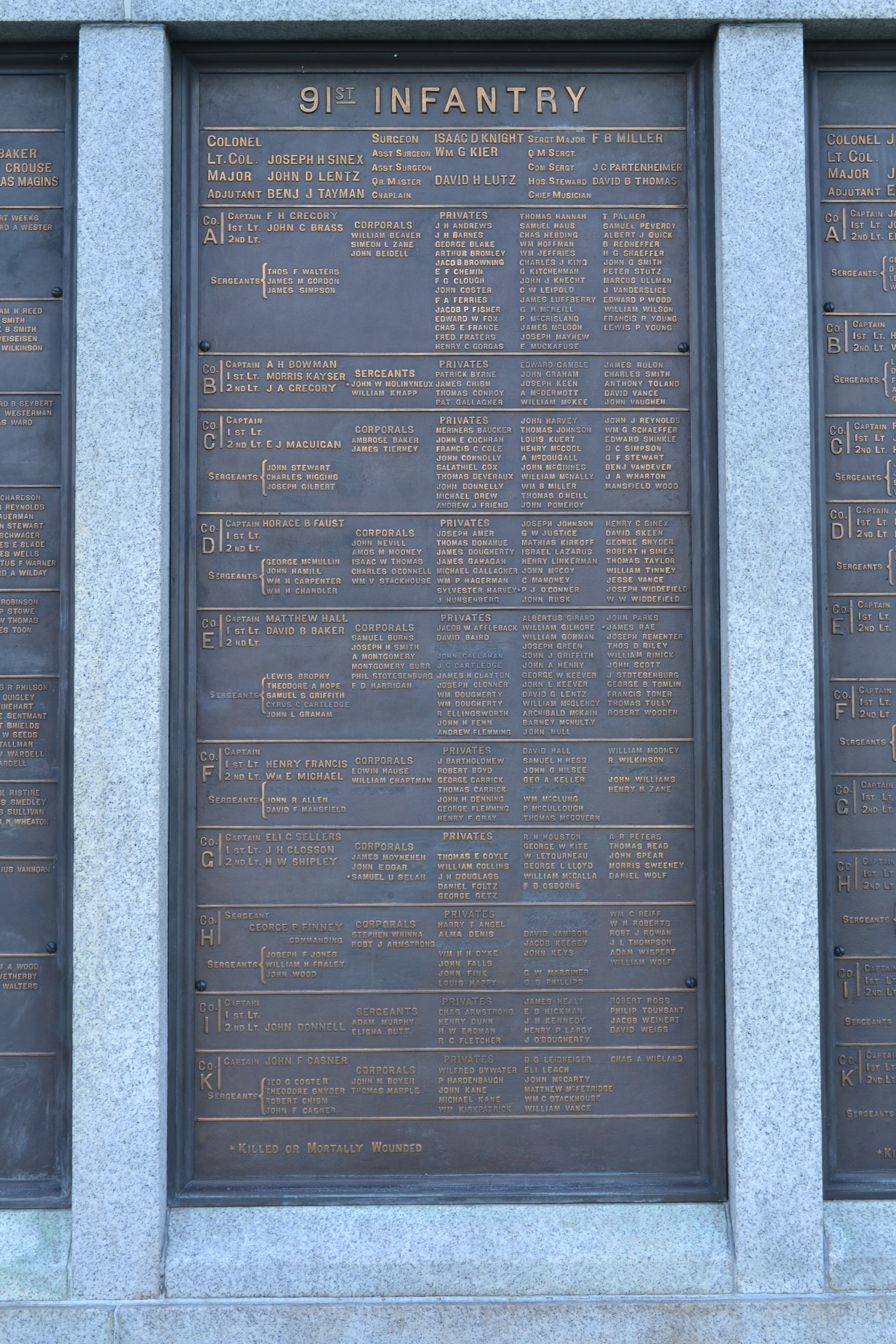
91st Infantry Regiment

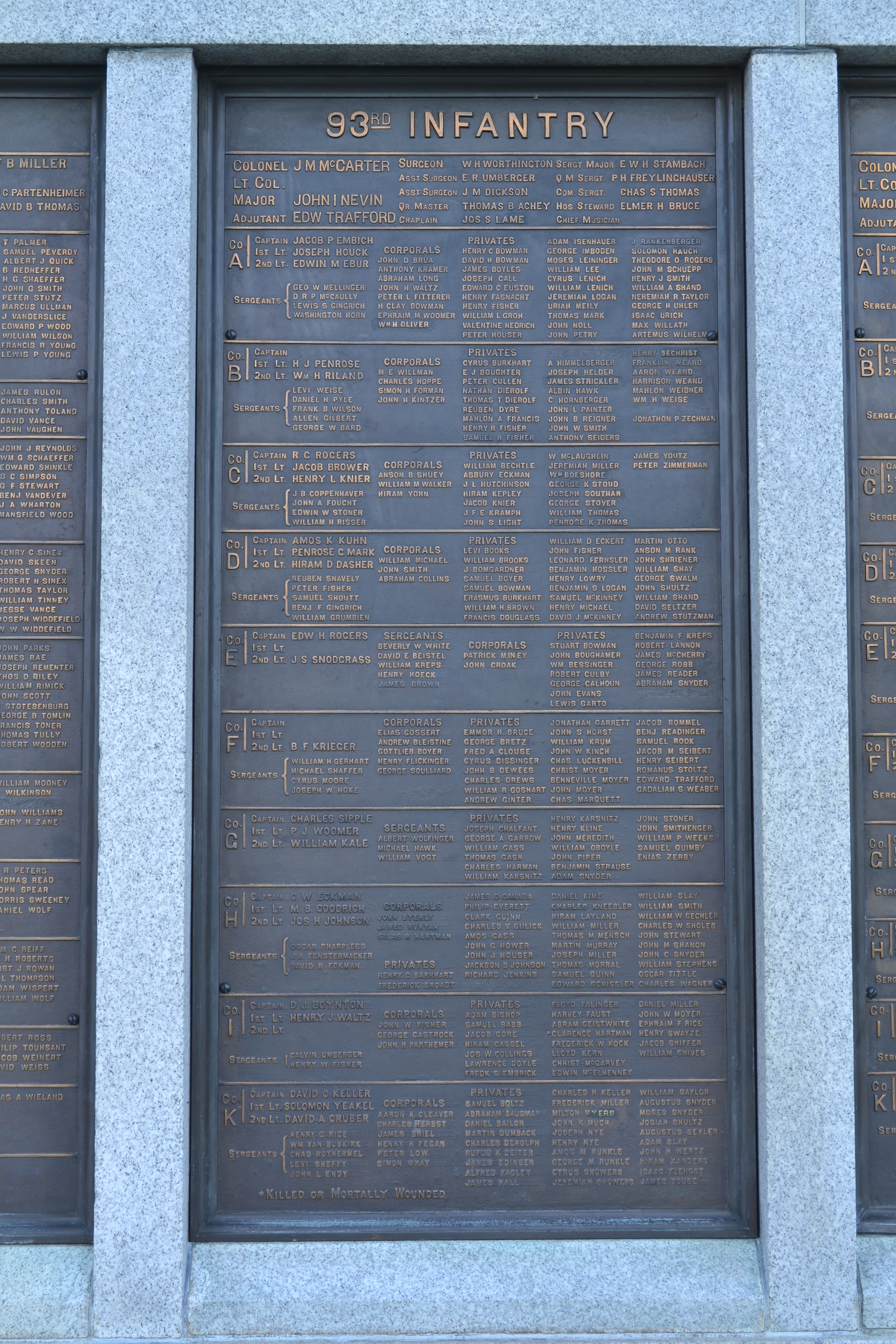
93rd Infantry Regiment

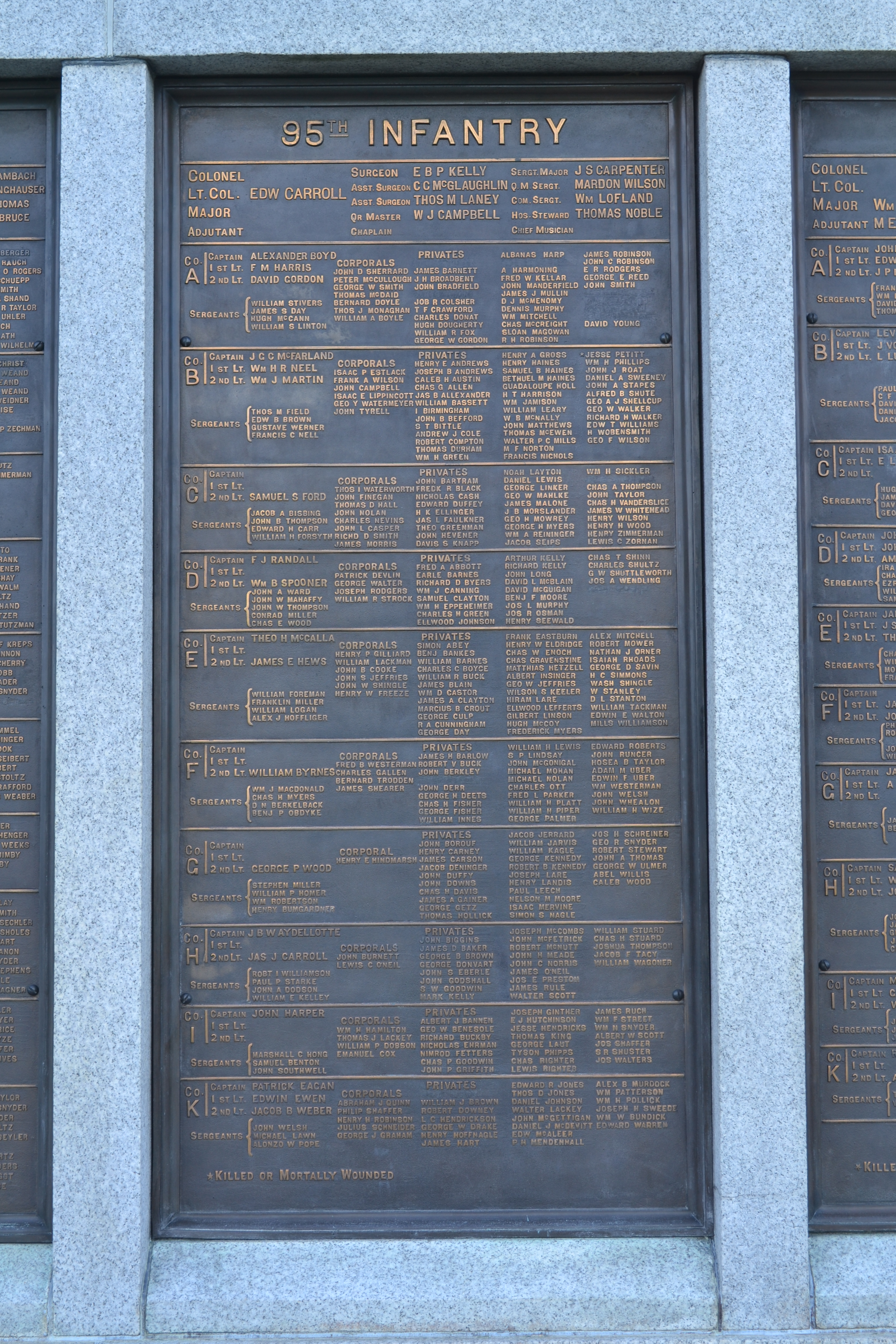
95th Infantry Regiment

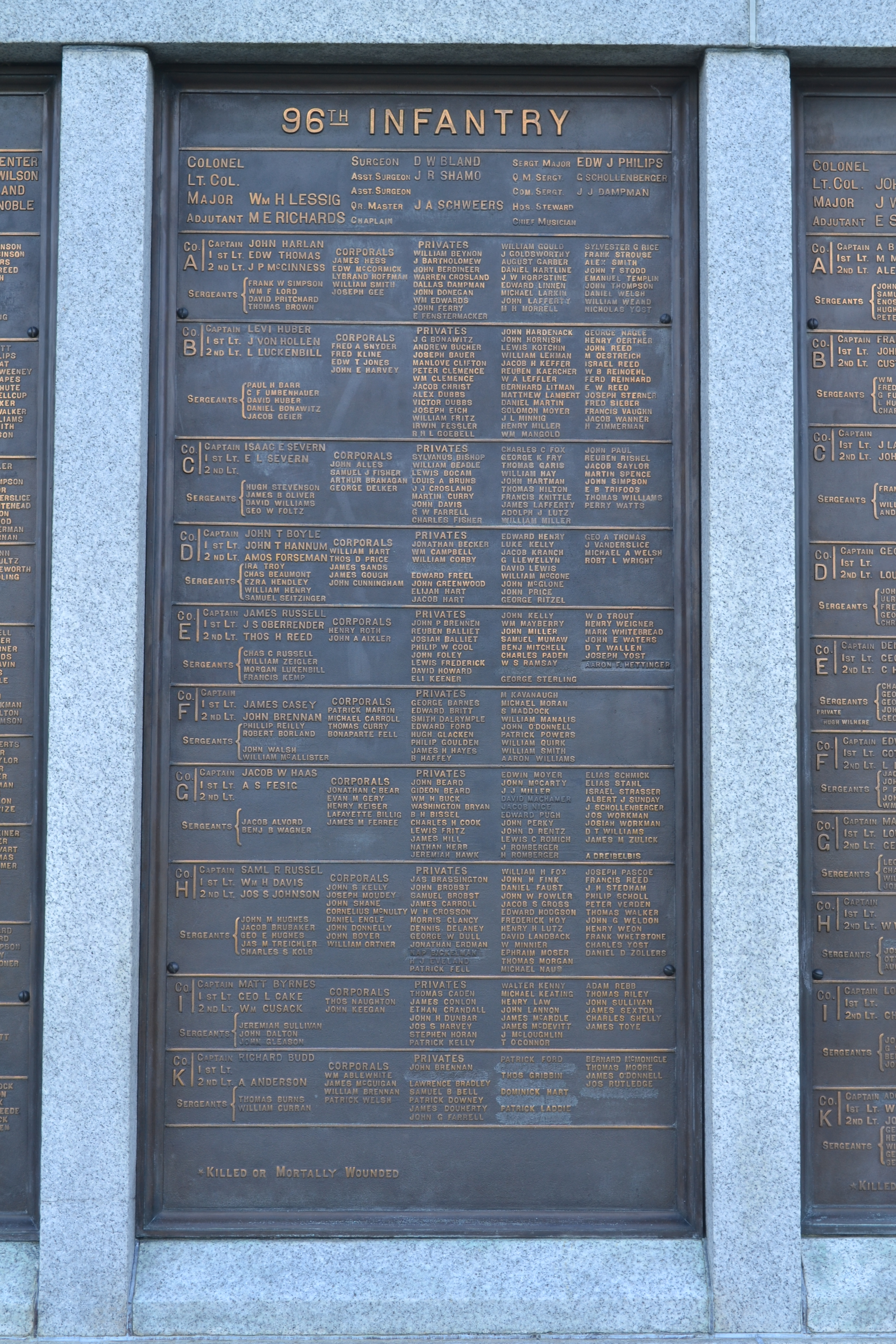
96th Infantry Regiment

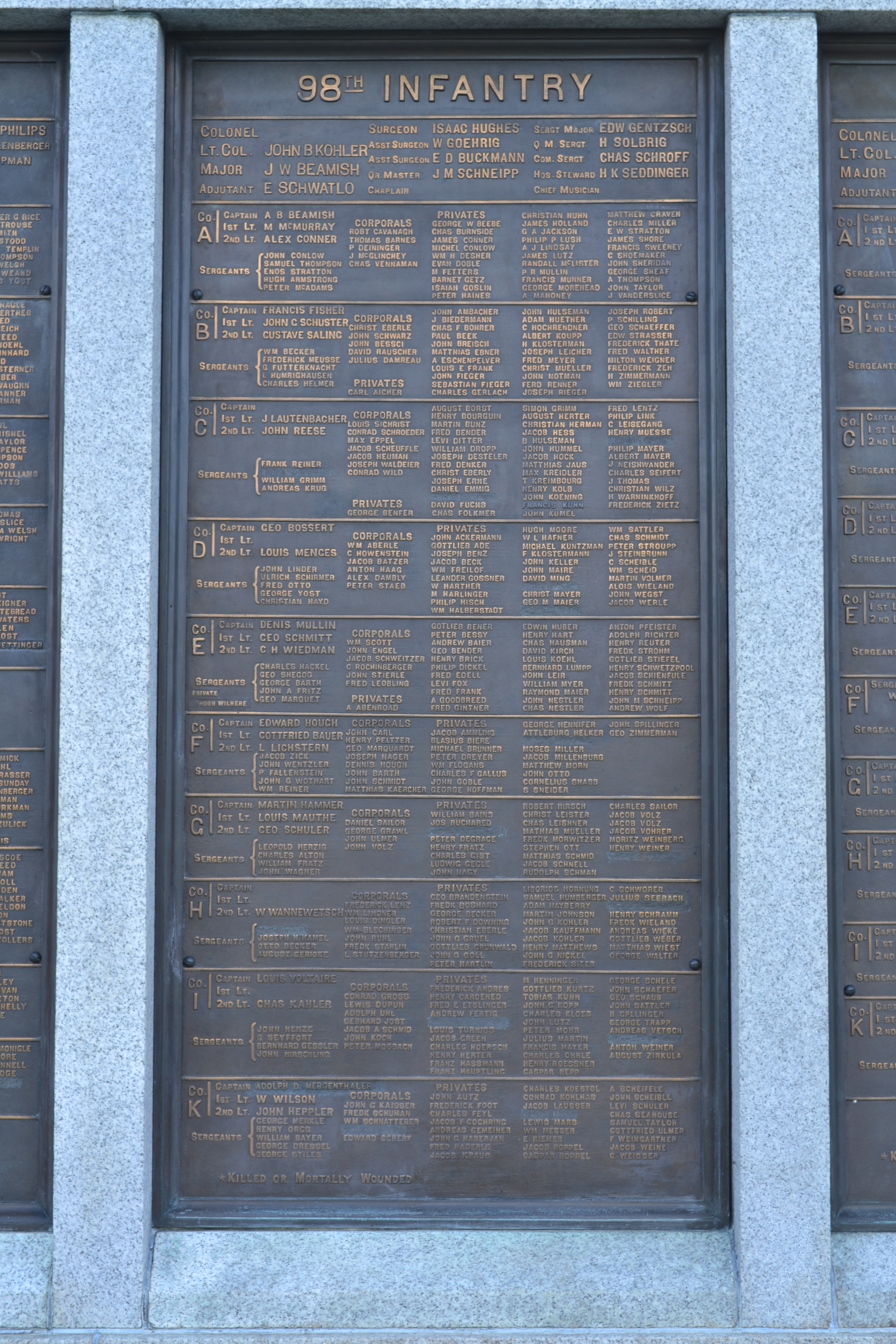
98th Infantry Regiment

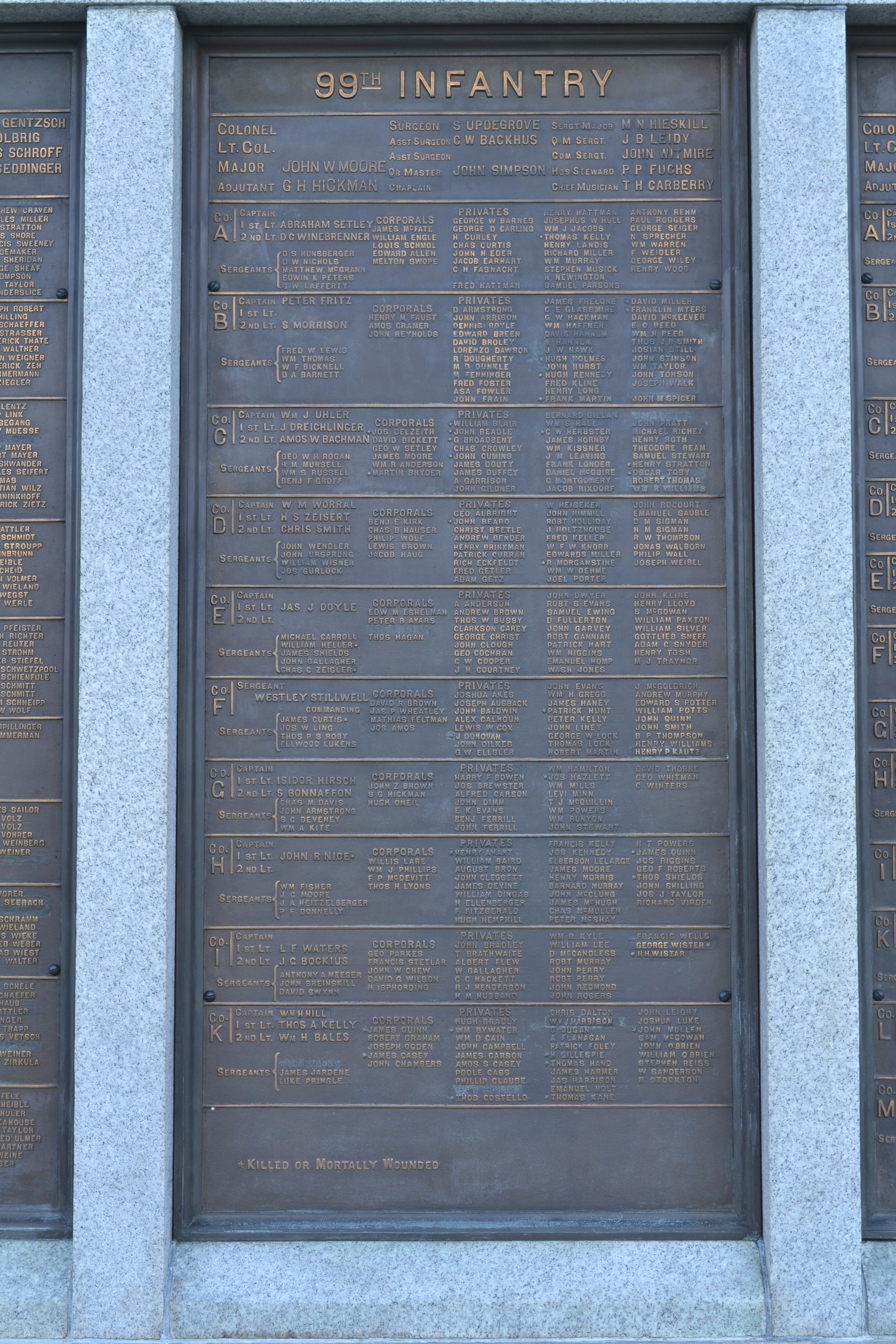
99th Infantry Regiment

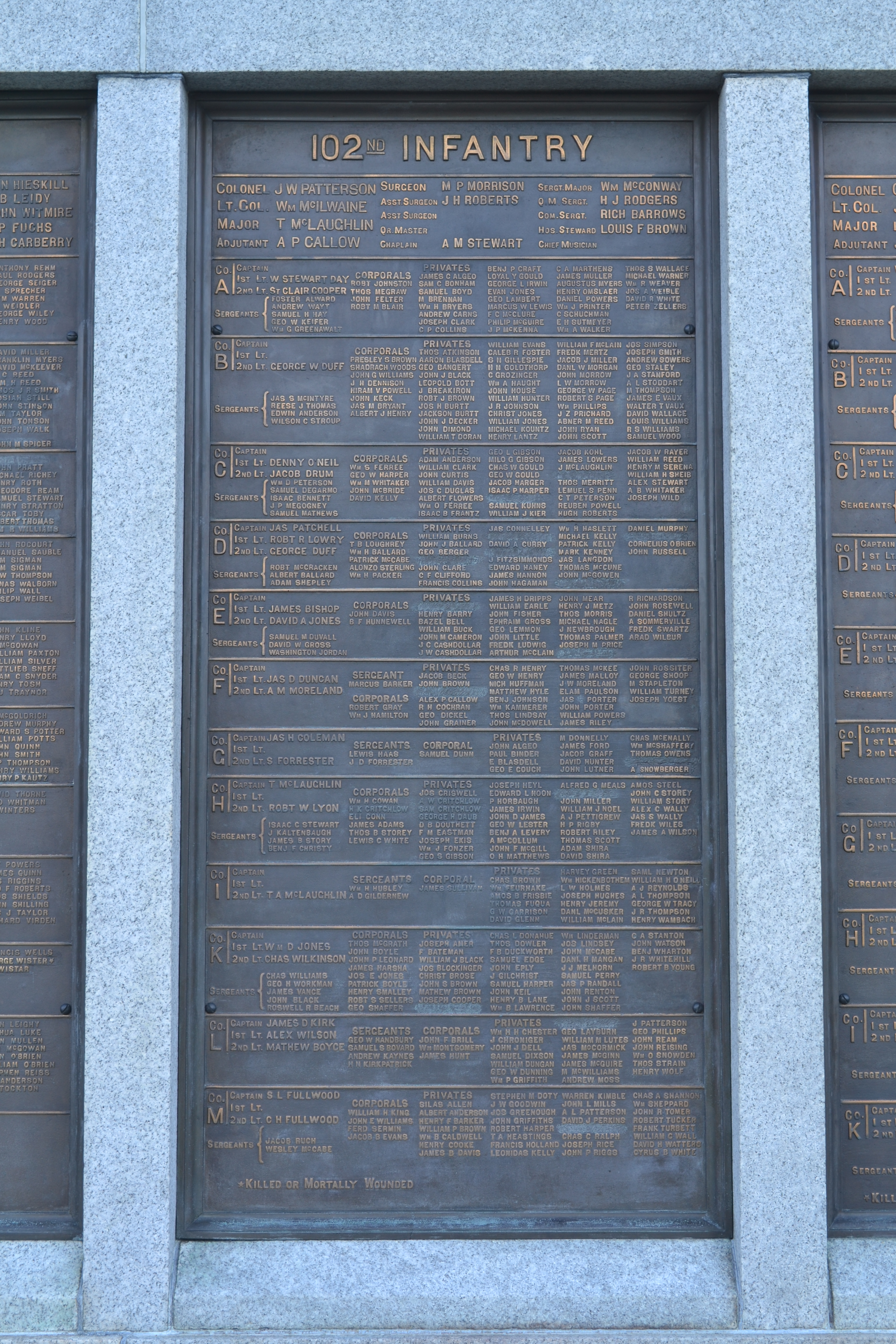
102nd Infantry Regiment

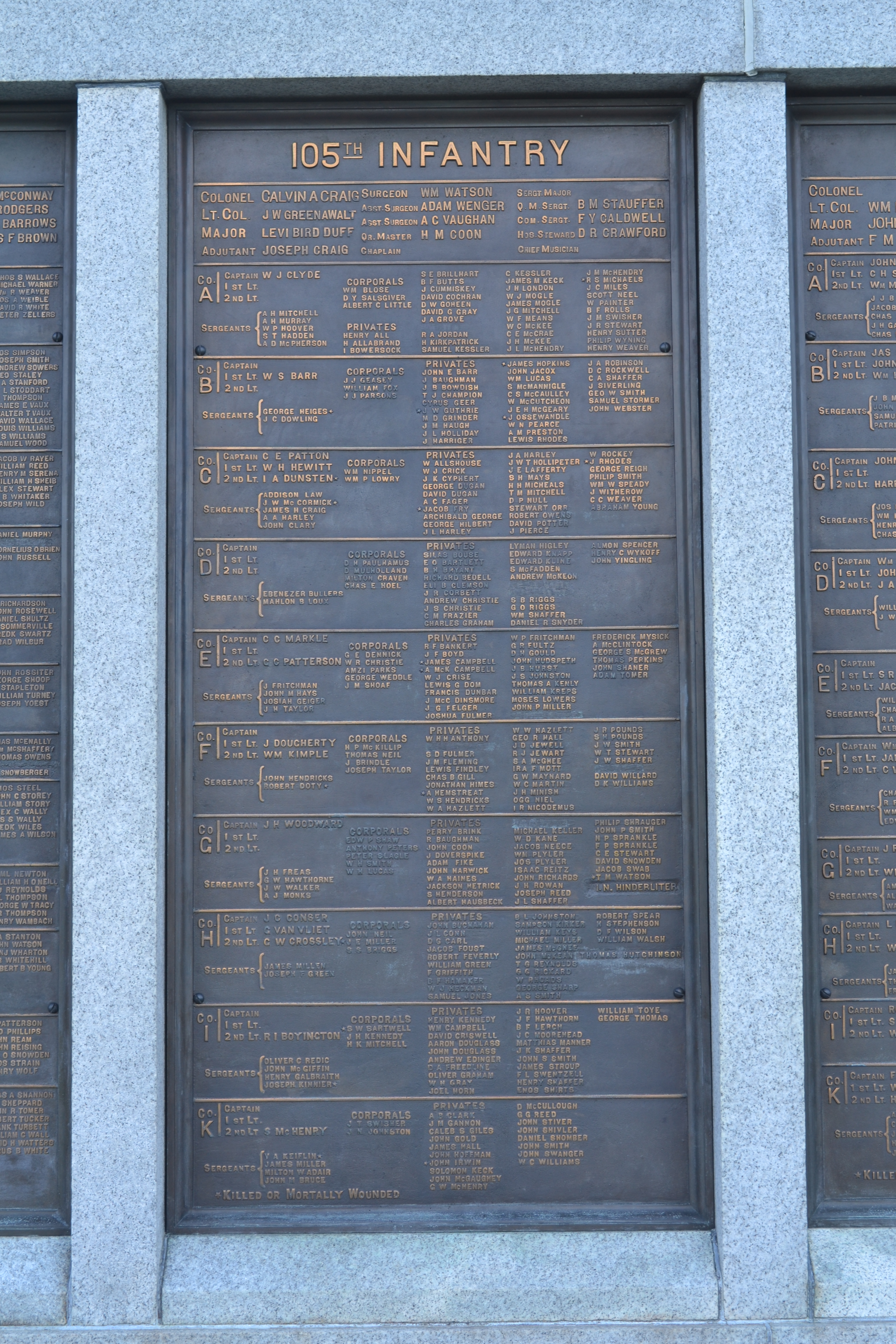
105th Infantry Regiment

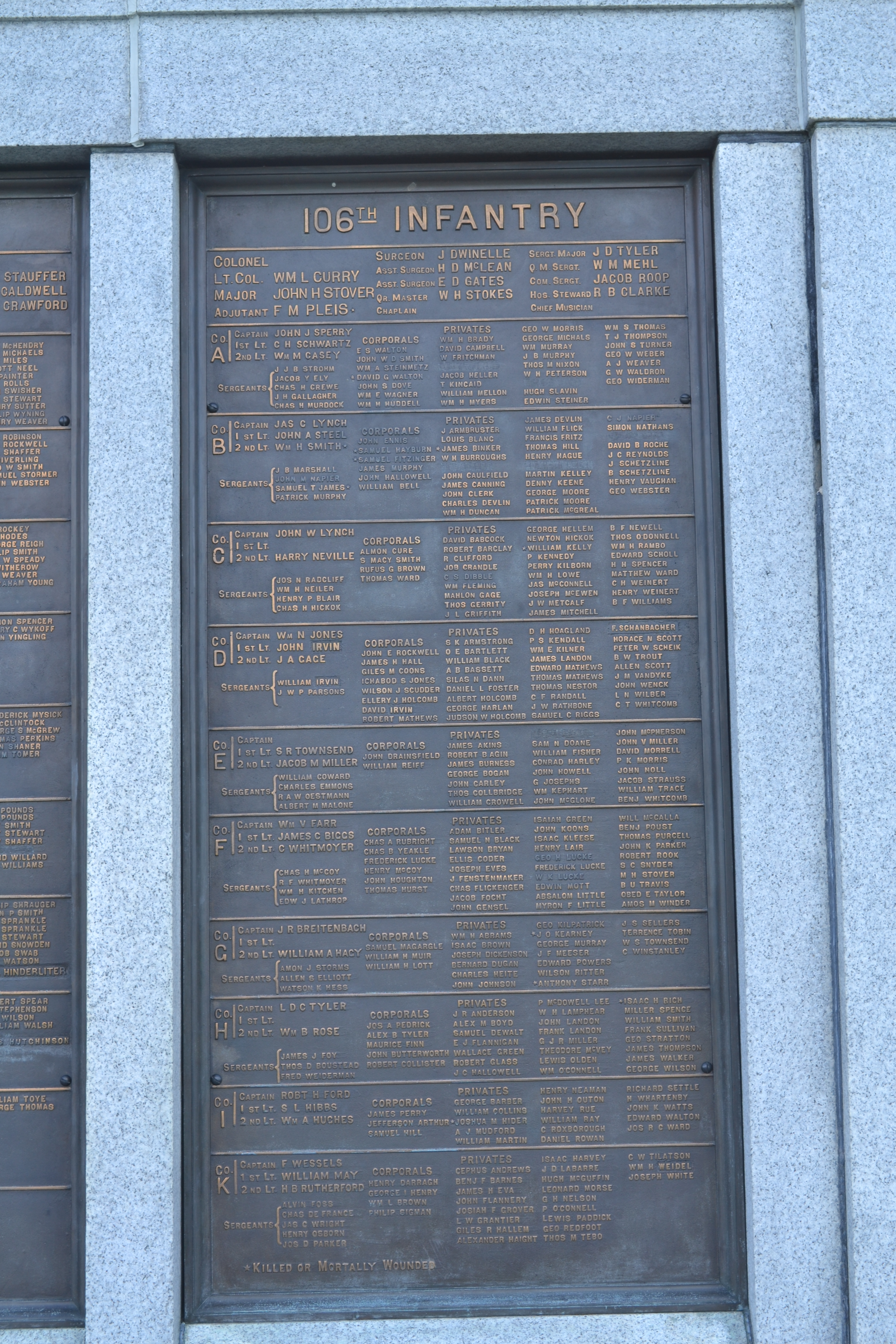
106th Infantry Regiment

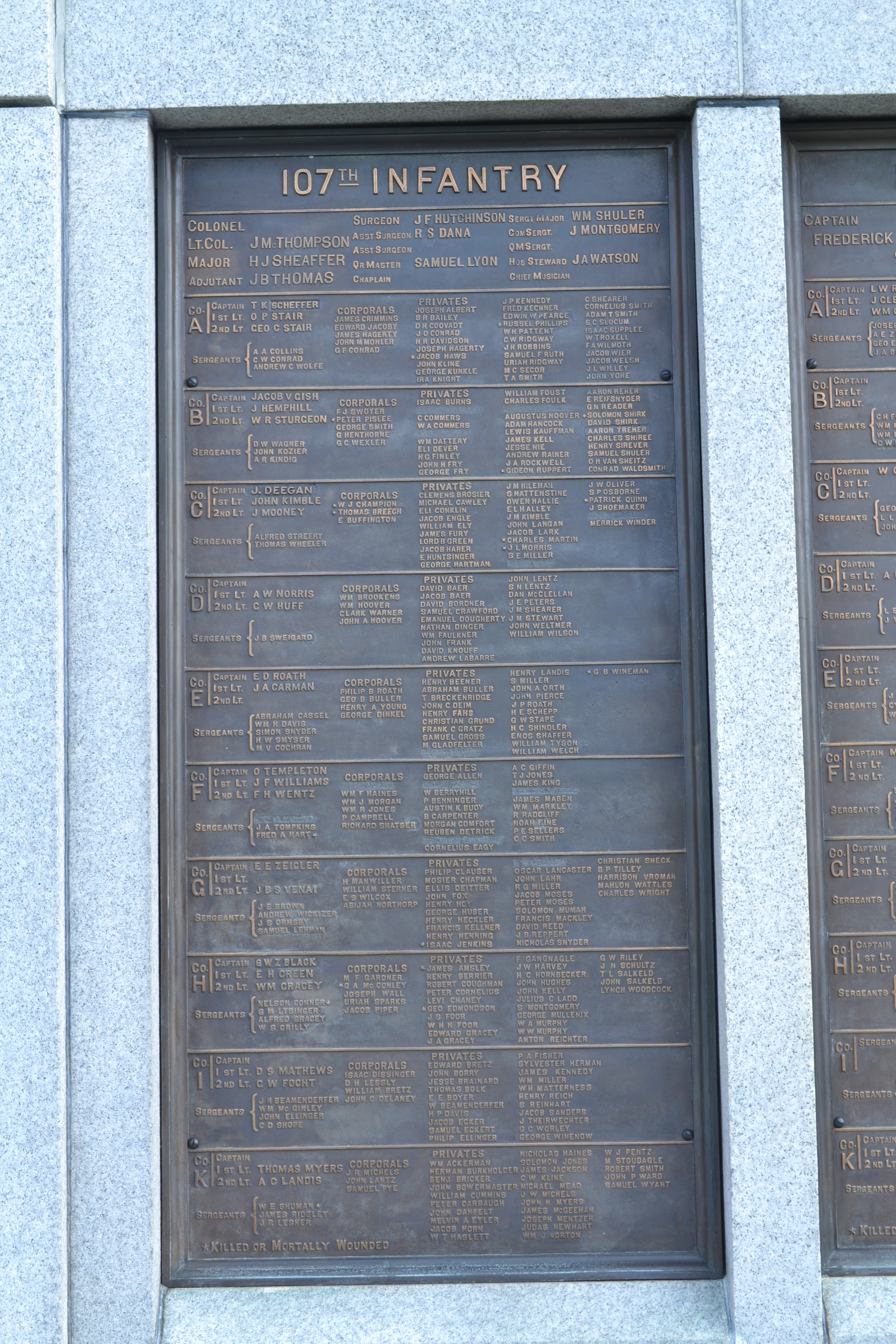
107th Infantry Regiment

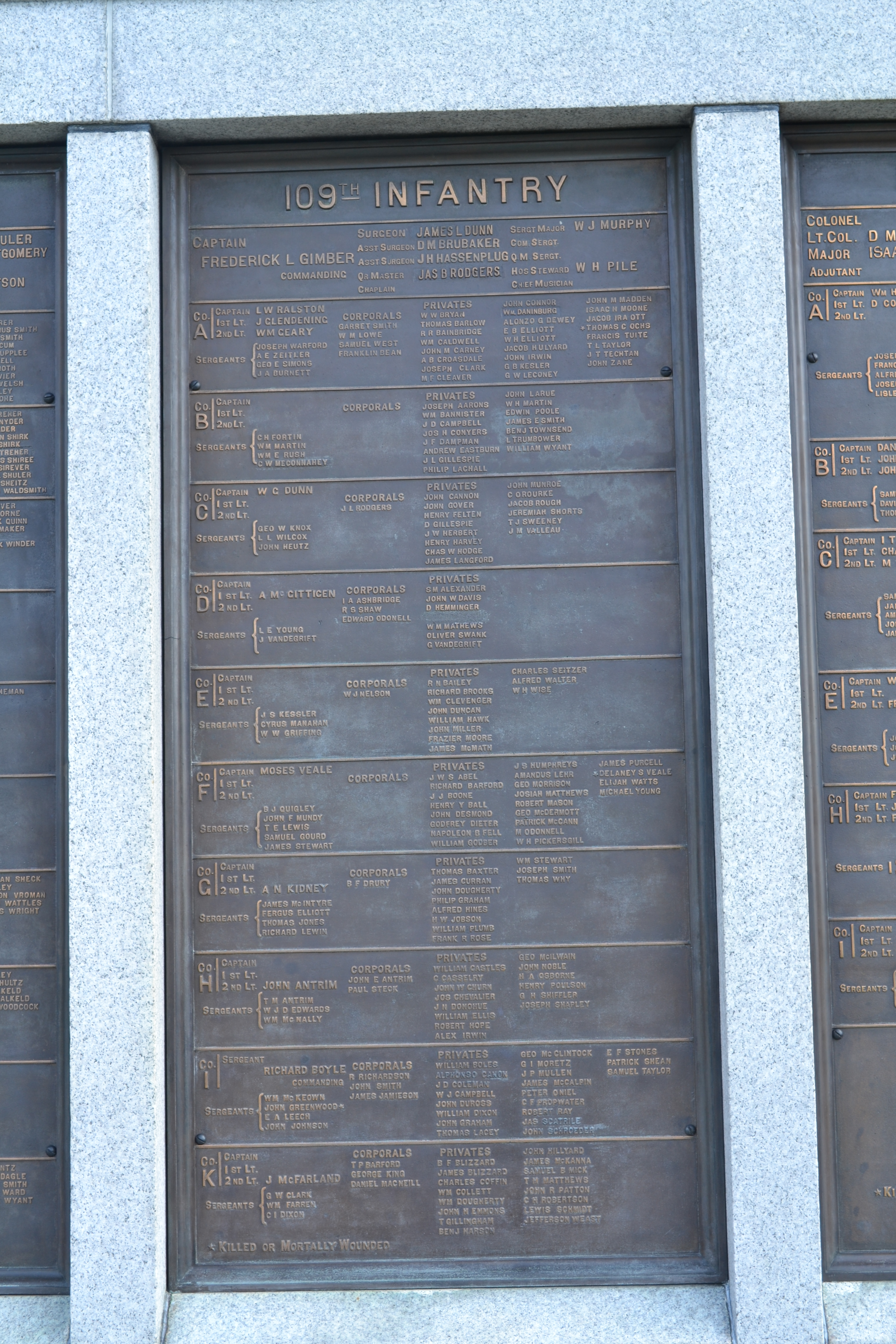
109th Infantry Regiment

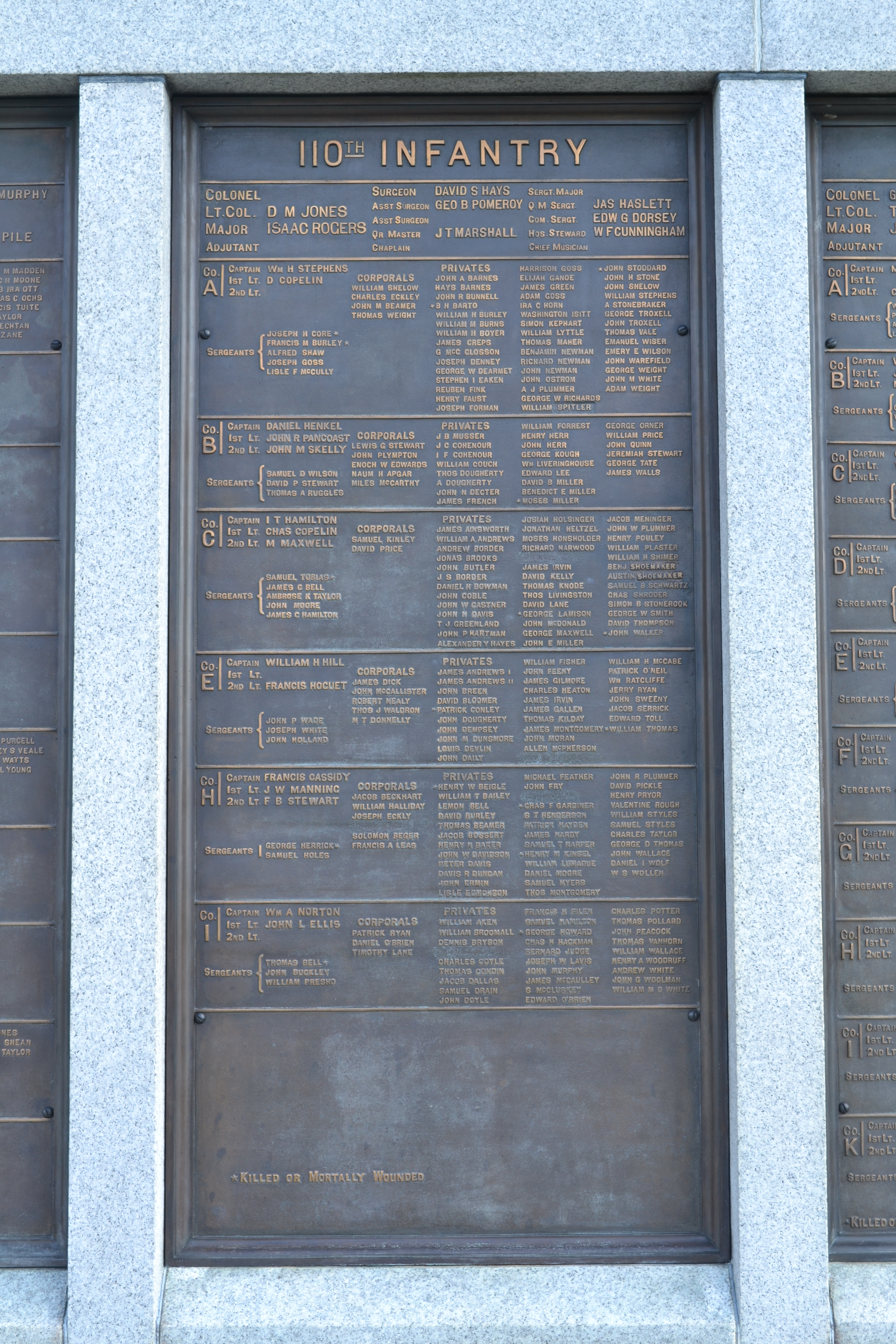
110th Infantry Regiment

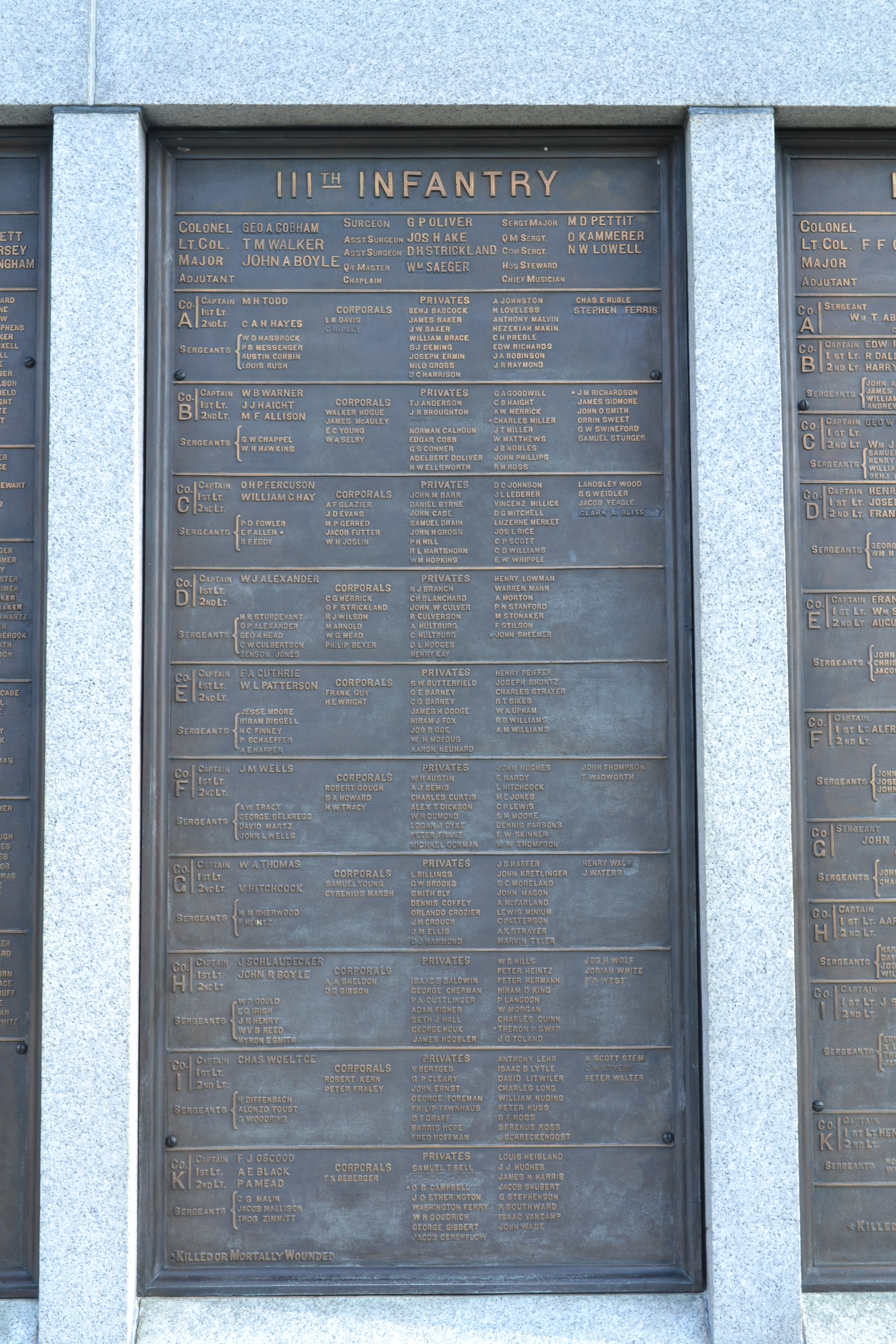
111th Infantry Regiment

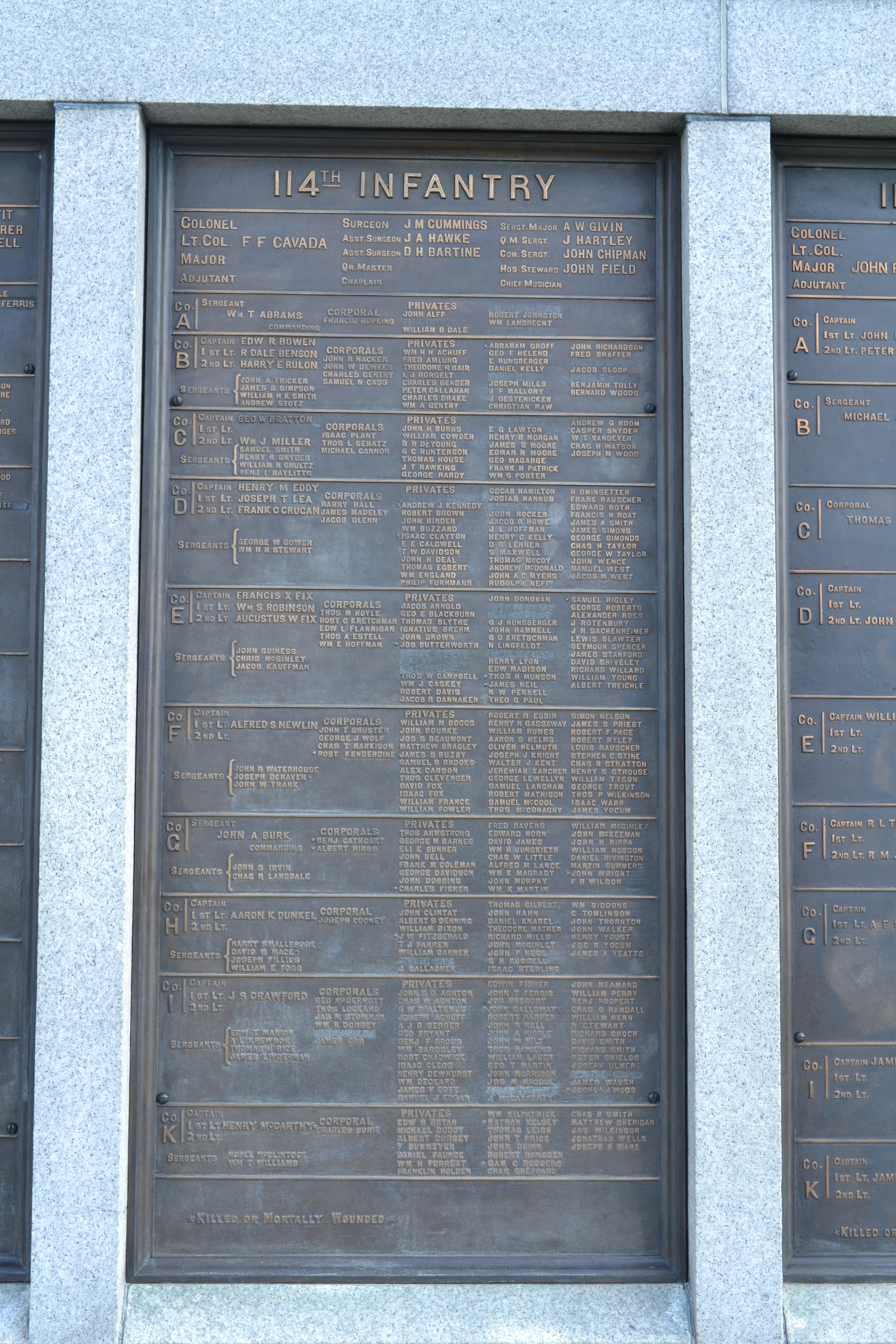
114th Infantry Regiment

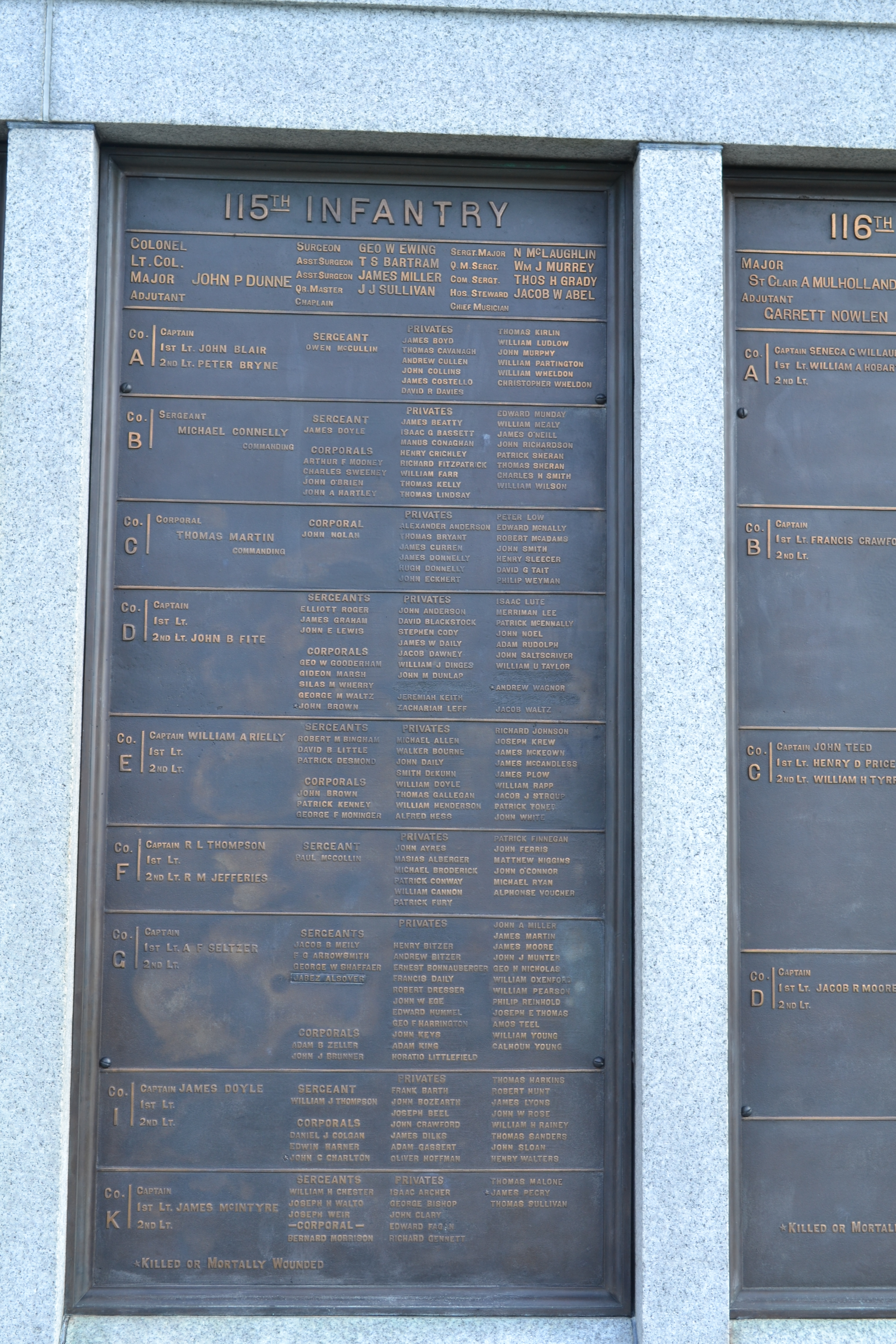
115th Infantry Regiment

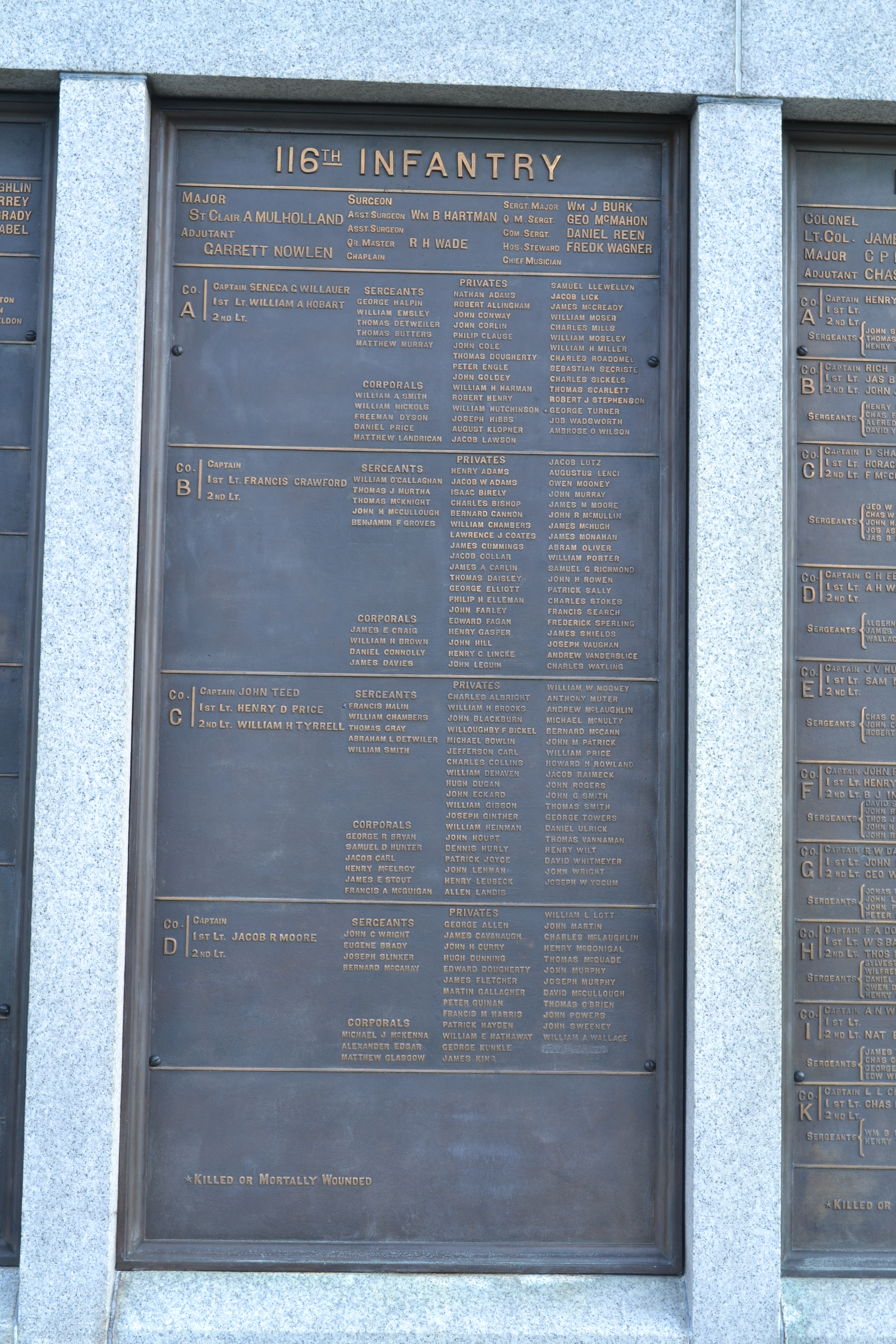
116th Infantry Regiment

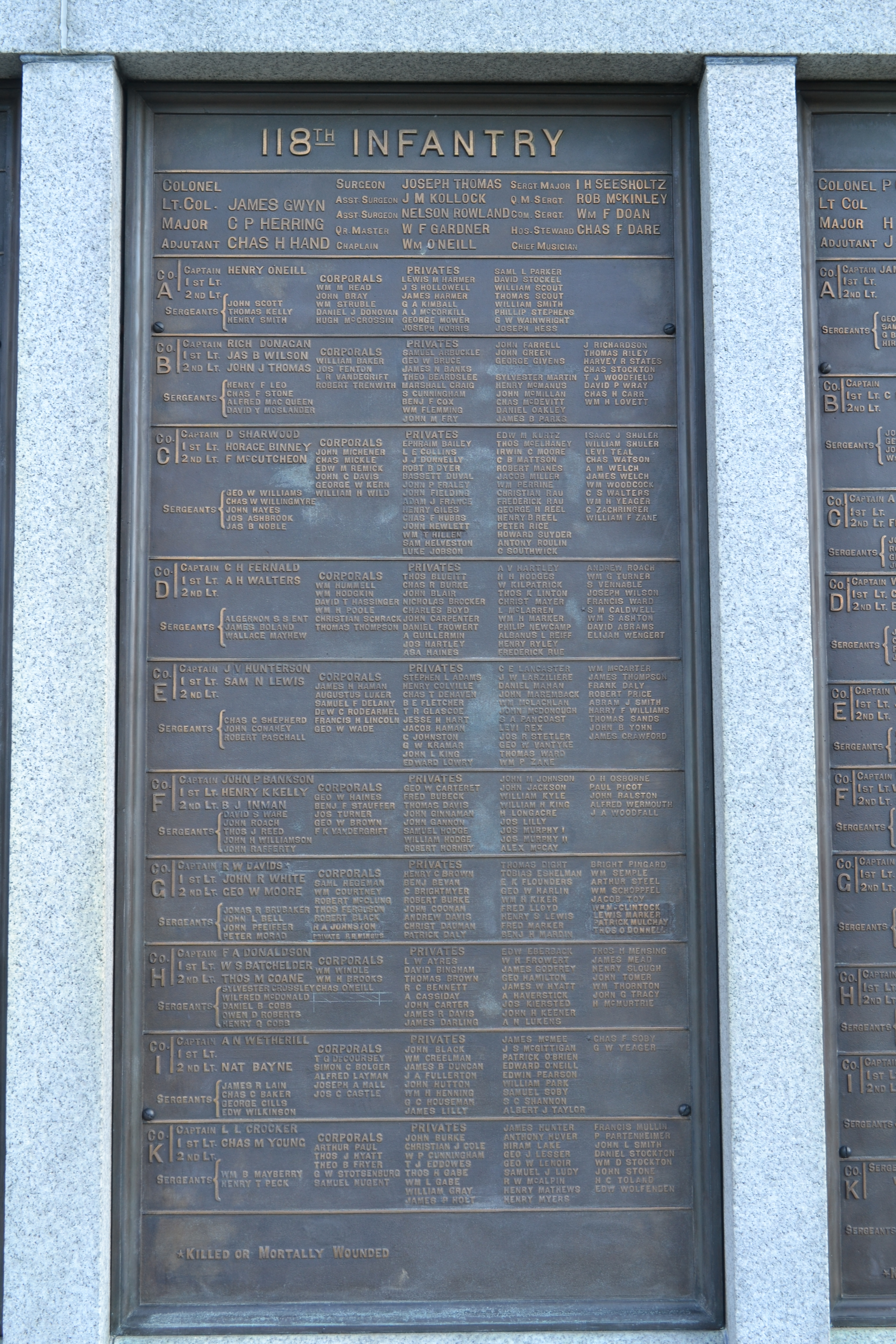
118th Infantry Regiment

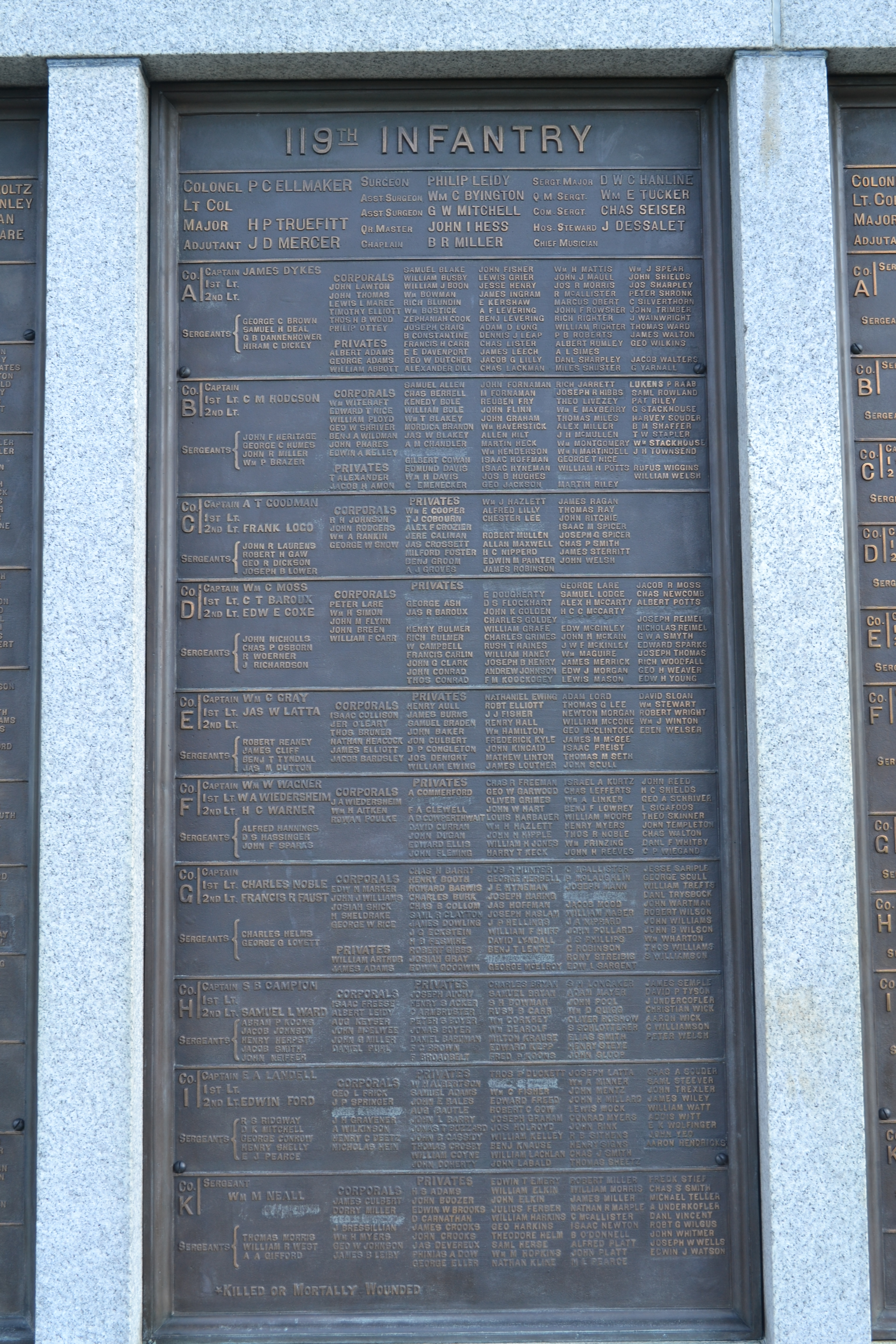
119th Infantry Regiment

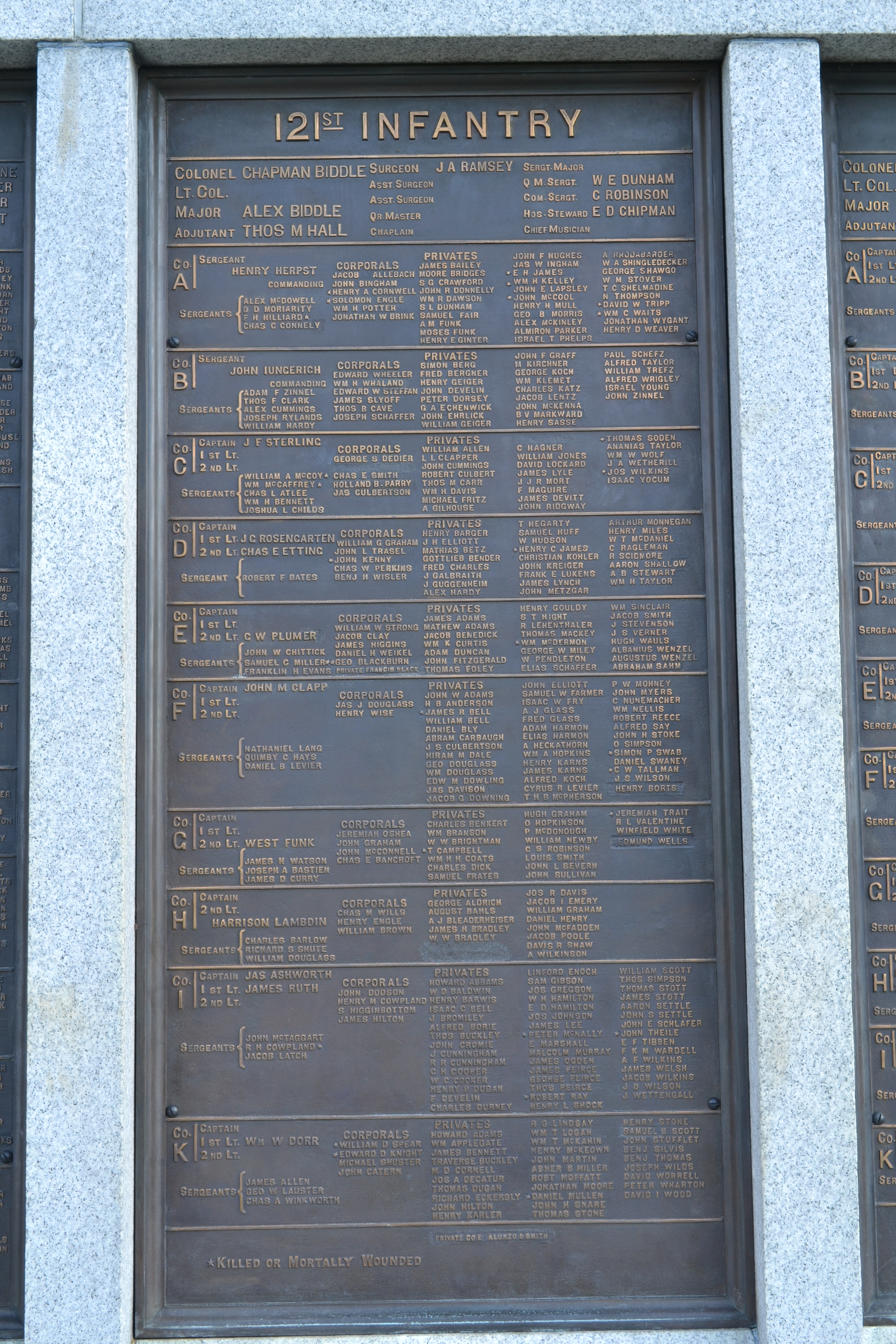
121st Infantry Regiment

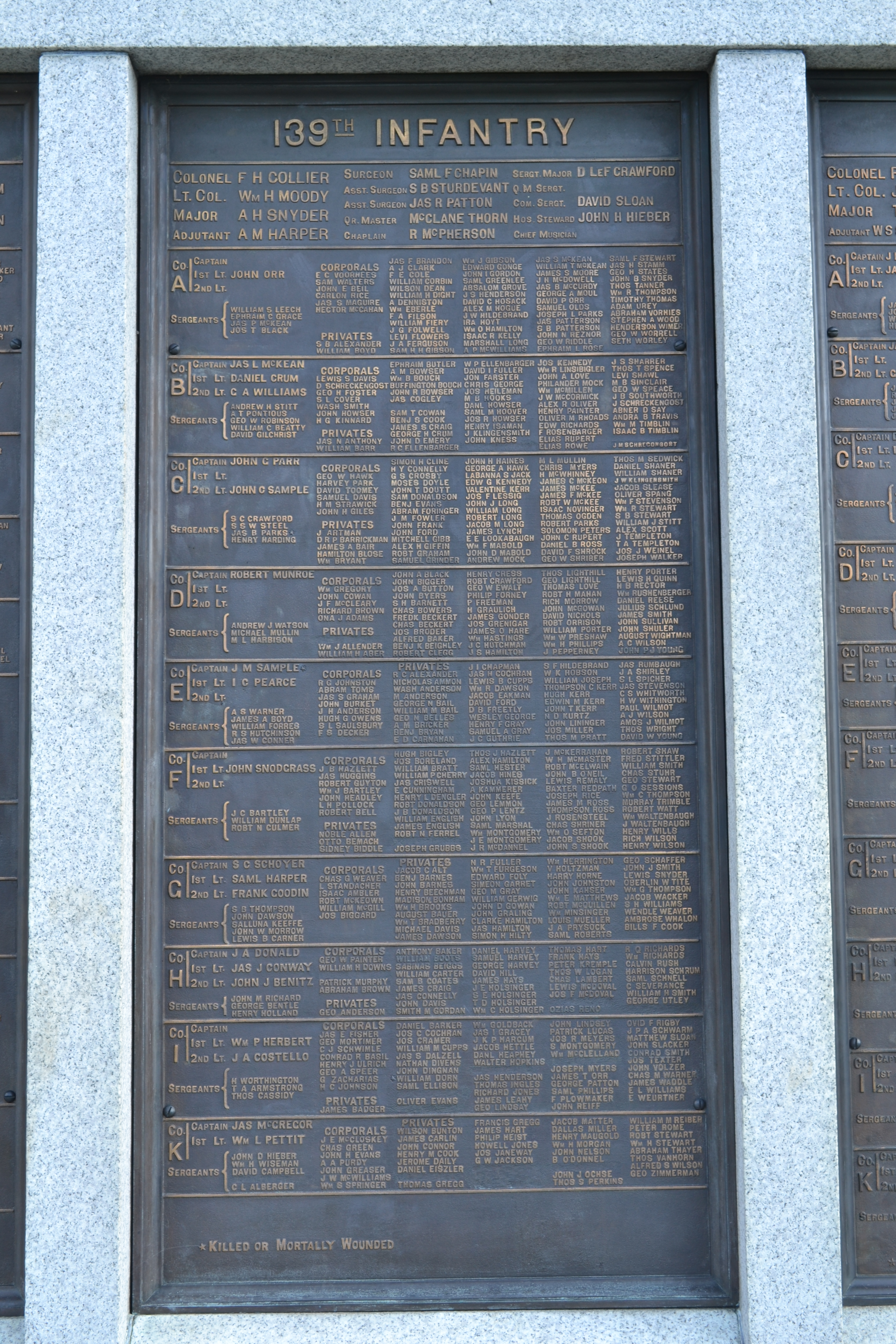
139th Infantry Regiment

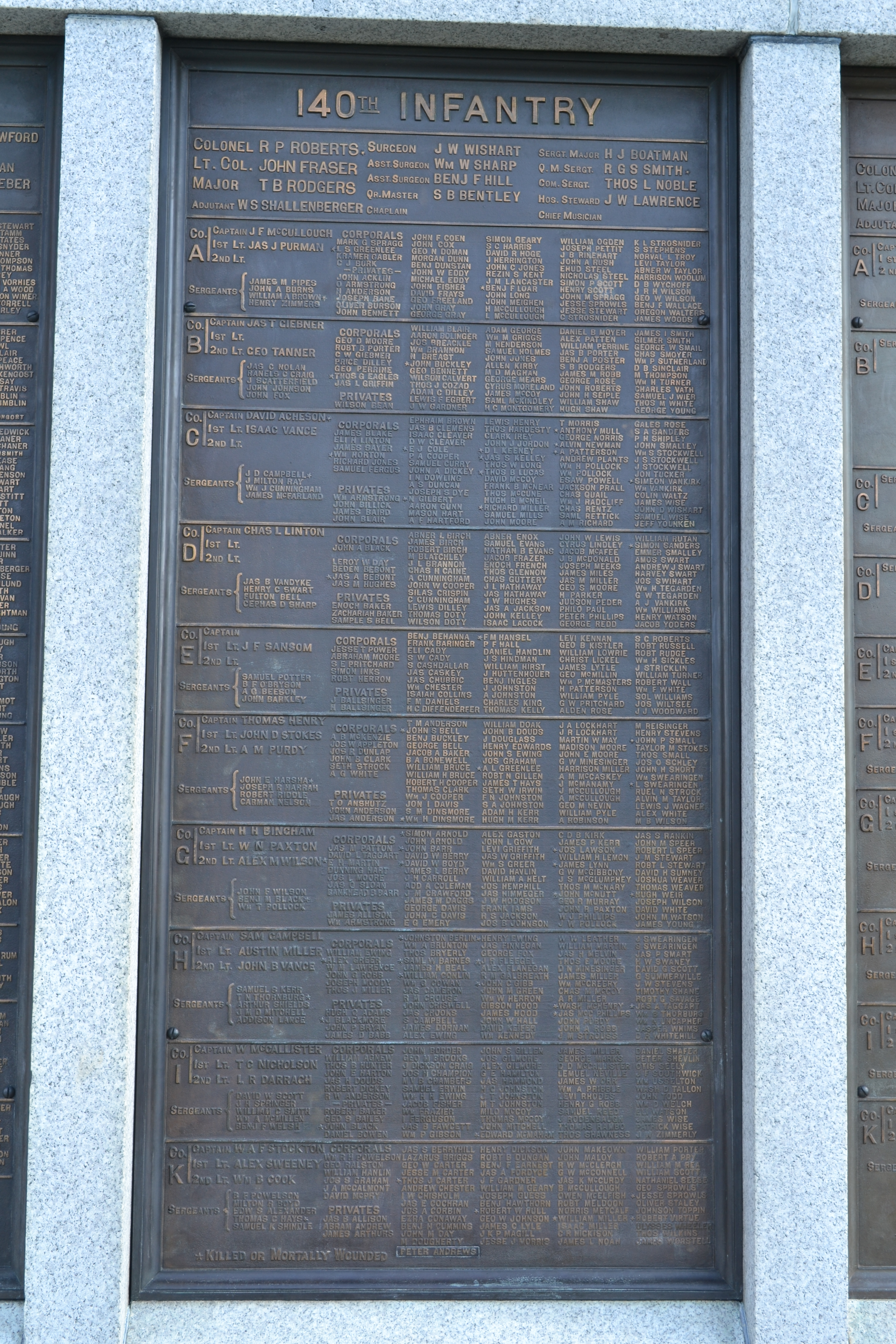
140th Infantry Regiment

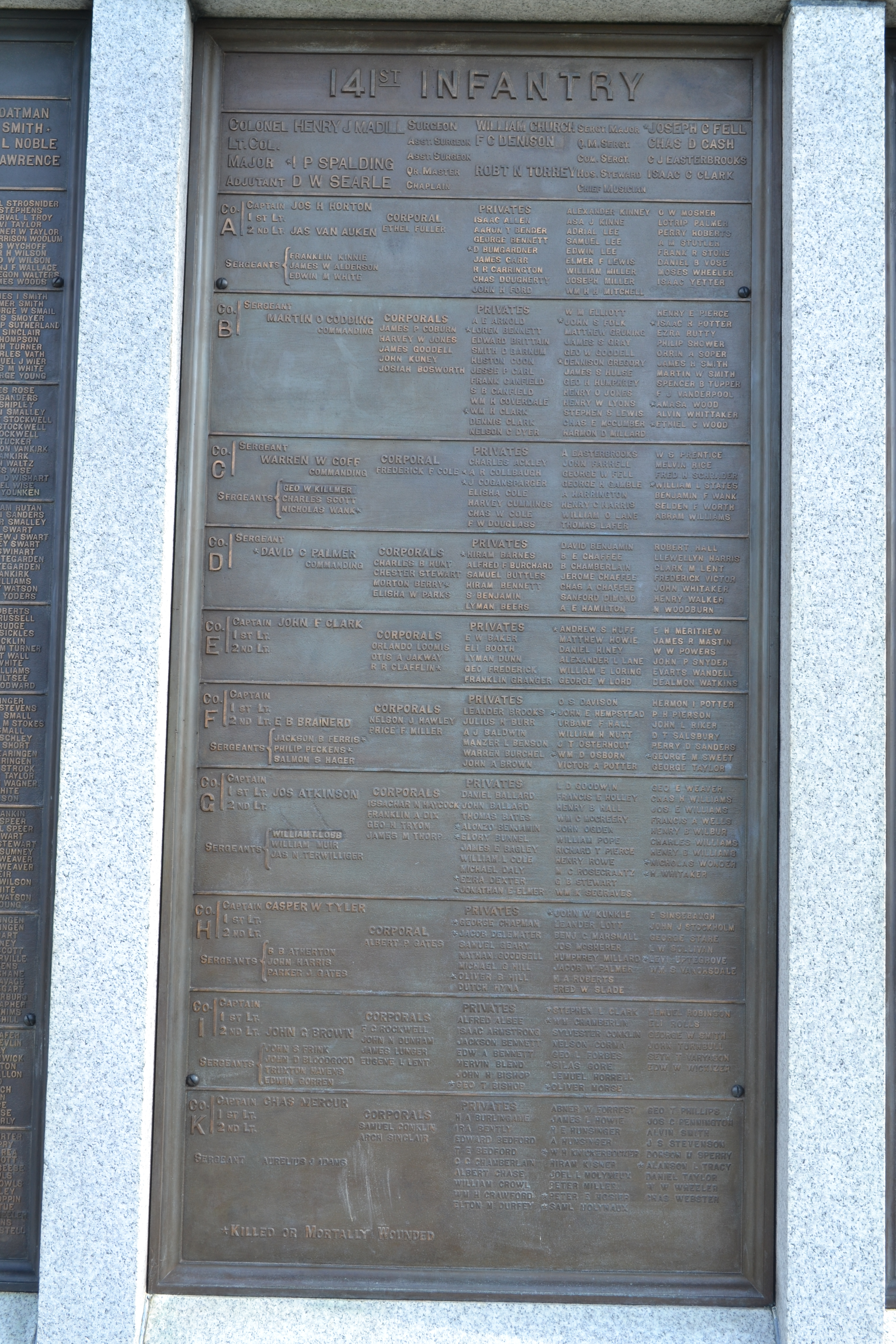
141st Infantry Regiment

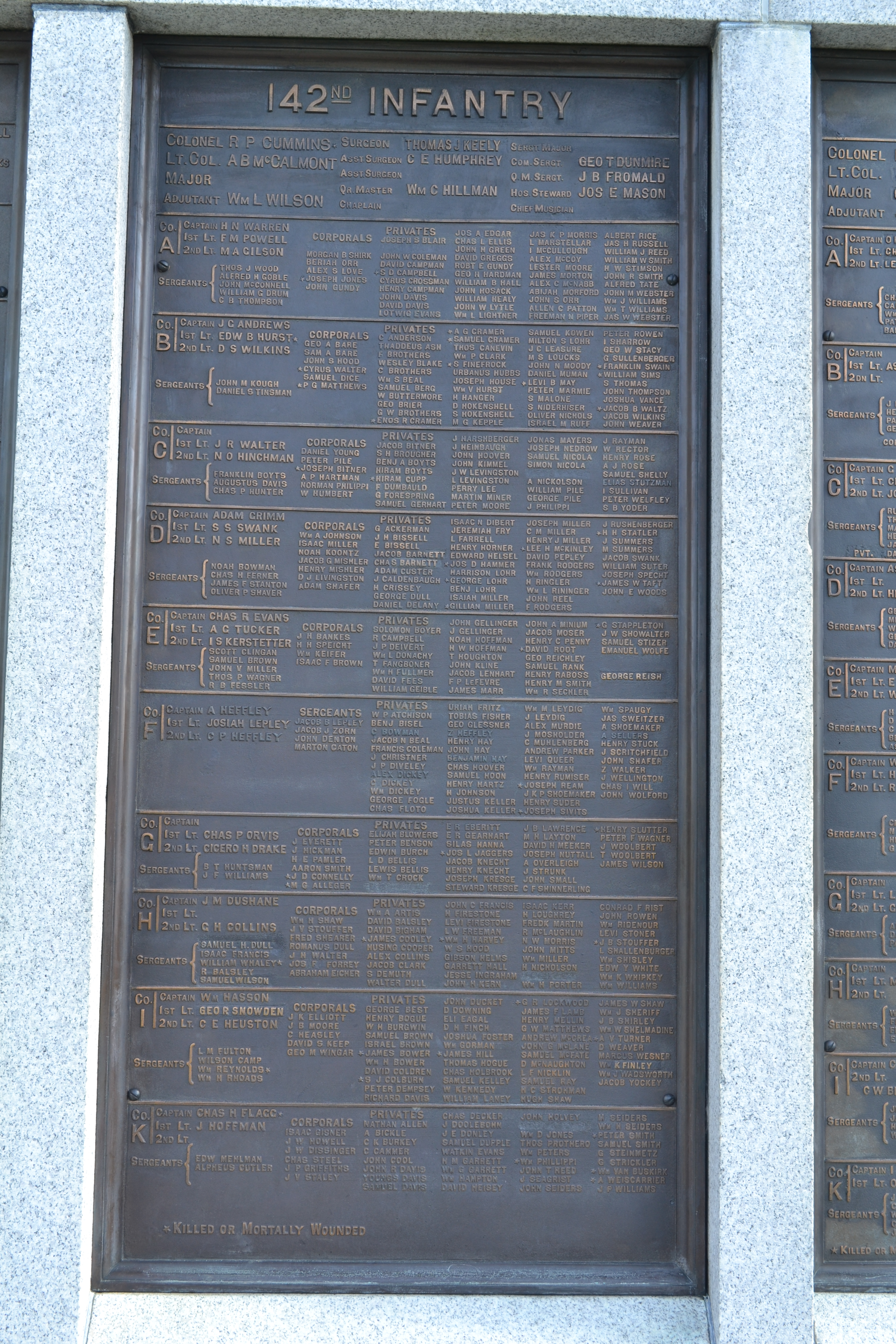
142nd Infantry Regiment

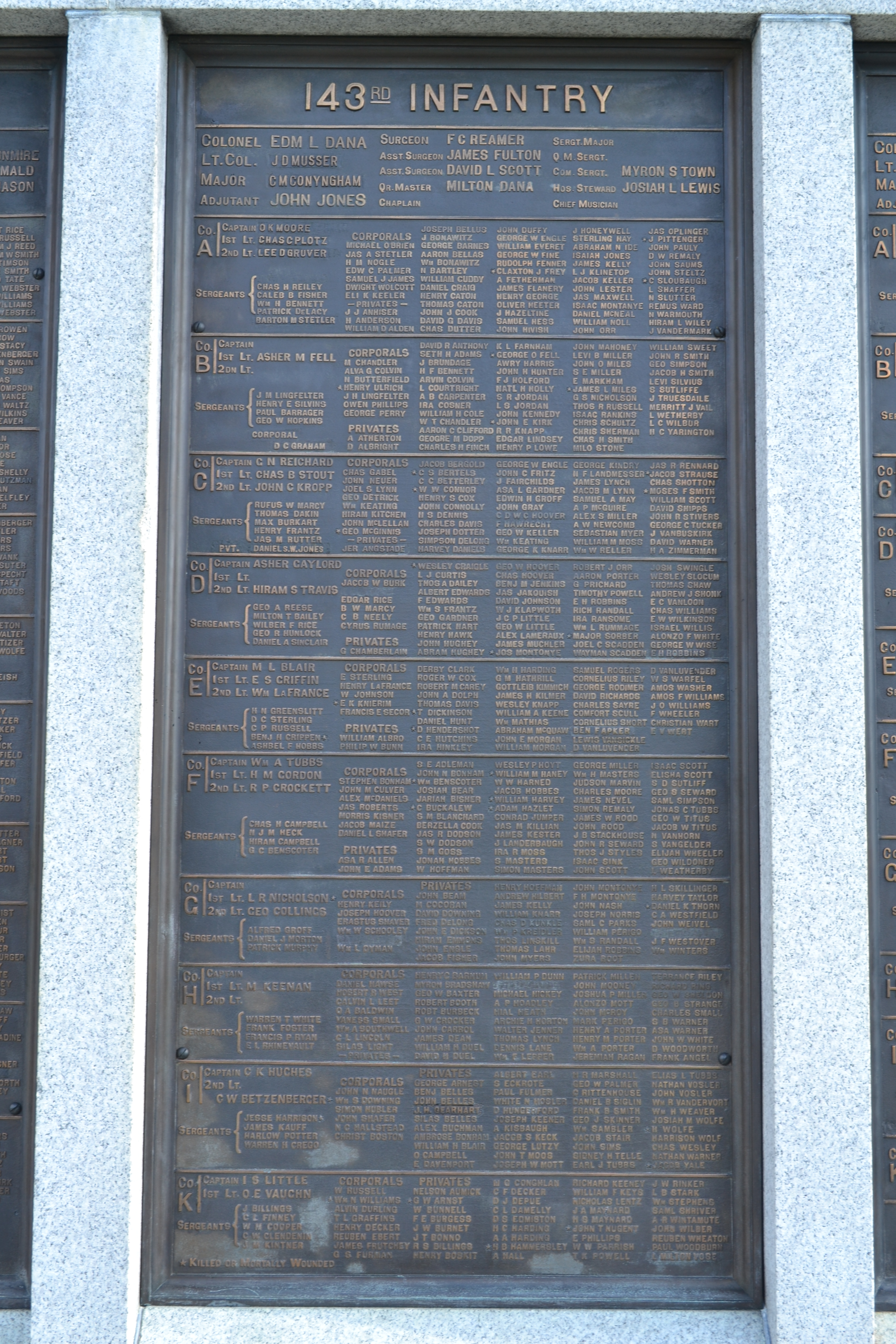
143rd Infantry Regiment

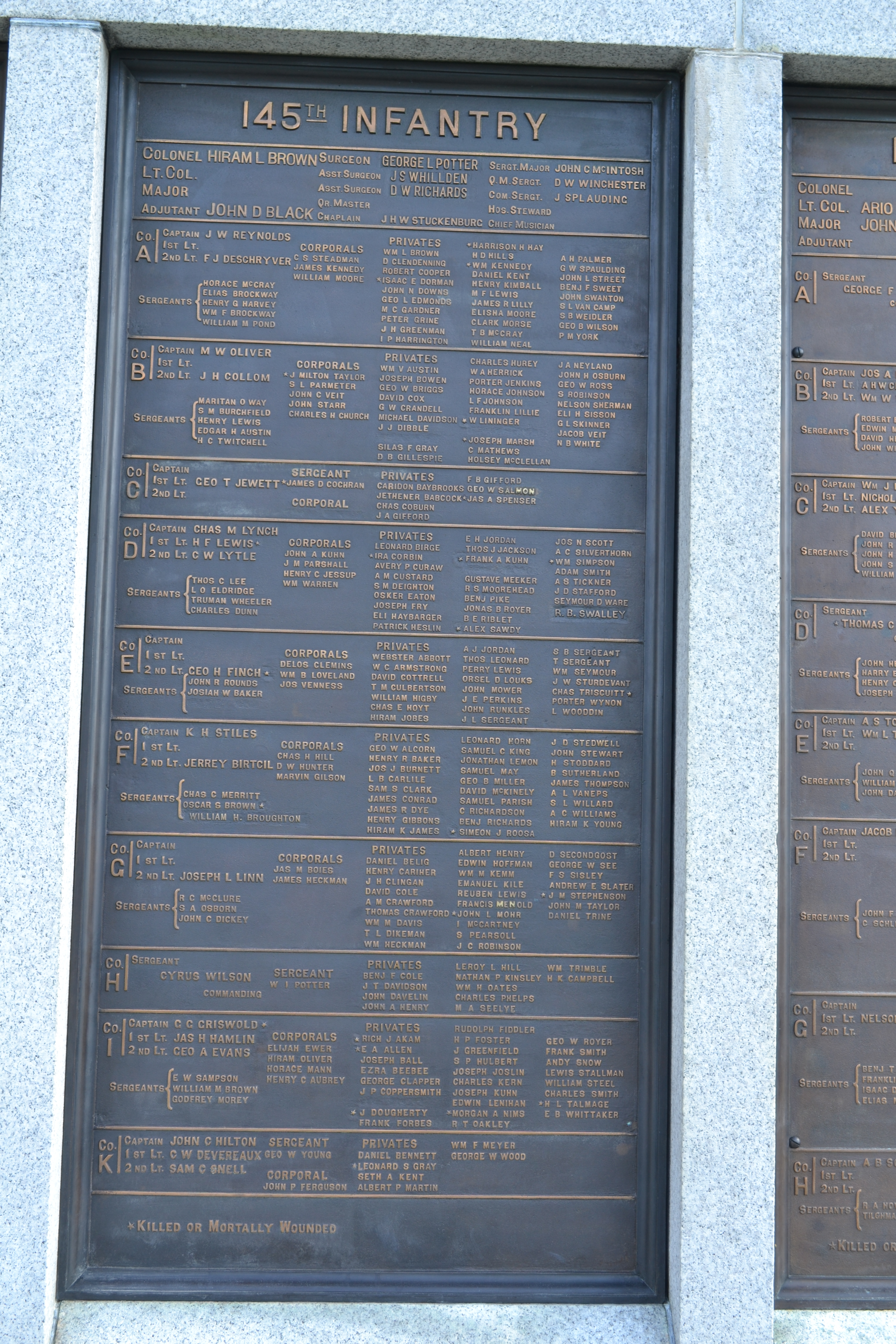
145th Infantry Regiment

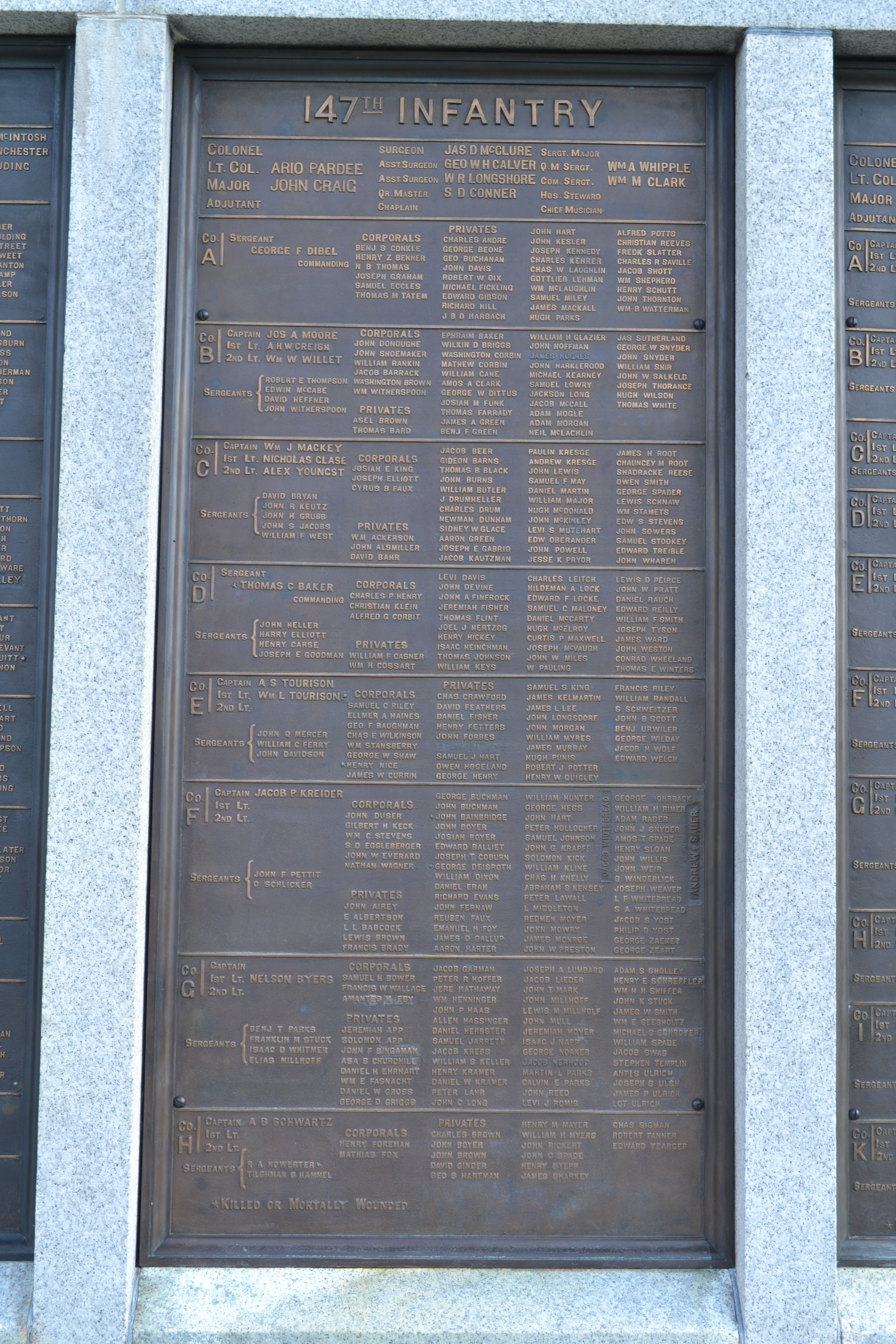
147th Infantry Regiment

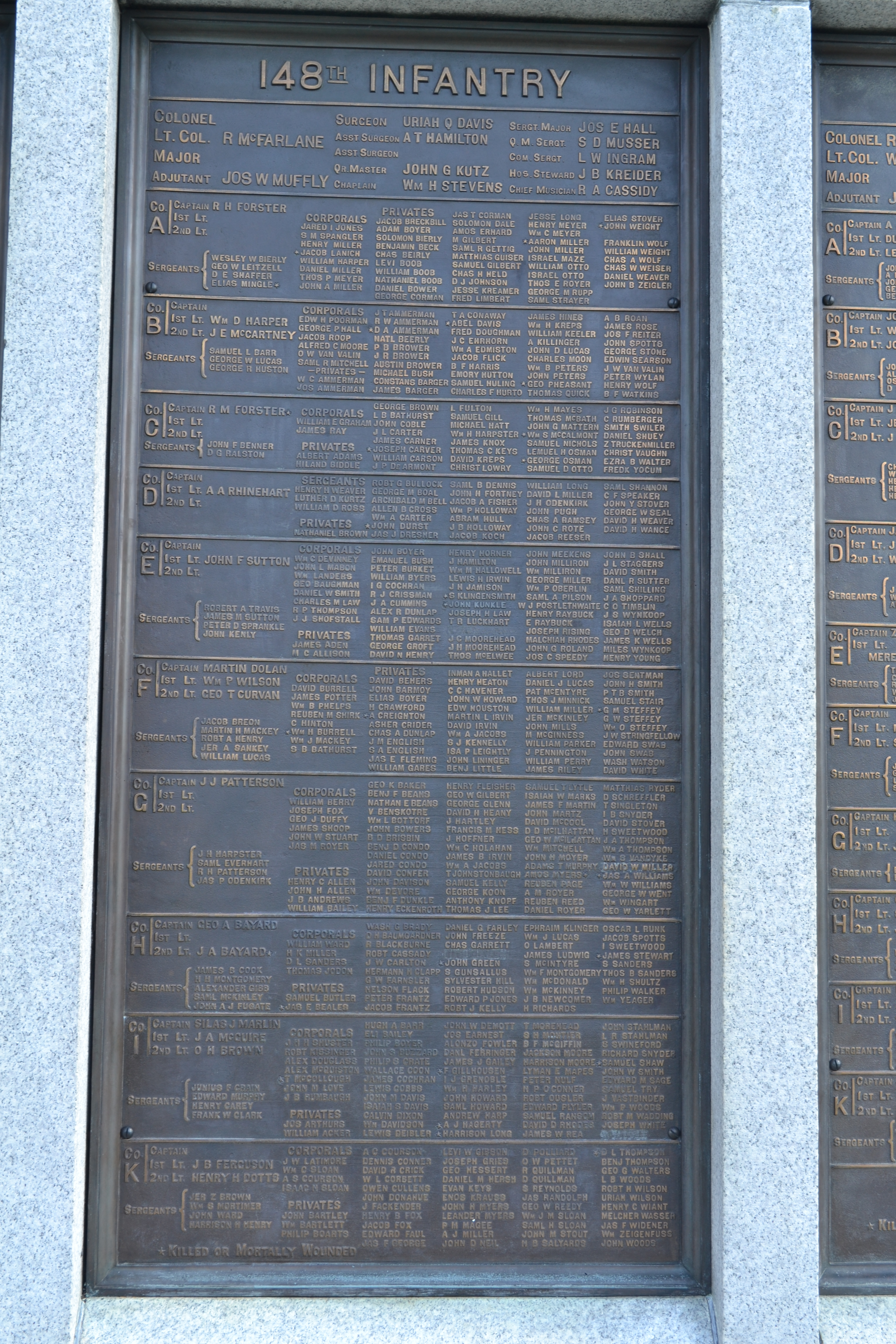
148th Infantry Regiment

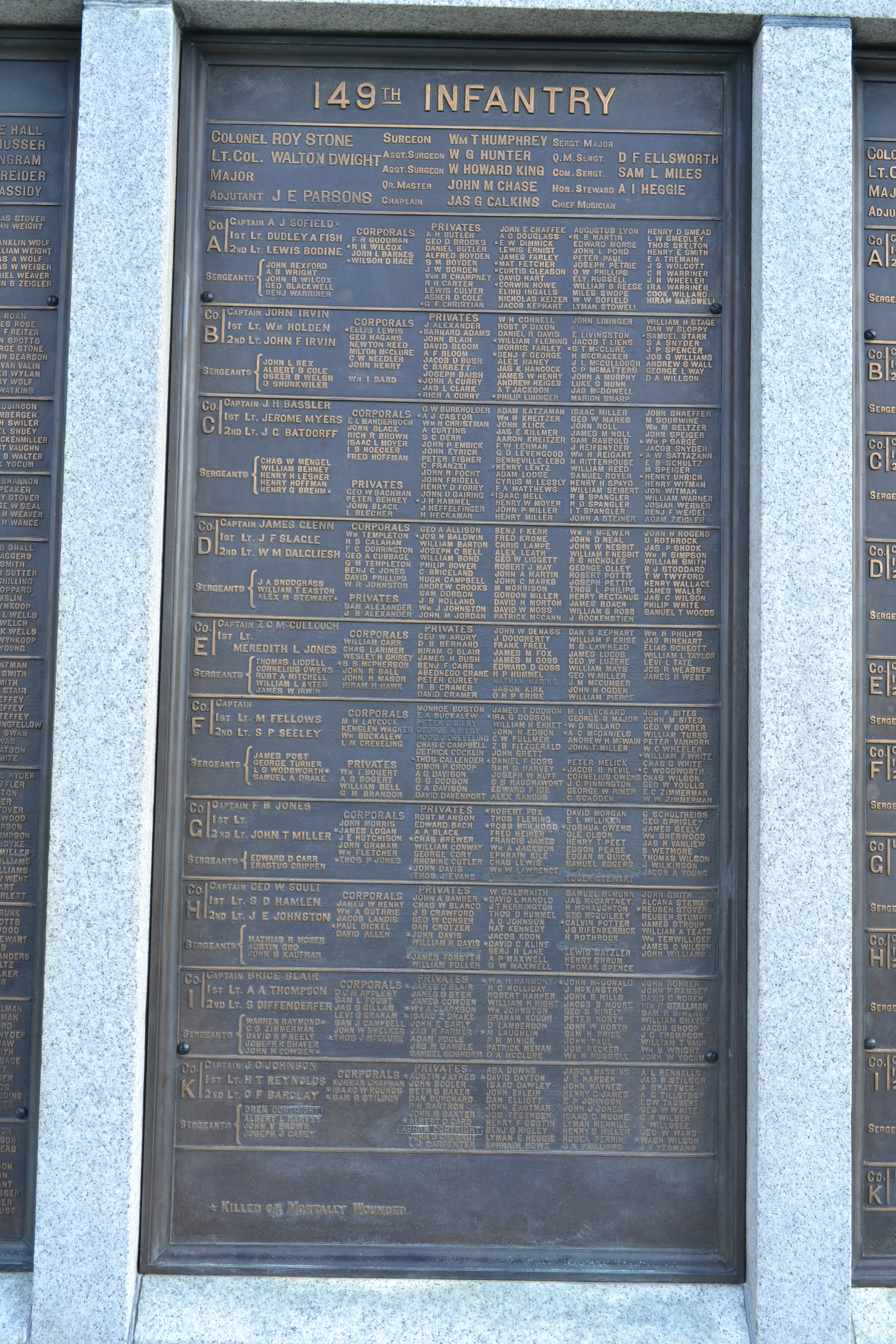
149th Infantry Regiment

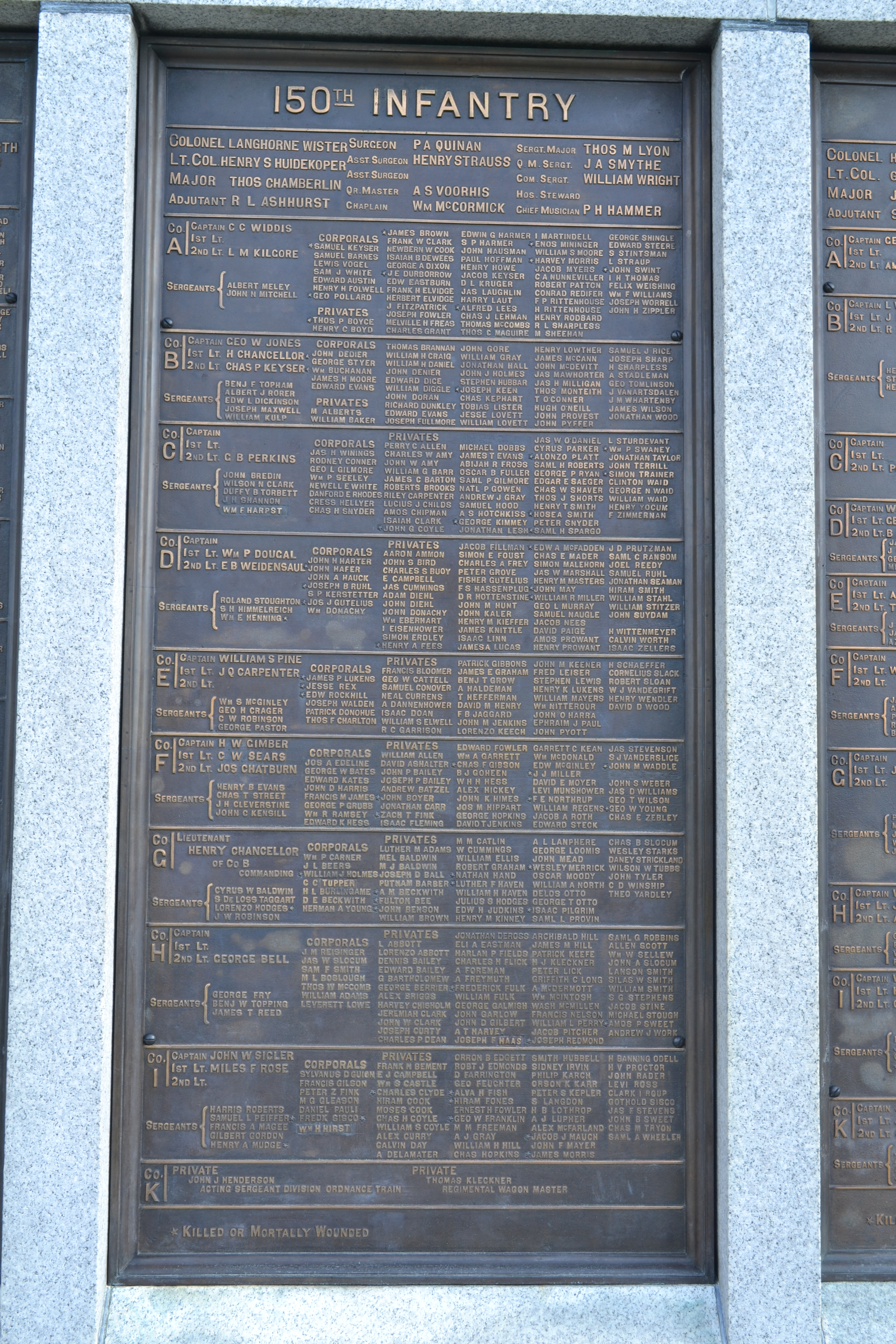
150th Infantry Regiment

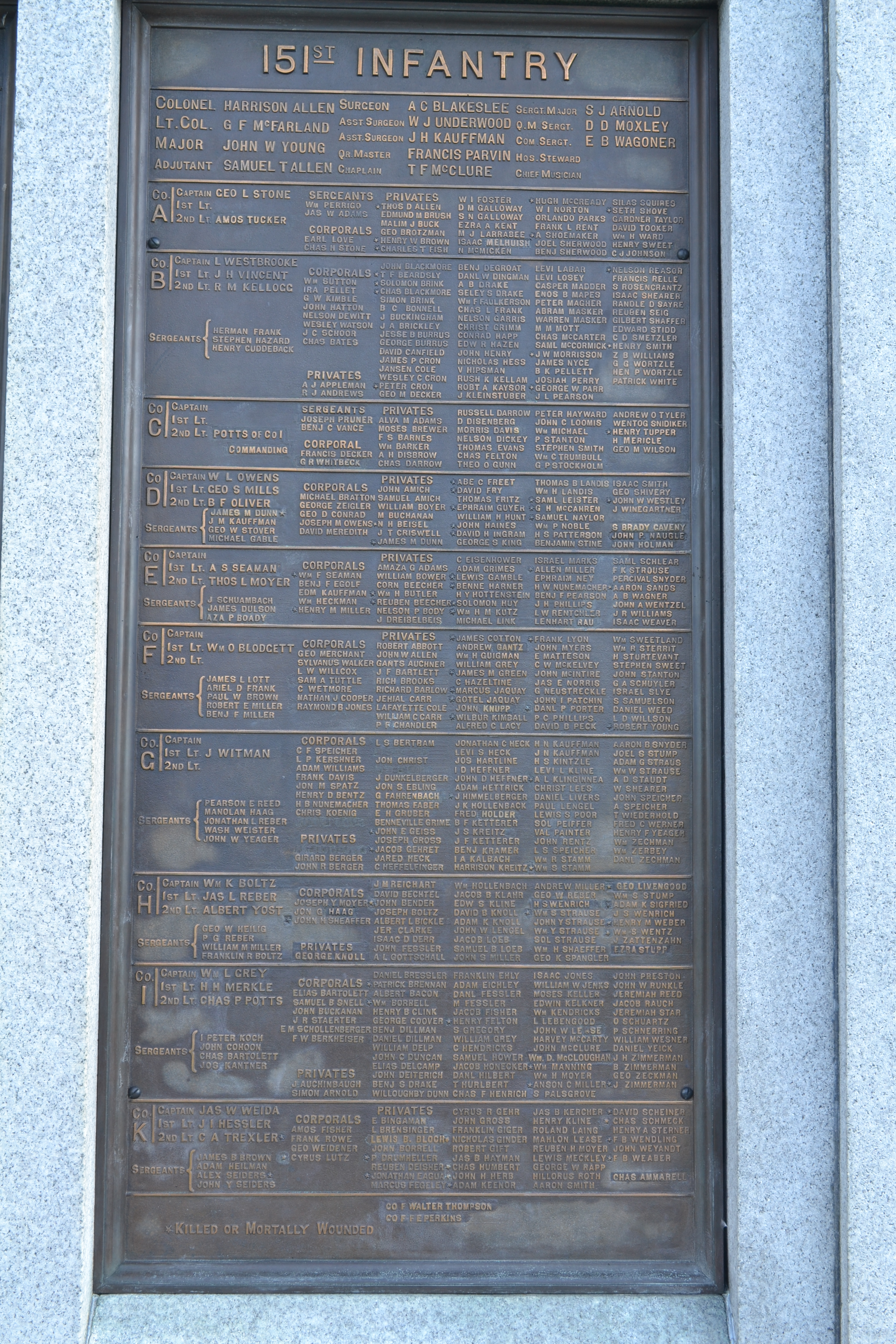
151st Infantry Regiment

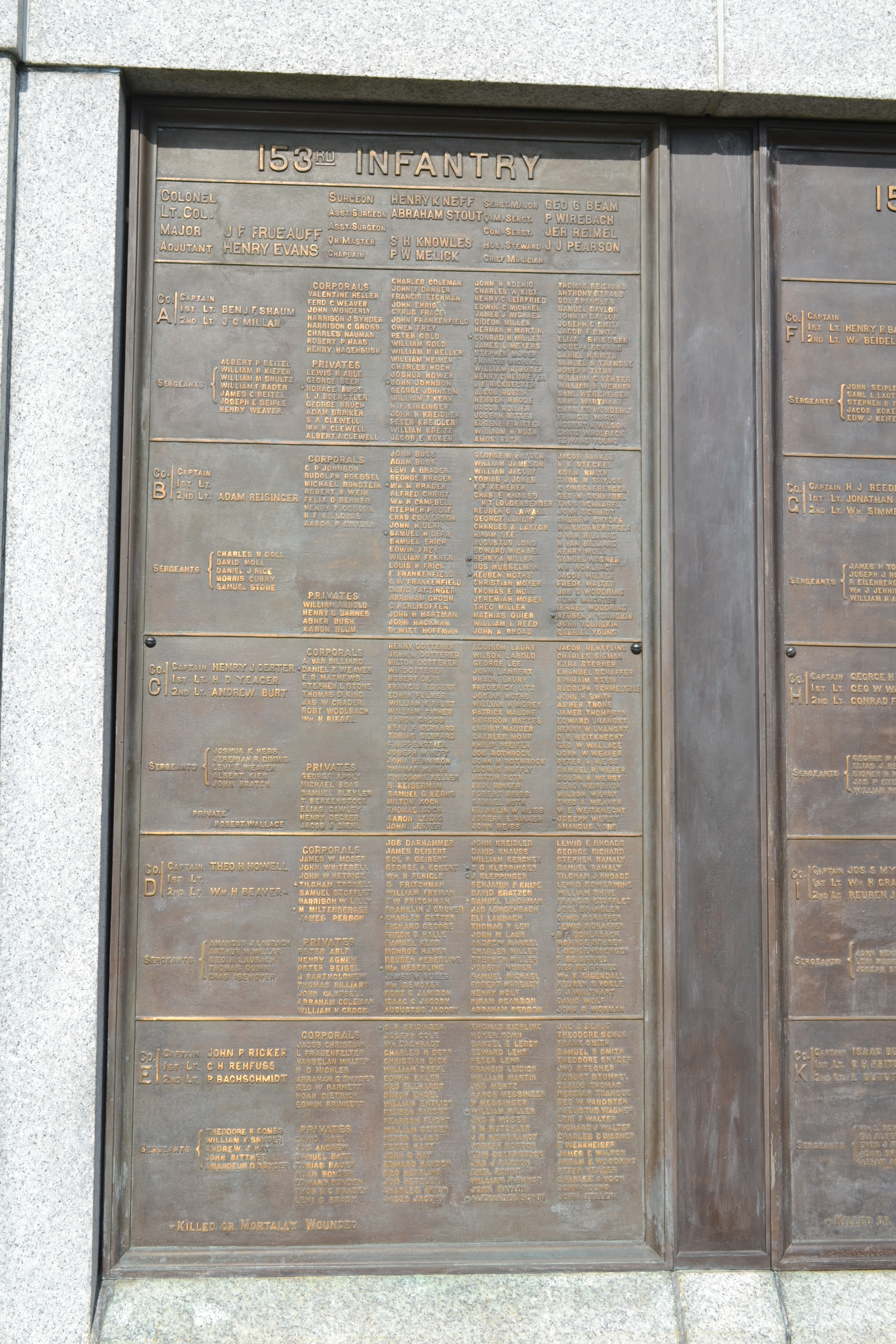
153rd Infantry Regiment

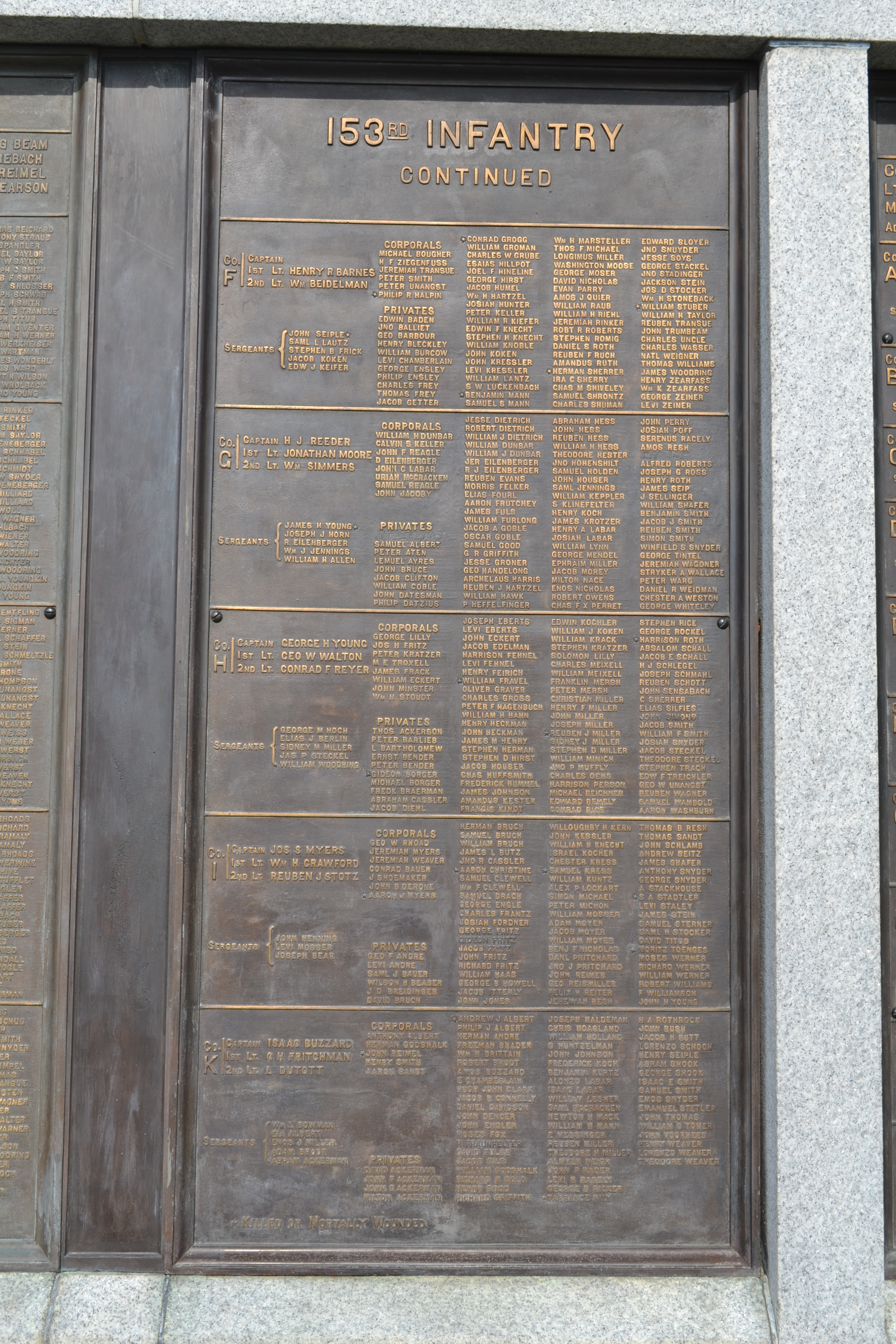
153rd Infantry Regiment

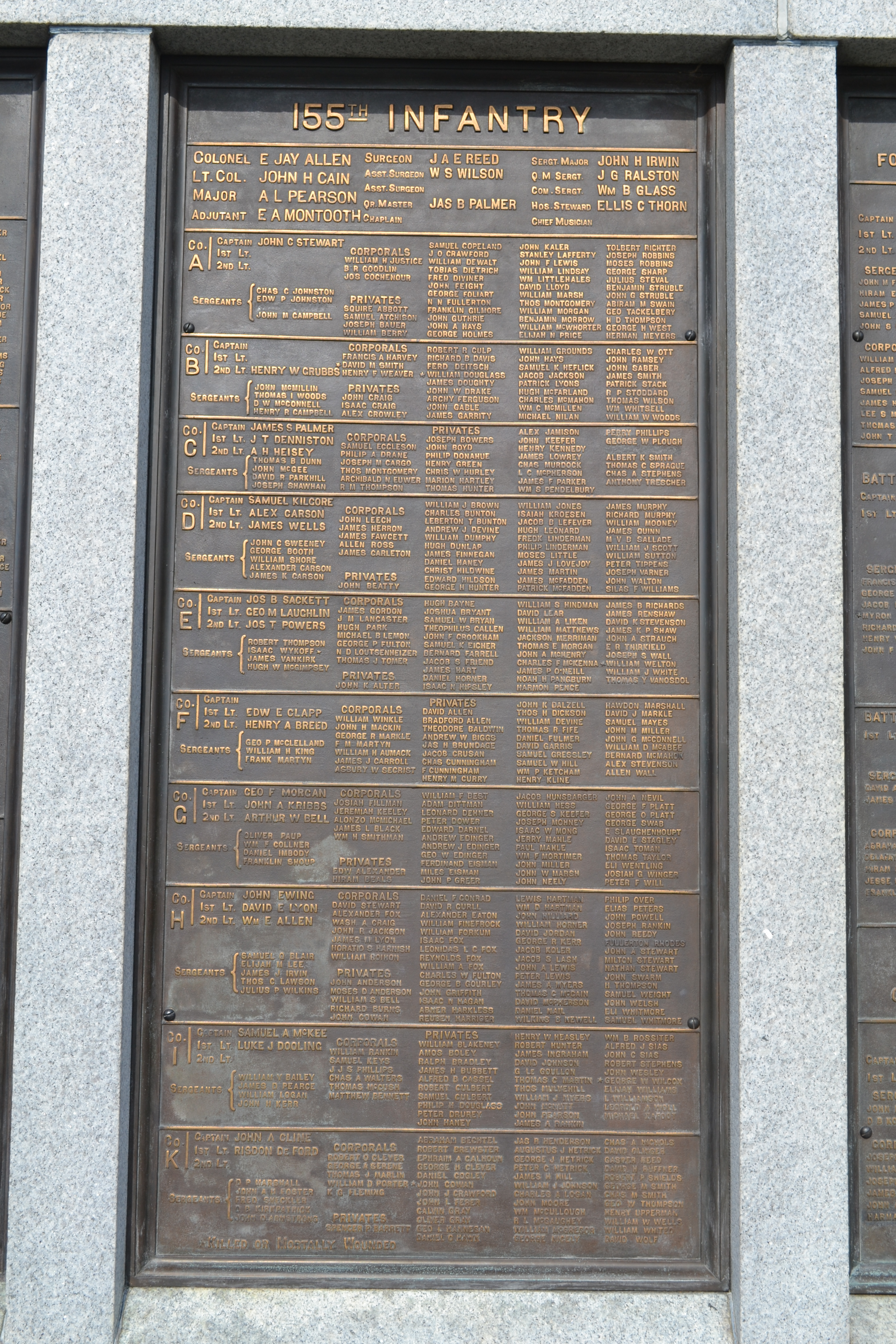
155th Infantry Regiment

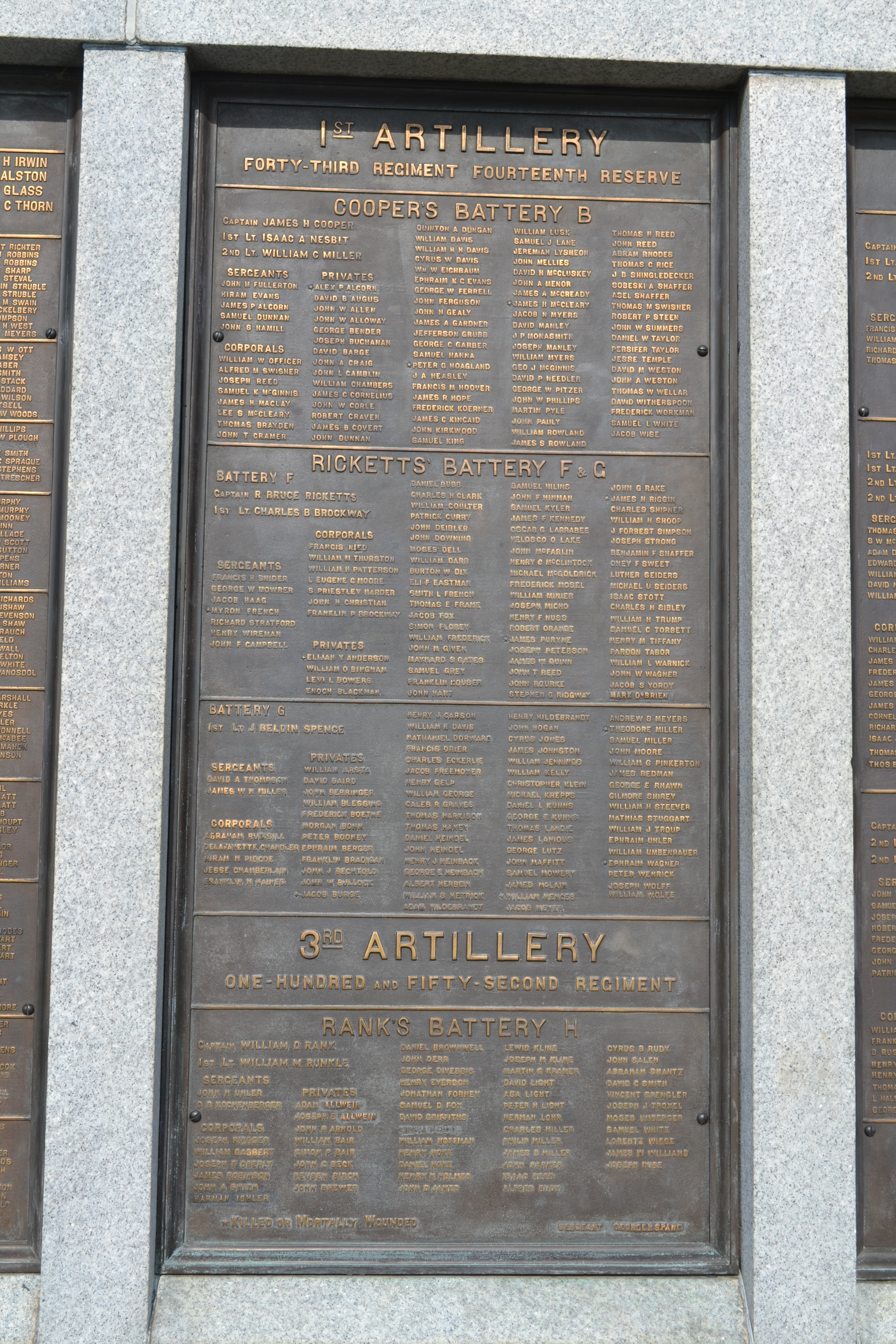
1st and 3rd Pennsylvania Artillery

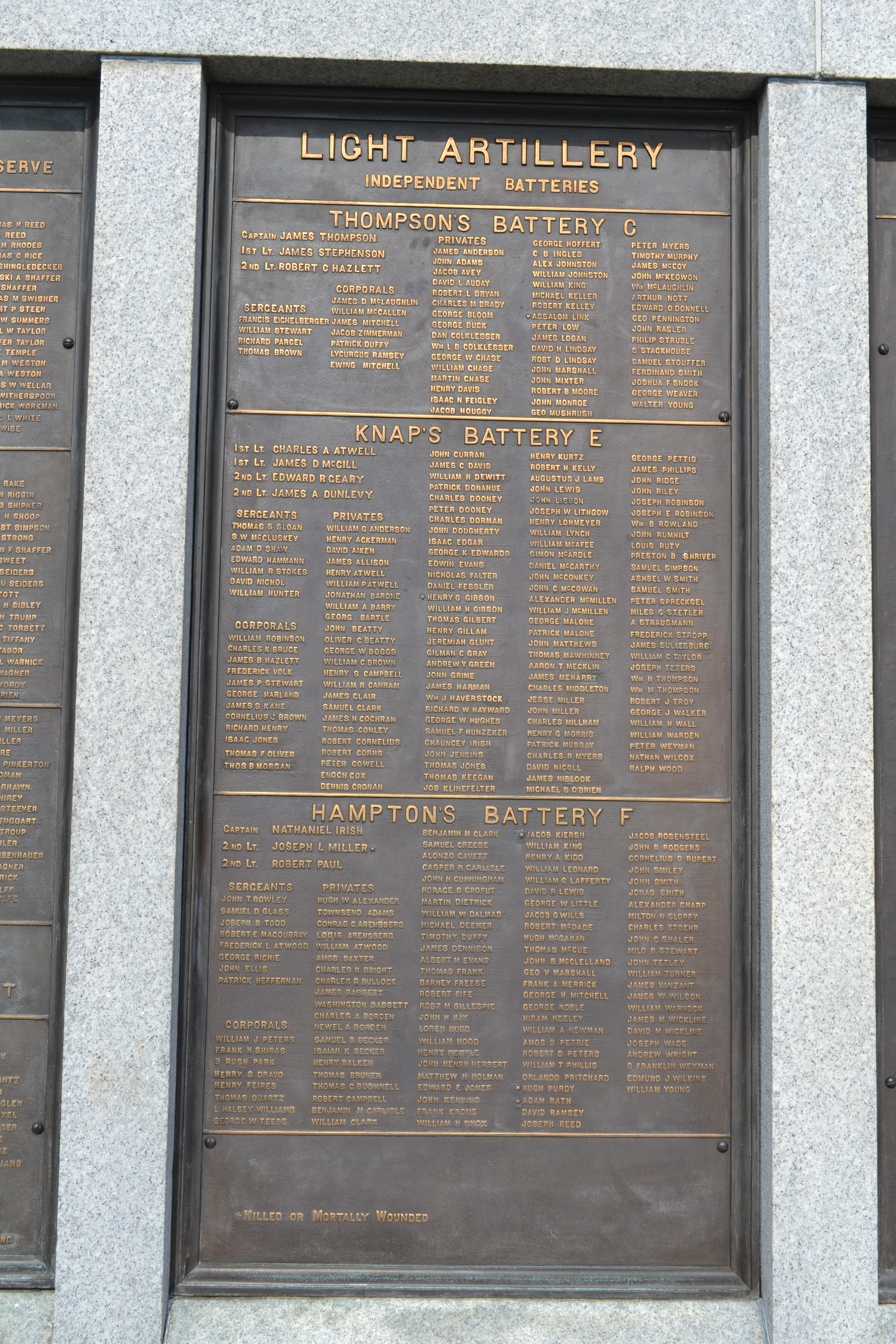
Pennsylvania Light Artillery Batteries

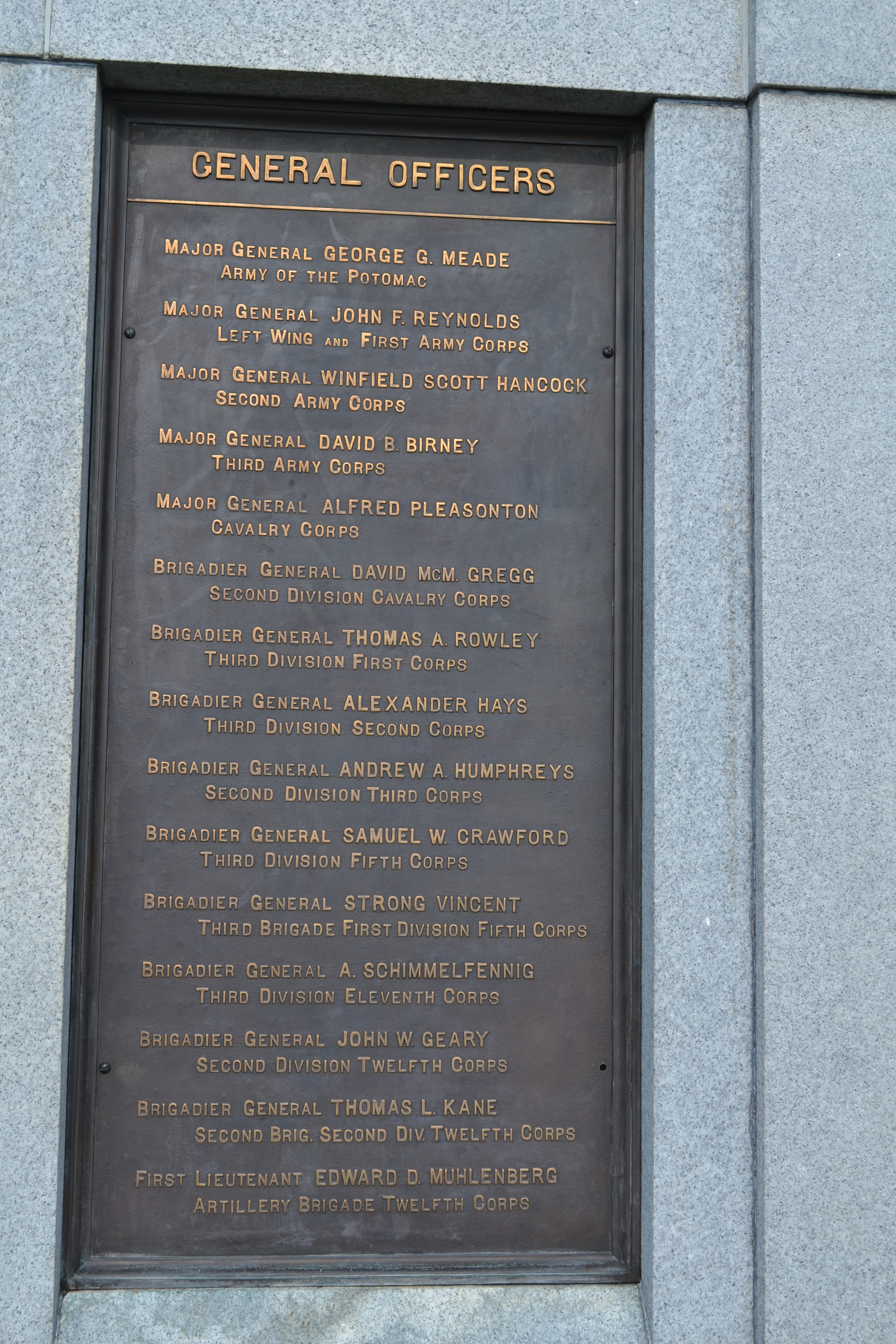
Pennsylvania General Officers

== Maintenance ==
In 1921, the dome was lined with steel and sealed by William D. Gilbert and James Weikert and in 1929, the monument's copper was relined and defective woodwork was replaced. The nearby comfort station was completed in 1933 as the first "Gettysburg Parkitecture" structure using Gettysburg granite as in native colonial structures. A 1941 memorial bench of marble in front of the monument was broken by "unknown culprits" in 1952, and a marble bench was smashed in 1994.

== Images ==
External images
- Photograph during construction
- Google Maps overhead view

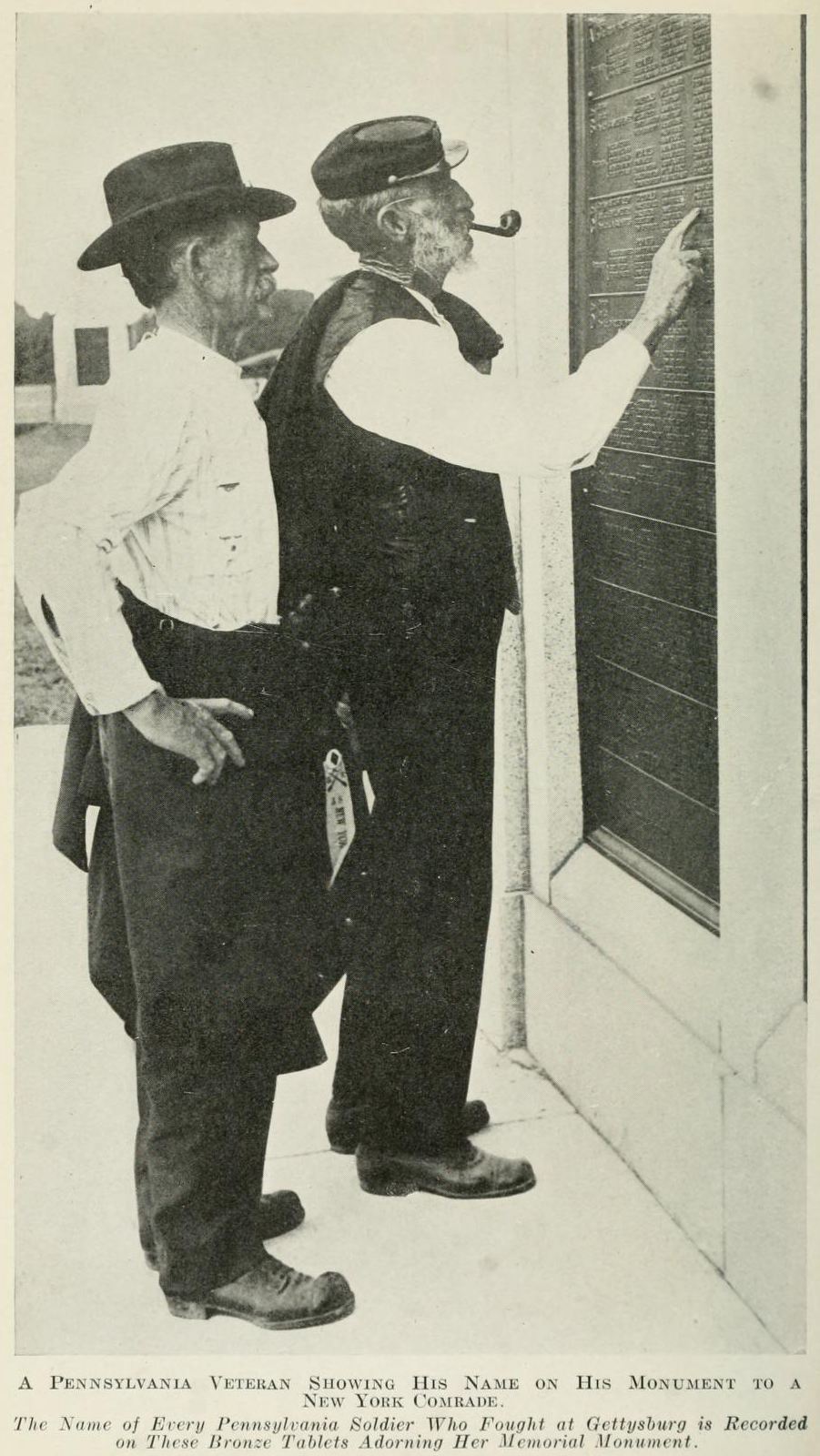
Gettysburg veterans reading the bronze tablets, 50th anniversary of the battle, July 1913.

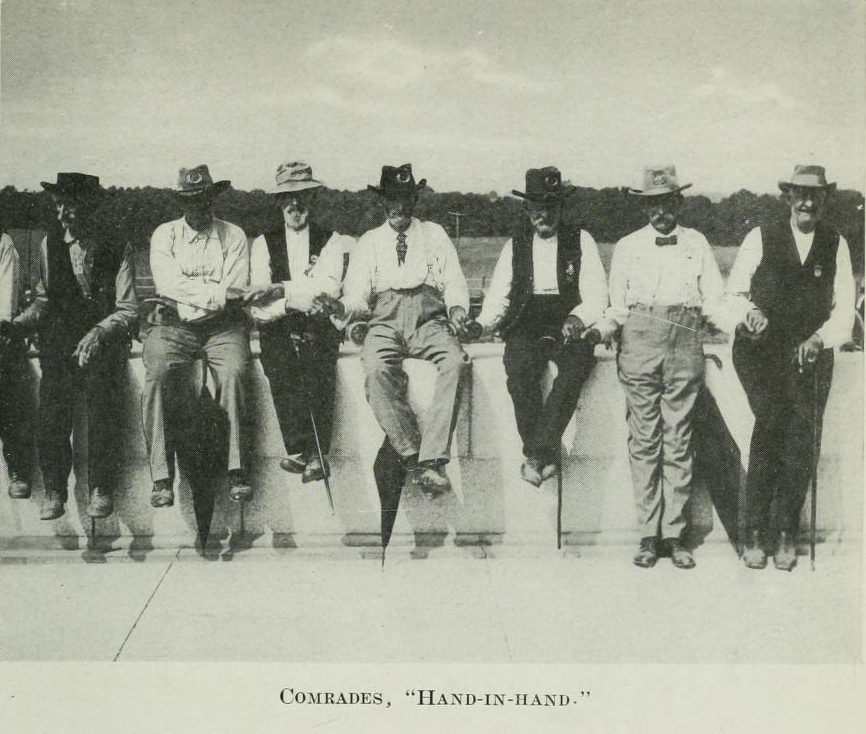
Gettysburg veterans seated on the terrace wall, 50th anniversary of the battle, July 1913.

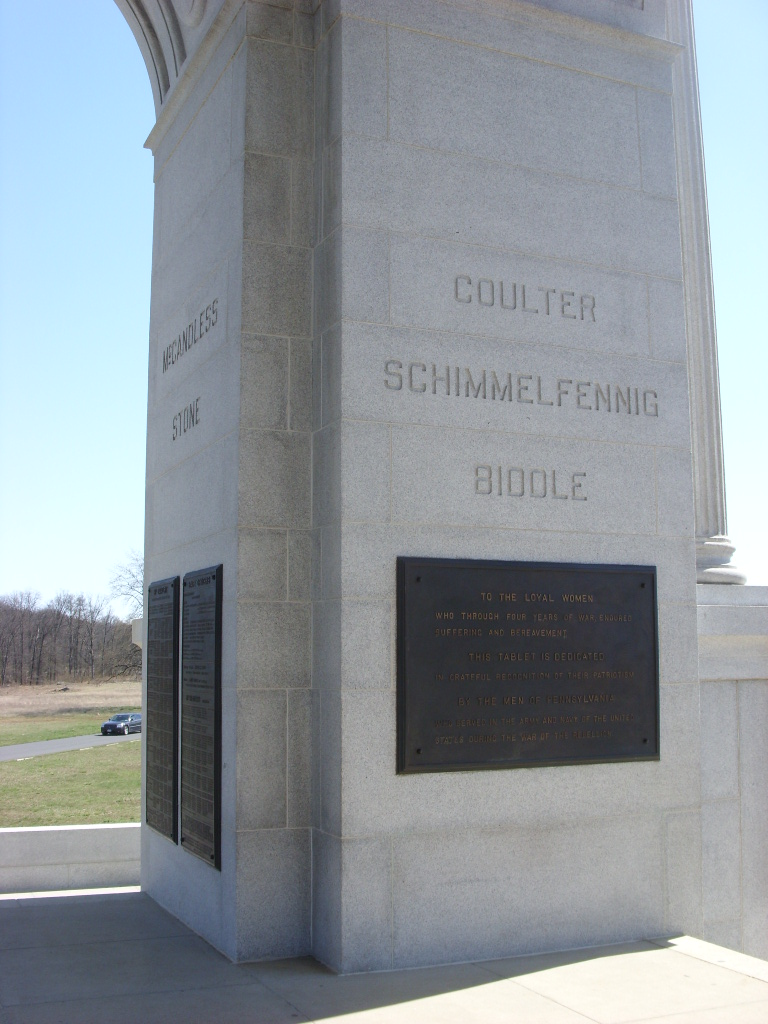
Pavilion's interior.

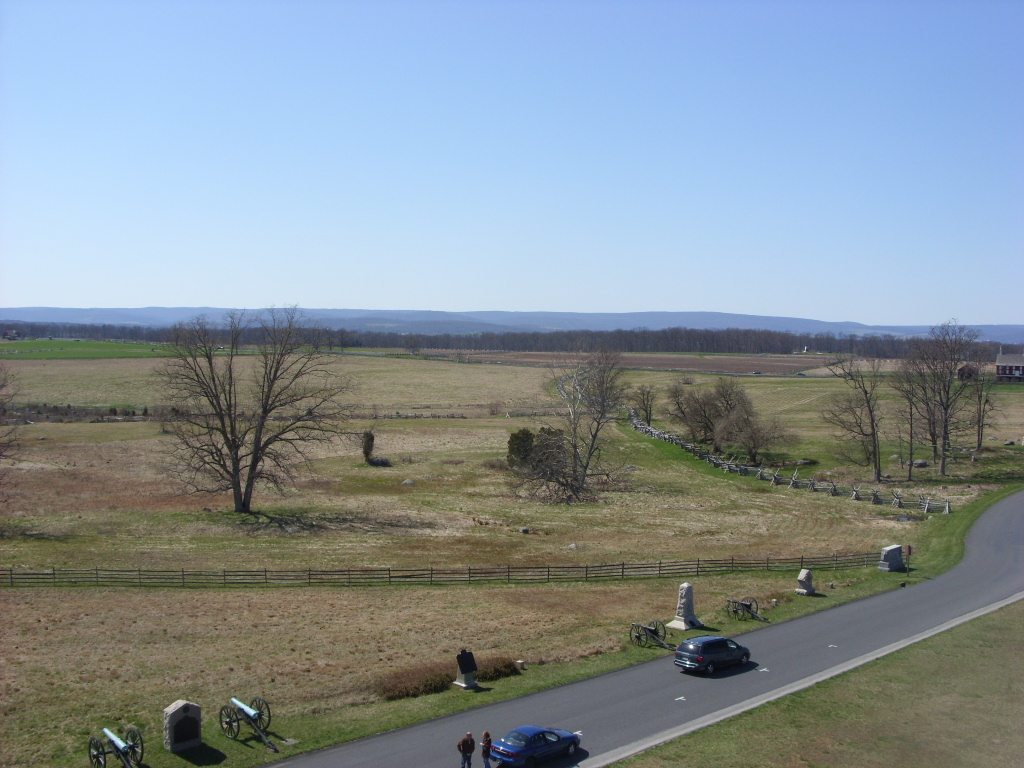
View from observation deck.

== See also ==
- Gettysburg Battlefield Historic District
- List of monuments of the Gettysburg Battlefield

Searchable database of names on the Pennsylvania Monument
